= Immovable Cultural Monuments of National Significance =

Monuments and sites in Georgia

The Immovable Cultural Monuments of National Significance (Georgian: ეროვნული მნიშვნელობის კატეგორიის კულტურის უძრავი ძეგლები) are buildings, structures, sites, or places in Georgia that have been determined to have nationwide cultural significance by meeting special criteria developed by the Ministry of Culture and are subject to preservation by the state.

The monument must have an outstanding artistic or aesthetic value, be associated with a particularly important historical event, person, or overall national values.

The original list of the Immovable Monuments of Cultural Heritage was approved in the Presidential decree No. 665 of 7 November 2006. Since then, it has been updated several times. After the amendments of 2013, the monument can be defined as having national significance by the resolution of the Government of Georgia based on the submission of the Ministry of Culture.

== List of Immovable Cultural Monuments of National Significance ==
Name	Constructed	Location	Year designated	Description	Photo
Gagra basilica church	6th-7th century	Gagra, Abkhazia; 43.325313°N 40.223526°E	2007		
The Dadiani Palaces and Gardens complex	19th century	Zugdidi, Zugdidi Municipality, Samegrelo-Zemo Svaneti; 42.512131°N 41.874069°E	2007		
Batonis castle: fortification wall	17th-18th century	Telavi, Telavi Municipality, Kakheti; 41.917527°N 45.476375°E	2007		
Batonis castle: Palace	17th-18th century	Telavi, Telavi Municipality, Kakheti; 41.917527°N 45.476375°E	2007		
Batonis castle: Royal chapel	17th-18th century	Telavi, Telavi Municipality, Kakheti; 41.917527°N 45.476375°E	2007		
Gonio-Apsaros architectural and archaeological complex	Late Antiquity	Gonio, Batumi, Adjara; 41.573056°N 41.573611°E	2007		
Old Omalo	Late Medieval	Omalo, Akhmeta Municipality, Kakheti; 42.378889°N 45.63°E	2007		
Old Shatili	Late Medieval	Shatili, Dusheti Municipality, Mtskheta-Mtianeti; 42.658889°N 45.157778°E	2007		
Alexander Chavchavadze mansion and park	1818–1831, 1886	Tsinandali, Telavi Municipality, Kakheti; 41.896366°N 45.567084°E	2007		
Melnisi fortress	High Medieval	Abastumani, Adigeni Municipality, Samtskhe–Javakheti; 41.713853°N 42.838724°E	2007		
Otskhe bridge	12th-13th century	Abastumani, Adigeni Municipality, Samtskhe–Javakheti; 41.727222°N 42.840278°E	2007		
Shorshkhoti: a church	Early Medieval	Gorguli, Adigeni Municipality, Samtskhe–Javakheti; 41.669722°N 42.703611°E	2007		
Shorshkhoti: a church	High Medieval	Gorguli, Adigeni Municipality, Samtskhe–Javakheti; 41.669722°N 42.703611°E	2007		
Zarzma monastery: the domed church	14th century	Zarzma, Adigeni Municipality, Samtskhe–Javakheti; 41.679750°N 42.653830°E	2007		
Zarzma monastery: the eukterion	10th century	Zarzma, Adigeni Municipality, Samtskhe–Javakheti; 41.679640°N 42.653762°E	2007		
Zarzma monastery: the eukterion	Medieval	Zarzma, Adigeni Municipality, Samtskhe–Javakheti; 41.679640°N 42.653762°E	2007		
Zarzma monastery: the eukterion	Medieval	Zarzma, Adigeni Municipality, Samtskhe–Javakheti; 41.679640°N 42.653762°E	2007		
Zarzma monastery: the bell-tower	14th century	Zarzma, Adigeni Municipality, Samtskhe–Javakheti; 41.679579°N 42.654021°E	2007		
Zarzma monastery: the wellhead	13th-14th century	Zarzma, Adigeni Municipality, Samtskhe–Javakheti; 41.679587°N 42.653758°E	2007		
Zanavi fortress	High Medieval	Didi Zanavi, Adigeni Municipality, Samtskhe–Javakheti; 41.700077°N 42.715289°E	2007		
Zanavi, the ruined church	High Medieval	Didi Zanavi, Adigeni Municipality, Samtskhe–Javakheti; 41.699252°N 42.715616°E	2007		
Chule Monastery: the church of St. George	14th century	Patara Zanavi, Adigeni Municipality, Samtskhe–Javakheti; 41.703496°N 42.702183°E	2007		
Chule Monastery: the chapel	14th-15th century	Patara Zanavi, Adigeni Municipality, Samtskhe–Javakheti; 41.703496°N 42.702183°E	2007		
Chule Monastery: the bell-tower	14th century	Patara Zanavi, Adigeni Municipality, Samtskhe–Javakheti; 41.703496°N 42.702183°E	2007		
Chule Monastery: accessory structures	Late Medieval	Patara Zanavi, Adigeni Municipality, Samtskhe–Javakheti; 41.703496°N 42.702183°E	2007		
Kikibo fortress	Medieval	Kikibo, Adigeni Municipality, Samtskhe–Javakheti; 41.760000°N 42.543737°E	2007		
Okros Tsikhe	High Medieval	Shoqa, Adigeni Municipality, Samtskhe–Javakheti; 41.708438°N 42.762623°E	2007		
Aspindza fortress	High Medieval	Aspindza, Aspindza Municipality, Samtskhe–Javakheti; 41.579081°N 43.253114°E	2007		
Chikhorisi church: the main church	10th century	Aspindza, Aspindza Municipality, Samtskhe–Javakheti; 41.558497°N 43.277586°E	2007		
Chikhorisi church: other structures	Late Medieval	Aspindza, Aspindza Municipality, Samtskhe–Javakheti; 41.559178°N 43.277584°E	2007		
Damala church	Early Medieval	Damala, Aspindza Municipality, Samtskhe–Javakheti; 41.571667°N 43.301944°E	2007		
Giorgitsminda church	Early Medieval	Tmogvi, Aspindza Municipality, Samtskhe–Javakheti; 41.403487°N 43.287908°E	2007		
Zeda Vardzia church of the Theotokos	10th-11th century	Vardzia, Aspindza Municipality, Samtskhe–Javakheti; 41.383986°N 43.257528°E	2007		
Karzameti church	14th century	Aspindza Municipality, Samtskhe–Javakheti; 41.339722°N 43.118889°E	2007		
Gaveti Church of St. George	13th century	Aspindza Municipality, Samtskhe–Javakheti; 41.361595°N 43.143191°E	2007		
Zeda Tmogvi church	11th century	Aspindza Municipality, Samtskhe–Javakheti; 41.403470°N 43.287902°E	2007		
Vardzia cave monastery complex	12th century	Aspindza Municipality, Samtskhe–Javakheti; 41.381076°N 43.284229°E	2007		
Vanis Kvabebi cave monastery	12th-13th century	Aspindza Municipality, Samtskhe–Javakheti; 41.382461°N 43.308081°E	2007		
Tmogvi fortress site: the citadel domed church	13th-14th century	Aspindza Municipality, Samtskhe–Javakheti; 41.395704°N 43.316486°E	2007		
Tmogvi fortress site: other structures of the citadel	9th-16th century	Aspindza Municipality, Samtskhe–Javakheti; 41.395436°N 43.317096°E	2007		
Tmogvi fortress site: the church	9th-16th century	Aspindza Municipality, Samtskhe–Javakheti; 41.395436°N 43.317096°E	2007		
Tmogvi fortress site: other structures	9th-16th century	Aspindza Municipality, Samtskhe–Javakheti; 41.395436°N 43.317096°E	2007		
Toki tower	Late Medieval	Toki, Aspindza Municipality, Samtskhe–Javakheti; 41.48685°N 43.365833°E	2007		
Tsunda Church	12th-13th century	Nakalakevi, Aspindza Municipality, Samtskhe–Javakheti; 41.407697°N 43.334483°E	2007		
Shoreti monastery	Medieval	Ota, Aspindza Municipality, Samtskhe–Javakheti; 41.615411°N 43.334218°E	2007		
Kizilderesi church	9th century	Ota, Aspindza Municipality, Samtskhe–Javakheti; 41.603056°N 43.305030°E	2007		
Gharta church	9th-10th century	Ota, Aspindza Municipality, Samtskhe–Javakheti; 41.642355°N 43.341900°E	2007		
Saro church of the Archangels	7th–8th century, reconstructed 1747	Saro, Aspindza Municipality, Samtskhe–Javakheti; 41.505644°N 43.279475°E	2007		
Saro fortress	12th century	Saro, Aspindza Municipality, Samtskhe–Javakheti; 41.506735°N 43.277507°E	2007		
Alandza church	8th–9th century	Toloshi, Aspindza Municipality, Samtskhe–Javakheti; 41.468404°N 43.261845°E	2007		
Dzveli church	10th century	Dzveli, Aspindza Municipality, Samtskhe–Javakheti; 41.580731°N 43.149839°E	2007		
Khertvisi Fortress	10th–18th century	Khertvisi, Aspindza Municipality, Samtskhe–Javakheti; 41.479428°N 43.285357°E	2007		
Abuli church	10th century	Abuli, Akhalkalaki Municipality, Samtskhe–Javakheti; 41.401944°N 43.610556°E	2007		
Abuli fortress	1st millennium BC	Akhalkalaki Municipality, Samtskhe–Javakheti; 41.372911°N 43.685012°E	2007		
Azavreti church	9th–10th century	Azavreti, Akhalkalaki Municipality, Samtskhe–Javakheti; 41.586111°N 43.452778°E	2007		
Alastani church	10th–11th century	Alastani, Akhalkalaki Municipality, Samtskhe–Javakheti; 41.545359°N 43.399221°E	2007		
Bavra church	High Medieval	Bavra, Akhalkalaki Municipality, Samtskhe–Javakheti; 41.398900°N 43.513467°E	2007		
Baraleti church	High Medieval	Baraleti, Akhalkalaki Municipality, Samtskhe–Javakheti; 41.543993°N 43.508989°E	2007		
Sirgo church	8th century	Baraleti, Akhalkalaki Municipality, Samtskhe–Javakheti; 41.566067°N 43.514217°E	2007		
Leknari church	10th century	Bezhano, Akhalkalaki Municipality, Samtskhe–Javakheti; 41.609722°N 43.562222°E	2007		
Ruined church	12th century	Bezhano, Akhalkalaki Municipality, Samtskhe–Javakheti; 41.610495°N 43.567036°E	2007		
Buzaveti church	10th century	Buzaveti, Akhalkalaki Municipality, Samtskhe–Javakheti; 41.422500°N 43.572222°E	2007		
Burnasheti church	10th century	Burnasheti, Akhalkalaki Municipality, Samtskhe–Javakheti; 41.585833°N 43.462222°E	2007		
Didi Samsari church, a cave	10th century	Buzaveti, Akhalkalaki Municipality, Samtskhe–Javakheti; 41.538327°N 43.598583°E	2007		
Didi Samsari church, a domed church	10th century	Didi Samsari, Akhalkalaki Municipality, Samtskhe–Javakheti; 41.538327°N 43.598583°E	2007		
Didi Samsari church, other structures	10th century	Didi Samsari, Akhalkalaki Municipality, Samtskhe–Javakheti; 41.538327°N 43.598583°E	2007		
Kochio church	10th century	Kochio, Akhalkalaki Municipality, Samtskhe–Javakheti; 41.580122°N 43.522989°E	2007		
Kumurdo Cathedral	964	Kumurdo, Akhalkalaki Municipality, Samtskhe–Javakheti; 41.397639°N 43.354856°E	2007		
Naisasi church	10th-11th century	Chunchkha, Akhalkalaki Municipality, Samtskhe–Javakheti; 41.482567°N 43.364217°E	2007		
Khorenia cemetery church	11th century	Khorenia, Akhalkalaki Municipality, Samtskhe–Javakheti; 41.341850°N 43.522917°E	2007		
Karneti church	11th century	Khorenia, Akhalkalaki Municipality, Samtskhe–Javakheti; 41.336667°N 43.506150°E	2007		
Khospio church	10th century	Khospio, Akhalkalaki Municipality, Samtskhe–Javakheti; 41.370250°N 43.498067°E	2007		
Sapara Monastery: the church of St. Sabbas	13th-14th century	Akhaltsikhe Municipality, Samtskhe–Javakheti; 41.602289°N 43.030947°E	2007		
Sapara Monastery: the church of the Dormition	10th century	Akhaltsikhe Municipality, Samtskhe–Javakheti; 41.602289°N 43.030947°E	2007		
Sapara Monastery: the church of St. Demetrius	Late Medieval	Akhaltsikhe Municipality, Samtskhe–Javakheti; 41.602289°N 43.030947°E	2007		
Sapara Monastery: the church of Sts. Peter and Paul	Late Medieval	Akhaltsikhe Municipality, Samtskhe–Javakheti; 41.602289°N 43.030947°E	2007		
Sapara Monastery: the church of St. George	Late Medieval	Akhaltsikhe Municipality, Samtskhe–Javakheti; 41.602289°N 43.030947°E	2007		
Sapara Monastery: the bell-tower	14th century	Akhaltsikhe Municipality, Samtskhe–Javakheti; 41.602289°N 43.030947°E	2007		
Sapara Monastery: the chapel of St. George	Late Medieval	Akhaltsikhe Municipality, Samtskhe–Javakheti; 41.602289°N 43.030947°E	2007		
Sapara Monastery: the church of St. John Chrysostom	Late Medieval	Akhaltsikhe Municipality, Samtskhe–Javakheti; 41.602289°N 43.030947°E	2007		
Sapara Monastery: the church of the Baptist	Late Medieval	Akhaltsikhe Municipality, Samtskhe–Javakheti; 41.602289°N 43.030947°E	2007		
Sapara Monastery: the Atabeg palace	Late Medieval	Akhaltsikhe Municipality, Samtskhe–Javakheti; 41.602512°N 43.0300217°E	2007		
Sapara Monastery: the fortification wall	Late Medieval	Akhaltsikhe Municipality, Samtskhe–Javakheti; 41.602512°N 43.0300217°E	2007		
Sapara Monastery: other structures	Late Medieval	Akhaltsikhe Municipality, Samtskhe–Javakheti; 41.602512°N 43.0300217°E	2007		
Rabati Castle: Sargis Jaqeli castle	14th century	Akhaltsikhe, Akhaltsikhe Municipality, Samtskhe–Javakheti; 41.642539°N 42.975625°E	2007		
Rabati Castle: the citadel church	High Medieval	Akhaltsikhe, Akhaltsikhe Municipality, Samtskhe–Javakheti; 41.642539°N 42.975625°E	2007		
Rabati Castle: the gate and walls	Late Medieval	Akhaltsikhe, Akhaltsikhe Municipality, Samtskhe–Javakheti; 41.642539°N 42.975625°E	2007		
Rabati Castle: the Ahmediyye Mosque	17th century	Akhaltsikhe, Akhaltsikhe Municipality, Samtskhe–Javakheti; 41.642823°N 42.975843°E	2007		
Rabati Castle: the Madrasa	Late Medieval	Akhaltsikhe, Akhaltsikhe Municipality, Samtskhe–Javakheti; 41.642823°N 42.975843°E	2007		
Rabati Castle: the Minaret	Late Medieval	Akhaltsikhe, Akhaltsikhe Municipality, Samtskhe–Javakheti; 41.642823°N 42.975843°E	2007		
Rabati Castle: the ruined tower	Late Medieval	Akhaltsikhe, Akhaltsikhe Municipality, Samtskhe–Javakheti; 41.642823°N 42.975843°E	2007		
Atsquri church	Medieval	Atsquri, Akhaltsikhe Municipality, Samtskhe–Javakheti; 41.724264°N 43.1668°E	2007		
Bieti church	14th century	Akhaltsikhe Municipality, Samtskhe–Javakheti; 41.743056°N 43.105833°E	2007		
Atsquri fortress	10th–14th century	Atsquri, Akhaltsikhe Municipality, Samtskhe–Javakheti; 41.728304°N 43.165717°E	2007		
Slesa fortress	High Medieval	Atsquri, Akhaltsikhe Municipality, Samtskhe–Javakheti; 41.747500°N 43.206502°E	2007		
Church of Theotokos of Vale	10th century	Vale, Akhaltsikhe Municipality, Samtskhe–Javakheti; 41.616704°N 42.866626°E	2007		
Tiseli monastery, the hall church	14th-15th century	Tiseli, Akhaltsikhe Municipality, Samtskhe–Javakheti; 41.710455°N 43.234597°E	2007		
Tiseli monastery, the wall	14th-15th century	Tiseli, Akhaltsikhe Municipality, Samtskhe–Javakheti; 41.710455°N 43.234597°E	2007		
Tiseli monastery, other structures	14th-15th century	Tiseli, Akhaltsikhe Municipality, Samtskhe–Javakheti; 41.710455°N 43.234597°E	2007		
Agara monastery, the main church	10th-11th century	Uraveli, Akhaltsikhe Municipality, Samtskhe–Javakheti; 41.522471°N 43.038157°E	2007		
Agara monastery, a church	High Medieval	Uraveli, Akhaltsikhe Municipality, Samtskhe–Javakheti; 41.522471°N 43.038157°E	2007		
Agara monastery, a church	High Medieval	Uraveli, Akhaltsikhe Municipality, Samtskhe–Javakheti; 41.522471°N 43.038157°E	2007		
Agara monastery, a church	High Medieval	Uraveli, Akhaltsikhe Municipality, Samtskhe–Javakheti; 41.522471°N 43.038157°E	2007		
Agara monastery, a church	High Medieval	Uraveli, Akhaltsikhe Municipality, Samtskhe–Javakheti; 41.522471°N 43.038157°E	2007		
Agara monastery, the bell-tower	13th–14th century	Uraveli, Akhaltsikhe Municipality, Samtskhe–Javakheti; 41.522471°N 43.038157°E	2007		
Agara monastery, the refectory	11th–12th century	Uraveli, Akhaltsikhe Municipality, Samtskhe–Javakheti; 41.522471°N 43.038157°E	2007		
Agara monastery, other structures	High and Late Medieval	Uraveli, Akhaltsikhe Municipality, Samtskhe–Javakheti; 41.522471°N 43.038157°E	2007		
Jakismani Monastery, a church	Early and High Medieval	Akhaltsikhe Municipality, Samtskhe–Javakheti; 41.518162°N 42.820829°E	2007		
Jakismani Monastery, a church	Early and High Medieval	Akhaltsikhe Municipality, Samtskhe–Javakheti; 41.518162°N 42.820829°E	2007		
Jakismani Monastery, the bell-tower	Early and High Medieval	Akhaltsikhe Municipality, Samtskhe–Javakheti; 41.518162°N 42.820829°E	2007		
Jakismani Monastery, other structures	Early and High Medieval	Akhaltsikhe Municipality, Samtskhe–Javakheti; 41.518162°N 42.820829°E	2007		
Potoleti church	High Medieval	Akhaldaba, Borjomi Municipality, Samtskhe–Javakheti; 41.905530°N 43.481596°E	2007		
Nedzvi three-nave basilica	9th century	Borjomi Municipality, Samtskhe–Javakheti; 41.869845°N 43.542924°E	2007		
Tori church	Early Medieval	Tori, Borjomi Municipality, Samtskhe–Javakheti; 41.763280°N 43.419821°E	2007		
Tori palace	Early Medieval	Tori, Borjomi Municipality, Samtskhe–Javakheti; 41.764083°N 43.413250°E	2007		
Church of St. George of the North	1333	Tori, Borjomi Municipality, Samtskhe–Javakheti; 41.806785°N 43.446568°E	2007		
Likani Park	1890s	Borjomi, Borjomi Municipality, Samtskhe–Javakheti; 41.828048°N 43.364407°E	2007		
Likani monastery	8th–9th century	Borjomi, Borjomi Municipality, Samtskhe–Javakheti; 41.839245°N 43.336594°E	2007		
Koshkighele church of the Theotokos and bell-tower	8th–9th century	Borjomi, Borjomi Municipality, Samtskhe–Javakheti; 41.838940°N 43.338118°E	2007		
Mtsvane Monastery, the church	Medieval	Borjomi Municipality, Samtskhe–Javakheti; 41.810656°N 43.309811°E	2007		
Mtsvane Monastery, the bell-tower	Late Medieval	Borjomi Municipality, Samtskhe–Javakheti; 41.810417°N 43.309858°E	2007		
Tabatskuri Red Church	Medieval	Tabatskuri, Borjomi Municipality, Samtskhe–Javakheti; 41.662705°N 43.624698°E	2007		
Tadzrisi church complex	High Medieval	Tadzrisi, Borjomi Municipality, Samtskhe–Javakheti; 41.735796°N 43.281414°E	2007		
Timotesubani monastery, the domed church	1204	Timotesubani, Borjomi Municipality, Samtskhe–Javakheti; 41.810824°N 43.518202°E	2007		
Timotesubani monastery, the single-nave church	10th–11th century	Timotesubani, Borjomi Municipality, Samtskhe–Javakheti; 41.810824°N 43.518202°E	2007		
Timotesubani monastery, the refectory	12th–13th century	Timotesubani, Borjomi Municipality, Samtskhe–Javakheti; 41.810824°N 43.518202°E	2007		
Timotesubani monastery, the wall	12th–13th century	Timotesubani, Borjomi Municipality, Samtskhe–Javakheti; 41.810824°N 43.518202°E	2007		
Timotesubani monastery, the gate	12th–13th century	Timotesubani, Borjomi Municipality, Samtskhe–Javakheti; 41.810824°N 43.518202°E	2007		
Timotesubani monastery, other structures	Medieval	Timotesubani, Borjomi Municipality, Samtskhe–Javakheti; 41.810824°N 43.518202°E	2007		
Kvabiskhevi church	9th century	Kvabiskhevi, Borjomi Municipality, Samtskhe–Javakheti; 41.786839°N 43.239133°E	2007		
Gogichaant Ghele complex of stone halls and a church	Early medieval	Borjomi Municipality, Samtskhe–Javakheti; 41.794722°N 43.310000°E	2007		
Shaori fortress	1st century BC	Akhalkalaki Municipality, Samtskhe–Javakheti; 41.485021°N 43.745691°E	2007		
Gandzani church of John the Baptist	Medieval	Gandzani, Akhalkalaki Municipality, Samtskhe–Javakheti; 41.351128°N 43.749917°E	2007		
A church at Gandzani	10th–11th century	Gandzani, Akhalkalaki Municipality, Samtskhe–Javakheti; 41.351128°N 43.749917°E	2007		
A church at Gandzani	Medieval	Gandzani, Akhalkalaki Municipality, Samtskhe–Javakheti; 41.351128°N 43.749917°E	2007		
Gandzani church	12th–14th century	Gandzani, Akhalkalaki Municipality, Samtskhe–Javakheti; 41.351128°N 43.749917°E	2007		
Gandzani church with eukterion	12th–14th century	Gandzani, Akhalkalaki Municipality, Samtskhe–Javakheti; 41.351128°N 43.749917°E	2007		
Gandzani fort	High Medieval	Gandzani, Akhalkalaki Municipality, Samtskhe–Javakheti; 41.351128°N 43.749917°E	2007		
Gandzani church	10th–11th century	Gandzani, Akhalkalaki Municipality, Samtskhe–Javakheti; 41.351128°N 43.749917°E	2007		
Kat Kar Menhir	1st century BC	Gandzani, Akhalkalaki Municipality, Samtskhe–Javakheti; 41.351128°N 43.749917°E	2007		
Parvana church	10th–11th century	Rodionovka, Ninotsminda Municipality, Samtskhe–Javakheti; 41.452133°N 43.849200°E	2007		
Sagamo church	10th century	Sagamo, Ninotsminda Municipality, Samtskhe–Javakheti; 41.311116°N 43.760559°E	2007		
Sagamo church	10th–11th century	Sagamo, Ninotsminda Municipality, Samtskhe–Javakheti; 41.311083°N 43.760733°E	2007		
Saint Nino's monastery of Poka	1027	Poka, Ninotsminda Municipality, Samtskhe–Javakheti; 41.405409°N 43.801581°E	2007		
Tontio bridge	13th–14th century	Qaurma, Ninotsminda Municipality, Samtskhe–Javakheti; 41.322499°N 43.584077°E	2007		
Saint George's church of Tontio	11th century	Qaurma, Ninotsminda Municipality, Samtskhe–Javakheti; 41.323677°N 43.584641°E	2007		
Bagrati Cathedral, the domed church	1003	Kutaisi, Imereti; 42.277211°N 42.704243°E	2007		
Bagrati Cathedral, the bell-tower	Late Medieval	Kutaisi, Imereti; 42.277000°N 42.704028°E	2007		
Bagrati Cathedral: the Ukimerioni fortress	Medieval	Kutaisi, Imereti; 42.277348°N 42.705091°E	2007		
Bagrati Cathedral: the Ukimerioni church	Medieval	Kutaisi, Imereti; 42.277290°N 42.705404°E	2007		
Bagrati Cathedral: other structures	Medieval	Kutaisi, Imereti; 42.277290°N 42.705404°E	2007		
Mtsvanekvavila complex: the church of the Archangels	11th century	Kutaisi, Imereti; 42.276224°N 42.716584°E	2007		
Mtsvanekvavila complex: the tower	17th century	Kutaisi, Imereti; 42.276224°N 42.716584°E	2007		
Mtsvanekvavila complex: the Kvariani church	17th century	Kutaisi, Imereti; 42.276224°N 42.716584°E	2007		
Okros Chardakhi mansion	Late Medieval	Kutaisi, Imereti; 42.269925°N 42.700575°E	2007		
Jachvis Khidi bridge	19th century	Kutaisi, Imereti; 42.273944°N 42.702256°E	2007		
Palace of Geguti: the palace church	Medieval	Geguti, Tsqaltubo Municipality, Imereti; 42.190350°N 42.691207°E	2007		
Palace of Geguti: other structures	Medieval	Geguti, Tsqaltubo Municipality, Imereti; 42.190350°N 42.691207°E	2007		
John the Baptist's church of Derchi	High Medieval	Derchi, Tsqaltubo Municipality, Imereti; 42.462856°N 42.776411°E	2007		
Saint Cyril's church of Zarati	High Medieval	Zarati, Tsqaltubo Municipality, Imereti; 42.354191°N 42.722696°E	2007		
Tabakini monastery: Saint George's church	10th–11th century	Tabakini, Zestaponi Municipality, Imereti; 42.046549°N 43.022156°E	2007		
Tabakini monastery: the bell-tower	16th century	Tabakini, Zestaponi Municipality, Imereti; 42.046549°N 43.022156°E	2007		
Tabakini monastery: other structures	Medieval	Tabakini, Zestaponi Municipality, Imereti; 42.046549°N 43.022156°E	2007		
Saint George's church of Zeda Simoneti	11th century	Zeda Simoneti, Terjola Municipality, Imereti; 42.230556°N 42.896667°E	2007		
Nagarevi bridge	1667	Nagarevi, Terjola Municipality, Imereti; 42.262489°N 42.809074°E	2007		
Skanda fortress	6th–18th century	Skande, Terjola Municipality, Imereti; 42.269341°N 43.053709°E	2007		
Vartsikhe fortress	4th–6th century, 9th–11th century	Vartsikhe, Baghdati Municipality, Imereti; 42.132078°N 42.724348°E	2007		
Devadzeebi church	Medieval	Tsitelkhevi, Baghdati Municipality, Imereti; 42.084894°N 42.764522°E	2007		
Ubisi monastery: the church of St. George	Medieval	Ubisi, Kharagauli Municipality, Imereti; 42.099605°N 43.228153°E	2007		
Ubisi monastery: the bell-tower	Medieval	Ubisi, Kharagauli Municipality, Imereti; 42.099605°N 43.228153°E	2007		
Ubisi monastery: the tower	Medieval	Ubisi, Kharagauli Municipality, Imereti; 42.099605°N 43.228153°E	2007		
Ubisi monastery: the refectory	Medieval	Ubisi, Kharagauli Municipality, Imereti; 42.099605°N 43.228153°E	2007		
Ubisi monastery: the fortification wall	Medieval	Ubisi, Kharagauli Municipality, Imereti; 42.099605°N 43.228153°E	2007		
Ubisi monastery: other structures	Medieval	Ubisi, Kharagauli Municipality, Imereti; 42.099605°N 43.228153°E	2007		
Ekhvevi church of the Theotokos	10th–11th century	Sachkhere Municipality, Imereti; 42.305556°N 43.508889°E	2007		
Bajiti church of the Trinity	10th–11th century	Bajiti, Sachkhere Municipality, Imereti; 42.347222°N 43.368056°E	2007		
Savane Church of Saint George	1046	Savane, Sachkhere Municipality, Imereti; 42.322778°N 43.470556°E	2007		
Speti church of the Savior	11th century	Speti, Sachkhere Municipality, Imereti; 42.322778°N 43.470556°E	2007		
The House of Akaki Tsereteli	19th century	Skhvitori, Sachkhere Municipality, Imereti; 42.355044°N 43.422238°E	2007		
Koreti church of the Savior	1001	Koreti, Sachkhere Municipality, Imereti; 42.304722°N 43.387500°E	2007		
Chikha fortress	Medieval	Chikha, Sachkhere Municipality, Imereti; 42.349810°N 43.468902°E	2007		
Chikha church	11th–12th century	Chikha, Sachkhere Municipality, Imereti; 42.349810°N 43.468902°E	2007		
Jruchi monastery: the domed church	High medieval	Tskhomareti, Sachkhere Municipality, Imereti; 42.398817°N 43.362851°E	2007		
Jruchi monastery: other structures	High medieval	Tskhomareti, Sachkhere Municipality, Imereti; 42.398817°N 43.362851°E	2007		
Gelati monastery: the Cathedral of the Nativity of the Theotokos	12th century	Gelati, Tkibuli Municipality, Imereti; 42.294618°N 42.768122°E	2007		
Gelati monastery: the church of Saint George	12th–13th century	Gelati, Tkibuli Municipality, Imereti; 42.294564°N 42.768684°E	2007		
Gelati monastery: the church of Saint Nicholas	12th–13th century	Gelati, Tkibuli Municipality, Imereti; 42.294678°N 42.767737°E	2007		
Gelati monastery: the bell-tower	12th century	Gelati, Tkibuli Municipality, Imereti; 42.294564°N 42.768684°E	2007		
Gelati monastery: the Gelati Academy	12th–13th century	Gelati, Tkibuli Municipality, Imereti; 42.294675°N 42.767521°E	2007		
Gelati monastery: the tomb of King David the Builder	12th–16th century	Gelati, Tkibuli Municipality, Imereti; 42.294113°N 2.768028°E	2007		
Gelati monastery: the fortification wall	12th–13th century	Gelati, Tkibuli Municipality, Imereti; 42.294113°N 2.768028°E	2007		
Gelati monastery: other structures	Medieval	Gelati, Tkibuli Municipality, Imereti; 42.294113°N 2.768028°E	2007		
Kisoreti church of Saint George	Medieval	Kisoreti, Tkibuli Municipality, Imereti; 42.427581°N 42.873180°E	2007		
Motsameta monastery: the church	Medieval	Motsameta, Tkibuli Municipality, Imereti; 42.282216°N 42.759111°E	2007		
Motsameta monastery: the bell-tower	Medieval	Motsameta, Tkibuli Municipality, Imereti; 42.282216°N 42.759111°E	2007		
Motsameta monastery: the cave	Medieval	Motsameta, Tkibuli Municipality, Imereti; 42.282216°N 42.759111°E	2007		
Motsameta monastery: the wall	Medieval	Motsameta, Tkibuli Municipality, Imereti; 42.282216°N 42.759111°E	2007		
Motsameta monastery: other structures	Medieval	Motsameta, Tkibuli Municipality, Imereti; 42.282216°N 42.759111°E	2007		
Mghvimevi monastery: the church of the Lord	13th century	Chiatura Municipality, Imereti; 42.297364°N 43.300727°E	2007		
Mghvimevi monastery: the "small church"	14th century	Chiatura Municipality, Imereti; 42.297364°N 43.300727°E	2007		
Mghvimevi monastery: the bell-tower	14th–19th century	Chiatura Municipality, Imereti; 42.297364°N 43.300727°E	2007		
Mghvimevi monastery: the wall	Late Medieval	Chiatura Municipality, Imereti; 42.297364°N 43.300727°E	2007		
Mghvimevi monastery: other structures	Late Medieval	Chiatura Municipality, Imereti; 42.297364°N 43.300727°E	2007		
Darkveti church of Saint George	11th century	Darkveti, Chiatura Municipality, Imereti; 42.325127°N 43.335300°E	2007		
Katskhi Pillar: a cave church	5th–6th century	Katskhi, Chiatura Municipality, Imereti; 42.287532°N 43.215841°E	2007		
Katskhi Pillar: a church	5th–6th century	Katskhi, Chiatura Municipality, Imereti; 42.287532°N 43.215841°E	2007		
Katskhi Pillar: a shelter	Medieval	Katskhi, Chiatura Municipality, Imereti; 42.287532°N 43.215841°E	2007		
Rgani church of Saint George	10th century	Rgani, Chiatura Municipality, Imereti; 42.317500°N 43.234722°E	2007		
Kvetera complex: domed church	10th century	Akhmeta Municipality, Kakheti; 42.056453°N 45.099671°E	2007		
Kvetera complex: hall church	10th century	Akhmeta Municipality, Kakheti; 42.056453°N 45.099671°E	2007		
Kvetera complex: palace ruins	Early medieval	Akhmeta Municipality, Kakheti; 42.056453°N 45.099671°E	2007		
Kvetera complex: citadel	10th–11th century	Akhmeta Municipality, Kakheti; 42.056453°N 45.099671°E	2007		
Kvetera complex: lower fortress	Late medieval	Akhmeta Municipality, Kakheti; 42.056453°N 45.099671°E	2007		
Kvetera complex: other structures	Late medieval	Akhmeta Municipality, Kakheti; 42.056453°N 45.099671°E	2007		
Akhmeta church of the Deity	550–600	Akhmeta, Akhmeta Municipality, Kakheti; 42.039444°N 45.219722°E	2007		
Alaverdi complex: the church of Saint George	11th century	Alaverdi, Akhmeta Municipality, Kakheti; 42.032484°N 45.377128°E	2007		
Alaverdi complex: the bell-tower	17th century	Alaverdi, Akhmeta Municipality, Kakheti; 42.032484°N 45.377128°E	2007		
Alaverdi complex: the chamber	17th century	Alaverdi, Akhmeta Municipality, Kakheti; 42.032484°N 45.377128°E	2007		
Alaverdi complex: the fortified wall	17th century	Alaverdi, Akhmeta Municipality, Kakheti; 42.032484°N 45.377128°E	2007		
Alaverdi complex: the palace	17th century	Alaverdi, Akhmeta Municipality, Kakheti; 42.032484°N 45.377128°E	2007		
Girevi tower	Late Medieval	Girevi, Akhmeta Municipality, Kakheti; 42.498640°N 45.481464°E	2007		
Dartlo complex	Late Medieval	Dartlo, Akhmeta Municipality, Kakheti; 42.438719°N 45.582637°E	2007		
Diklo castle	Late Medieval	Diklo, Akhmeta Municipality, Kakheti; 42.396605°N 45.688600°E	2007		
Zemo Alvani church of John the Baptist	8th–9th century	Zemo Alvani, Akhmeta Municipality, Kakheti; 42.052594°N 45.331416°E	2007		
Zemo Khodasheni nunnery complex	13th century	Zemo Khodasheni, Akhmeta Municipality, Kakheti; 41.952431°N 45.343459°E	2007		
Indurta towers	Late medieval	Akhmeta Municipality, Kakheti; 42.447305°N 45.435936°E	2007		
Kvavlo towers	Late medieval	Akhmeta Municipality, Kakheti; 42.444297°N 45.587717°E	2007		
Koghoto Usaneti church	18th century	Koghoto, Akhmeta Municipality, Kakheti; 41.993944°N 45.394930°E	2007		
Matani Tskhrakara monastery	8th–9th century	Matani, Akhmeta Municipality, Kakheti; 42.068945°N 45.171586°E	2007		
Erelaant church	5th–6th century	Matani, Akhmeta Municipality, Kakheti; 42.049659°N 45.163742°E	2007		
Matani church	Late 9th century	Matani, Akhmeta Municipality, Kakheti; 42.126273°N 45.199149°E	2007		
Parsma fortified dwellings	Late medieval	Akhmeta Municipality, Kakheti; 42.486667°N 45.502500°E	2018		
Kharchashani church of the Deity	1731	Akhmeta Municipality, Kakheti; 42.079973°N 45.316241°E	2007		
Kurtanidzeuli church of St. Marina	12th–13th century	Khevischala, Akhmeta Municipality, Kakheti; 42.137652°N 45.207942°E	2007		
Hegho towers	Late medieval	Akhmeta Municipality, Kakheti; 42.500385°N 45.466700°E	2007		
John the Baptist shrine (khati) in Hegho	Late medieval	Akhmeta Municipality, Kakheti; 42.500385°N 45.466700°E	2007		
Gurjaani Kvelatsminda Church	8th century	Gurjaani, Gurjaani Municipality, Kakheti; 41.720457°N 45.788138°E	2007		
Vazisubani church of the Domition	6th century	Vazisubani, Gurjaani Municipality, Kakheti; 41.821652°N 45.700112°E	2007		
Davitiani church	6th–7th century	Vazisubani, Gurjaani Municipality, Kakheti; 41.812495°N 45.683975°E	2007		
Sanagire monastery of Saint George	10th–11th century	Vazisubani, Gurjaani Municipality, Kakheti; 41.799953°N 45.654752°E	2007		
Vachnadziani palace	10th century	Vachnadziani, Gurjaani Municipality, Kakheti; 41.810000°N 45.608889°E	2007		
Vachnadziani Kvelatsminda church: the domed church	9th century	Vachnadziani, Gurjaani Municipality, Kakheti; 41.810000°N 45.608889°E	2007		
Vachnadziani Kvelatsminda church: the basilica	6th–7th century	Vachnadziani, Gurjaani Municipality, Kakheti; 41.810000°N 45.608889°E	2007		
Zegaani monastery: the basilica	7th century	Zegaani, Gurjaani Municipality, Kakheti; 41.792312°N 45.708022°E	2007		
Zegaani monastery: the church of St. Marina	5th century	Zegaani, Gurjaani Municipality, Kakheti; 41.792312°N 45.708022°E	2007		
Kardanakhi Sabatsminda church	13th–16th century	Kardanakhi, Gurjaani Municipality, Kakheti; 41.668333°N 45.873056°E	2007		
Kardanakhi basilica	6th century	Kardanakhi, Gurjaani Municipality, Kakheti; 41.669483°N 45.873241°E	2007		
Cheremi, the ruined town: three-nave basilica, the Tsverodabali church, small domed church, palace ruins, and other structures	5th–11th century	Cheremi, Gurjaani Municipality, Kakheti; 41.767333°N 45.559762°E	2007		
Akhali Shuamta	16th century	Telavi Municipality, Kakheti; 41.913517°N 45.390949°E	2007		
Dzveli Shuamta monastery	5th–7th century	Telavi Municipality, Kakheti; 41.910809°N 45.405910°E	2007		
Ikalto Monastery complex: the church of the Transfiguration	6th–12th century	Telavi Municipality, Kakheti; 41.937323°N 45.381073°E	2007		
Ikalto Monastery complex: the academy	6th–12th century	Telavi Municipality, Kakheti; 41.937323°N 45.381073°E	2007		
Ikalto Monastery complex: the Trinity church	6th–12th century	Telavi Municipality, Kakheti; 41.937323°N 45.381073°E	2007		
Akura church of Saint David	9th century	Akura, Telavi Municipality, Kakheti; 41.850746°N 45.592175°E	2007		
Vanta palace ruins	9th century	Vanta, Telavi Municipality, Kakheti; 41.859578°N 45.604363°E	2007		
Ikalto three-nave basilica	Early medieval	Ikalto, Telavi Municipality, Kakheti; 41.948189°N 45.388647°E	2007		
Church of Saint Shio	12th–13th century	Ikalto, Telavi Municipality, Kakheti; 41.934487°N 45.416289°E	2007		
Kondoli church of St. John the Baptist	6th century	Kondoli, Telavi Municipality, Kakheti; 41.941062°N 45.587251°E	2007		
Kochalo basilica	6th century	Lagodekhi, Lagodekhi Municipality, Kakheti; 41.836417°N 46.286784°E	2007		
Machi (Toghi) fortress and church	8th–9th century	Lagodekhi Municipality, Kakheti; 41.821389°N 46.354167°E	2007		
Sagarejo church of Saint Peter and Paul	17th–18th century	Sagarejo, Sagarejo Municipality, Kakheti; 41.739621°N 45.316895°E	2007		
Manavi church of the Theotokos	1794	Manavi, Sagarejo Municipality, Kakheti; 41.739621°N 45.316895°E	2007		
Manavi fortress	9th–10th century	Manavi, Sagarejo Municipality, Kakheti; 41.730117°N 45.441732°E	2007		
Ninotsminda Cathedral complex	5th–18th century	Ninotsminda, Sagarejo Municipality, Kakheti; 41.736722°N 45.297805°E	2007		
David Gareja monastery complex: Gareja cave monasteries	Medieval	Sagarejo Municipality, Kakheti; 41.298611°N 45.704722°E	2007		
David Gareja monastery complex: Lavra monastery	Medieval	Sagarejo Municipality, Kakheti; 41.447222°N 45.376467°E	2007		
David Gareja monastery complex: Natslismtsemeli monastery	Medieval	Sagarejo Municipality, Kakheti; 41.298611°N 45.704722°E	2007		
David Gareja monastery complex: Tsamebuli monastery	Medieval	Sagarejo Municipality, Kakheti; 41.456706°N 45.354883°E	2007		
Ujarma: the church of the Holy Cross	5th–18th century	Sagarejo Municipality, Kakheti; 41.811478°N 45.154136°E	2007		
Ujarma: the fortress	5th–18th century	Sagarejo Municipality, Kakheti; 41.811374°N 45.153624°E	2007		
Khashmi church of the Trinity (Katsareti)	6th–18th century	Khashmi, Sagarejo Municipality, Kakheti; 41.793524°N 45.218374°E	2007		
Khashmi church of the Theotokos	14th–15th century	Khashmi, Sagarejo Municipality, Kakheti; 41.800199°N 45.187349°E	2007		
Bodbe Monastery	6th–20th century	Sighnaghi Municipality, Kakheti; 41.606668°N 45.933395°E	2007		
Sighnaghi ramparts	16th–18th century	Sighnaghi, Sighnaghi Municipality, Kakheti; 41.623496°N 45.924123°E	2007		
Sighnaghi bell-tower	18th–19th century	Sighnaghi, Sighnaghi Municipality, Kakheti; 41.622014°N 45.923739°E	2007		
Kolagiri monastery and Berebis Seri caves	11th–12th century	Sagarejo Municipality, Kakheti; 41.446140°N 45.659934°E	2007		
Khirsa monastery of Saint Stephen	6th–18th century	Tibaani, Sighnaghi Municipality, Kakheti; 41.577729°N 46.000838°E	2007		
Nekresi monastery complex	4th–16th century	Qvareli Municipality, Kakheti; 41.972003°N 45.767736°E	2007		
Dzveli Gavazi church	4th–16th century	Akhalsopeli, Qvareli Municipality, Kakheti; 41.913008°N 45.980176°E	2007		
Gremi complex	Late medieval	Eniseli, Qvareli Municipality, Kakheti; 42.002175°N 45.660175°E	2007		
Intsobi monastery of St. John the Baptist	Medieval	Sabue, Qvareli Municipality, Kakheti; 42.076803°N 45.723447°E	2007		
Shilda church of the Theotokos	6th century	Shilda, Qvareli Municipality, Kakheti; 42.010007°N 45.731452°E	2007		
Bartsana church	10th century	Shilda, Qvareli Municipality, Kakheti; 42.010007°N 45.731452°E	2007		
Ozaani church of the Ascension	12th–13th century	Ozaani, Dedoplistsqaro Municipality, Kakheti; 41.555076°N 46.000279°E	2007		
Bolnisi Sioni Cathedral: the basilica, the bell-tower, and the rampart	478–498 (the church), 1678–1688 (the bell-tower), late medieval (the rampart)	Bolnisi Municipality, Kvemo Kartli; 41.388869°N 44.512973°E	2007		
Vanati church	5th–6th century	Bolnisi Municipality, Kvemo Kartli; 41.418565°N 44.548972°E	2007		
Satkhe church	10th–11th century	Kazreti, Bolnisi Municipality, Kvemo Kartli; 41.347554°N 44.432859°E	2007		
Kazreti monastery of the Trinity (Sameba)	13th century	Ispiani/Kazreti, Bolnisi Municipality, Kvemo Kartli; 41.370170°N 44.430842°E	2007		
Akaurta church of the Dormition	5th–6th century	Bolnisi Municipality, Kvemo Kartli; 41.465797°N 44.442404°E	2007		
Arukhlo cyclopean fortress	1st millennium BC	Dagarakhlo, Bolnisi Municipality, Kvemo Kartli; 41.354788°N 44.160616°E	2007		
Mankhuti Upper Church	6th century	Mamkhuti, Bolnisi Municipality, Kvemo Kartli; 41.388264°N 44.719520°E	2007		
Mankhuti Lower Church	6th–7th century	Mamkhuti, Bolnisi Municipality, Kvemo Kartli; 41.388264°N 44.719520°E	2007		
St. Nicholas church	17th–18th century	Tandzia, Bolnisi Municipality, Kvemo Kartli; 41.451718°N 44.360661°E	2007		
Akvaneba church	6th–7th century	Kveshi, Bolnisi Municipality, Kvemo Kartli; 41.441547°N 44.446753°E	2007		
Kolagiri fortress	High medieval	Tsurtavi, Bolnisi Municipality, Kvemo Kartli; 41.466442°N 44.713975°E	2007		
Betania Monastery	12th–13th century	Tbilisi; 41.690036°N 44.611423°E	2007		
Martqopi Monastery complex	Early medieval to the 19th century	Norio, Gardabani Municipality, Kvemo Kartli; 41.827498°N 44.968135°E	2007		
Church of the Ascension	6th–7th century	Ganakhleba, Dmanisi Municipality, Kvemo Kartli; 41.481389°N 44.103333°E	2007		
Petriant chapel (Kukhi church)	1014–1022	Gomareti, Dmanisi Municipality, Kvemo Kartli; 41.495301°N 44.126129°E	2007		
Egrisi complex: the church of St. John the Baptist, the Ruined Chapel, and the Black Chapel	12th–13th century	Gomareti, Dmanisi Municipality, Kvemo Kartli; 41.495301°N 44.126129°E	2007		
Sikhuaant chapel	1034	Gomareti, Dmanisi Municipality, Kvemo Kartli; 41.495301°N 44.126129°E	2007		
Kviratskhoveli stelae	6th–7th century	Gomareti, Dmanisi Municipality, Kvemo Kartli; 41.495301°N 44.126129°E	2007		
Church of the Theotokos of Shavsakdrebi	High medieval	Gomareti, Dmanisi Municipality, Kvemo Kartli; 41.495301°N 44.126129°E	2007		
Church of St. Nicholas of Shavsakdrebi	10th century	Gomareti, Dmanisi Municipality, Kvemo Kartli; 41.495301°N 44.126129°E	2007		
Vardisubani monastery	Medieval	Vardisubani, Dmanisi Municipality, Kvemo Kartli; 41.350000°N 44.350000°E	2007		
Karabulakhi church	10th–11th century	Zemo Karabulakhi, Dmanisi Municipality, Kvemo Kartli; 41.415561°N 44.096669°E	2007		
Kakliani single-nave church	11th century	Kakliani, Dmanisi Municipality, Kvemo Kartli; 41.517169°N 44.233161°E	2007		
Revazasheni church	8th–9th century	Mamula, Dmanisi Municipality, Kvemo Kartli; 41.508420°N 44.193880°E	2007		
Dmanisi historic site: Dmanisi Sioni cathedral	1213–1222	Patara Dmanisi, Dmanisi Municipality, Kvemo Kartli; 41.336424°N 44.342581°E	2007		
Dmanisi historic site: the church of St. Marina, a bell-tower, bathhouses, ramparts, and other structures	Medieval	Patara Dmanisi, Dmanisi Municipality, Kvemo Kartli; 41.336211°N 44.342327°E	2007		
Church of St. Basil	8th–9th century	Sarkineti, Dmanisi Municipality, Kvemo Kartli; 41.498431°N 44.128512°E	2007		
Church of the Ascension	8th–9th century	Sarkineti, Dmanisi Municipality, Kvemo Kartli; 41.498431°N 44.128512°E	2007		
Ukangori church	Late medieval	Ukangori, Dmanisi Municipality, Kvemo Kartli; 41.326169°N 44.395789°E	2007		
Lamazi Saqdari monastery	12th–13th century	Dmanisi Municipality, Kvemo Kartli; 41.459444°N 44.230000°E	2007		
Manglisi cathedral	11th–19th century	Manglisi, Tetritsqaro Municipality, Kvemo Kartli; 41.698475°N 44.356730°E	2007		
Abelia church	1250–1259	Abeliani, Tetritsqaro Municipality, Kvemo Kartli; 41.572359°N 44.500641°E	2007		
Draneti church	10th–11th century	Alekseevka, Tetritsqaro Municipality, Kvemo Kartli; 41.538056°N 44.326944°E	2007		
Gudarekhi monastery	13th century	Gudarekhi, Tetritsqaro Municipality, Kvemo Kartli; 41.591389°N 44.428611°E	2007		
Gudarekhi cross-stone	13th century	Gudarekhi, Tetritsqaro Municipality, Kvemo Kartli	2007		
Salkhino tower	1811	Vashlovani, Tetritsqaro Municipality, Kvemo Kartli; 41.621561°N 44.742187°E	2007		
Nadarbazevi castle	10th–11th century	Ivanovka, Tetritsqaro Municipality, Kvemo Kartli; 41.591650°N 44.341977°E	2007		
Samghereti monastery complex	13th century	Samghereti, Tetritsqaro Municipality, Kvemo Kartli; 41.497661°N 44.414982°E	2007		
Historical monuments of Samshvilde, including Samshvilde Sioni church	Medieval	Samshvilde, Tetritsqaro Municipality, Kvemo Kartli; 41.506966°N 44.503482°E	2007		
Pirghebuli monastery complex	12th–13th century	Tetritsqaro Municipality, Kvemo Kartli; 41.500036°N 44.465344°E	2007		
Birtvisi fortress	High medieval	Tetritsqaro Municipality, Kvemo Kartli; 41.610036°N 44.533491°E	2007		
Khuluti fortress	Late medieval	Pitareti, Tetritsqaro Municipality, Kvemo Kartli; 41.463803°N 44.348611°E	2007		
Pitareti Monastery complex	13th century	Pitareti, Tetritsqaro Municipality, Kvemo Kartli; 41.479881°N 44.319905°E	2007		
Andria settlement with two churches	Early medieval	Kosalari, Tetritsqaro Municipality, Kvemo Kartli; 41.500556°N 44.635000°E	2007		
Ghoubani church of the Forty Martyrs of Sebaste	16th century	Ghoubani, Tetritsqaro Municipality, Kvemo Kartli; 41.629837°N 44.699118°E	2007		
Mamukaant church	8th–9th century	Tsintsqaro, Tetritsqaro Municipality, Kvemo Kartli; 41.548333°N 44.595833°E	2007		
Tskhnari church	13th century	Tsqnari Abano, Tetritsqaro Municipality, Kvemo Kartli; 41.468889°N 44.277778°E	2007		
Red Bridge	17th century	Kirach-Mughanlo, Marneuli Municipality, Kvemo Kartli; 41.329216°N 45.073033°E	2007		
Kalapa church and its complex	13th–18th century	Tserakvi, Marneuli Municipality, Kvemo Kartli; 41.295556°N 44.658889°E	2007		
Tsopi fortress	Early medieval	Tsopi, Marneuli Municipality, Kvemo Kartli; 41.251389°N 44.733611°E	2007		
Tsopi church	5th–6th century	Tsopi, Marneuli Municipality, Kvemo Kartli; 41.246811°N 44.733942°E	2007		
Khozhorni church	High medieval	Khorjorni, Marneuli Municipality, Kvemo Kartli; 41.221289°N 44.686664°E	2007		
St. Demetrius's basilica church	6th century	Tsalka, Tsalka Municipality, Kvemo Kartli	2007		
Avranlo cyclopean fortress	1st millennium BC	Avranlo, Tsalka Municipality, Kvemo Kartli; 41.662222°N 43.883889°E	2007		
Avranlo stone with an asomtavruli inscription	12th–13th century	Avranlo, Tsalka Municipality, Kvemo Kartli; 41.660388°N 43.891550°E	2007		
Aiazmi church of the Theotokos	6th–7th century	Aiazmi, Tsalka Municipality, Kvemo Kartli; 41.576188°N 43.910040°E	2007		
Arjevan-Sarvani church of the Theotokos	11th–12th century	Arjevan-Sarvani, Tsalka Municipality, Kvemo Kartli; 41.698517°N 44.153377°E	2007		
Arjevan-Sarvani church of St. George	11th century	Arjevan-Sarvani, Tsalka Municipality, Kvemo Kartli; 41.698517°N 44.153377°E	2007		
Arjevan-Sarvani church of St. George	11th century	Arjevan-Sarvani, Tsalka Municipality, Kvemo Kartli; 41.698517°N 44.153377°E	2007		
Gokhnari church	High medieval	Arjevan-Sarvani, Tsalka Municipality, Kvemo Kartli; 41.698517°N 44.153377°E	2007		
Burnasheti church	High medieval	Burnasheti, Tsalka Municipality, Kvemo Kartli; 41.627946°N 43.828256°E	2007		
Gumbati cyclopean fortress	2nd-1st millennium BC	Gumbati, Tsalka Municipality, Kvemo Kartli; 41.660278°N 43.914722°E	2007		
Dashbashi church of Saint George	10th–11th century	Dashbashi, Tsalka Municipality, Kvemo Kartli; 41.590468°N 44.128947°E	2007		
Saqdrioni church of Saint Demetrius	High medieval	Saqdrioni, Tsalka Municipality, Kvemo Kartli; 41.591521°N 43.931737°E	2007		
Saqdrioni palace ruins	High medieval	Saqdrioni, Tsalka Municipality, Kvemo Kartli; 41.591521°N 43.931737°E	2007		
Tejisi church of St. Constantine	Late medieval	Tejisi, Tsalka Municipality, Kvemo Kartli; 41.691111°N 44.088333°E	2007		
Tejisi menhir	1st millennium BC	Tejisi, Tsalka Municipality, Kvemo Kartli; 41.691111°N 44.088333°E	2007		
Kushchi church of St. George	6th–7th century	Kushchi, Tsalka Municipality, Kvemo Kartli; 41.614507°N 43.898623°E	2007		
Nardevani cyclopean fortress	1st millennium BC	Nardevani, Tsalka Municipality, Kvemo Kartli; 41.573257°N 43.897967°E	2007		
Santa cyclopean fortress	1st millennium BC	Santa, Tsalka Municipality, Kvemo Kartli; 41.646667°N 44.008333°E	2007		
Santa cyclopean fortress	1st millennium BC	Santa, Tsalka Municipality, Kvemo Kartli; 41.646667°N 44.008333°E	2007		
Church of St. George	High medieval	Akhalsheni, Tsalka Municipality, Kvemo Kartli; 41.664444°N 44.075556°E	2007		
Stone bridge	Late medieval	Akhalsheni, Tsalka Municipality, Kvemo Kartli; 41.664444°N 44.075556°E	2007		
Lamazi Saqdari monastery (Liparitisubani)	1189–1209	Ktsia, Dmanisi Municipality, Kvemo Kartli; 41.460238°N 44.229850°E	2007		
Chochiani church	High medieval	Chochiani, Dmanisi Municipality, Kvemo Kartli; 41.516683°N 44.064875°E	2007		
Gori Fortress	Medieval	Gori, Gori Municipality, Shida Kartli; 41.986171°N 44.108482°E	2007		
Bieti Monastery	9th century	Bieti, Gori Municipality, Shida Kartli; 42.190361°N 44.216255°E	2007		
Vere church of the Theotokos	7th–9th century	Gardateni, Gori Municipality, Shida Kartli; 41.917936°N 44.128421°E	2007		
Vere fortress	9th–10th century	Gardateni, Gori Municipality, Shida Kartli; 41.917648°N 44.122596°E	2007		
Ateni Sioni Church	6th century	Ateni, Gori Municipality, Shida Kartli; 41.903957°N 44.095963°E	2007		
Orbeliani church	8th–9th century	Didi Ateni, Gori Municipality, Shida Kartli; 41.902078°N 44.092527°E	2007		
Eredvi basilica of St. George	906	Eredvi, Eredvi Municipality, Shida Kartli; 42.248447°N 44.038632°E	2007		
Achabeti fortress	16th century	Achabeti, Gori Municipality, Shida Kartli; 42.271584°N 43.952984°E	2007		
Zemo Nikozi church of the Archangel	10th century	Zemo Nikozi, Gori Municipality, Shida Kartli; 42.194943°N 43.958470°E	2007		
Zemo Nikozi church of the Deity complex	6th–17th century	Zemo Nikozi, Gori Municipality, Shida Kartli; 42.196159°N 43.958144°E	2007		
Inauri fortress	8th–9th century	Inauri, Gori Municipality, Shida Kartli; 42.357882°N 44.267749°E	2007		
Uplistsikhe cave-cut complex	Medieval	Uplistsikhe, Gori Municipality, Shida Kartli; 41.967260°N 44.207292°E	2007		
Saorbisi church of St. George	1152, restored 1962	Pitsesi, Gori Municipality, Shida Kartli; 41.842221°N 44.219382°E	2007		
Kvakhvrelebi cave monastery complex	Early medieval	Kvakhvrelebi, Gori Municipality, Shida Kartli; 41.956425°N 44.203573°E	2007		
Ikorta church and castle	1172	Ikorta, Eredvi Municipality, Shida Kartli; 42.166362°N 44.155771°E	2007		
Tiri monastery	13th century	Kvemo Monasteri, Kurta Municipality, Shida Kartli; 42.281908°N 43.928965°E	2007		
Kheiti church of St. Sabbas (Sabatsminda)	13th century	Kheiti, Kurta Municipality, Shida Kartli; 42.242581°N 43.987325°E	2007		
Tskhinvali church of St. George	Late medieval	Tskhinvali, Gori Municipality, Shida Kartli	2007		
Kavti church of St. George	10th–11th century	Tskhinvali, Gori Municipality, Shida Kartli	2007		
Aghaiani church of Saint Nino (Ninotsminda)	8th–10th century	Mount Tkhoti, Kaspi Municipality, Shida Kartli; 41.942409°N 44.457348°E	2007		
Pavnisi church of St. George	9th–10th century	Gariqula, Kaspi Municipality, Shida Kartli; 41.874282°N 44.334672°E	2007		
Bolgarsky mansion	c. 1890	Gariqula, Kaspi Municipality, Shida Kartli; 41.881956°N 44.329730°E	2007		
Tarkhnishvili mansion	c. 1830	Gariqula, Kaspi Municipality, Shida Kartli; 41.887088°N 44.334260°E	2007		
Kaberi church of St. George	1014–1027	Gostibe, Kaspi Municipality, Shida Kartli; 41.814989°N 44.279102°E	2007		
Ertatsminda Cathedral	13th century	Ertatsminda, Kaspi Municipality, Shida Kartli; 41.865358°N 44.324111°E	2007		
Idleti church of St. John the Baptist	6th century	Idleti, Kaspi Municipality, Shida Kartli; 41.860278°N 44.458056°E	2007		
Ikvi church of St. George	11th century	Ikvi, Kaspi Municipality, Shida Kartli; 41.819518°N 44.235207°E	2007		
Lavra church	10th century	Lavriskhevi, Kaspi Municipality, Shida Kartli; 41.817854°N 44.474580°E	2007		
Orbeliani mansion	18th–19th century	Lamisqana, Kaspi Municipality, Shida Kartli; 42.011642°N 44.492181°E	2007		
Metekhi church of the Dormition	13th century	Metekhi, Kaspi Municipality, Shida Kartli; 41.926115°N 44.338892°E	2007		
Niabi church of St. George	10th century	Niabi, Kaspi Municipality, Shida Kartli; 41.909356°N 44.373574°E	2007		
Rkoni castle complex	7th–18th century	Rkoni, Kaspi Municipality, Shida Kartli; 41.812030°N 44.231362°E	2007		
Simon the Stylite lavra	14th–15th century	Rkoni, Kaspi Municipality, Shida Kartli; 41.803056°N 44.224167°E	2007		
Samtavisi Cathedral	1030	Samtavisi, Kaspi Municipality, Shida Kartli; 42.006403°N 44.408971°E	2007		
Kvatakhevi monastery complex	12th–13th century	Tsinarekhi, Kaspi Municipality, Shida Kartli; 41.7933°N 44.4581°E	2007		
Amilakhvari castle	17th–18th century	Kvemo Chala, Kaspi Municipality, Shida Kartli; 42.023310°N 44.393507°E	2007		
Skhvilo fortress	14th–18th century	Kvemo Chala, Kaspi Municipality, Shida Kartli; 42.038558°N 44.417239°E	2007		
Magalaant church complex	15th–18th century	Tsinarekhi, Kaspi Municipality, Shida Kartli; 41.818819°N 44.443444°E	2007		
Tavkavti church and castle complex	8th century	Tsinarekhi, Kaspi Municipality, Shida Kartli; 41.776155°N 44.441124°E	2007		
Marjanidze castle	18th–19th century	Tsinarekhi, Kaspi Municipality, Shida Kartli; 41.836624°N 44.450721°E	2007		
Marjanidze castle	18th–19th century	Tsinarekhi, Kaspi Municipality, Shida Kartli; 41.836624°N 44.450721°E	2007		
Drisi Javakhaant castle complex	High medieval	Chqopiani, Kaspi Municipality, Shida Kartli; 41.866094°N 44.284419°E	2007		
Church of St. Theodore (Kviriketsminda)	Late medieval	Khovle, Kaspi Municipality, Shida Kartli; 41.886389°N 44.233056°E	2007		
Abisi castle complex	18th century	Abisi, Kareli Municipality, Shida Kartli; 42.098333°N 43.759862°E	2007		
Aradeti church of St. George	8th–9th century	Aradeti, Kareli Municipality, Shida Kartli; 42.065190°N 43.882918°E	2007		
Breti complex: churches of St. Pyrrhus and of St. George, and a belltower	6th–9th century	Breti, Kareli Municipality, Shida Kartli; 42.082611°N 43.902611°E	2007		
Dedoplis Mindori archaeological site	1st century BC	Kareli Municipality, Shida Kartli; 42.046850°N 43.860486°E	2007		
Tigva Monastery	1152	Tigva, Tigva Municipality, Shida Kartli; 42.198333°N 43.760278°E	2007		
Mdzovreti fortress	17th century	Ortubani, Kareli Municipality, Shida Kartli; 41.949348°N 43.760082°E	2007		
Ruisi church of the Theotokos	8th–9th century	Ruisi, Kareli Municipality, Shida Kartli; 42.037872°N 43.956937°E	2007		
Samtsevrisi church of St. George	7th century	Samtsevrisi, Kareli Municipality, Shida Kartli; 42.014722°N 43.844444°E	2007		
Urbnisi complex: the Urbnisi Sioni church, ramparts, belltower, bathhouse, winery, and aqueduct	4th century BC – 18th century	Urbnisi, Kareli Municipality, Shida Kartli; 42.010869°N 43.979801°E	2007		
Gigo church	17th century	Qintsvisi, Kareli Municipality, Shida Kartli; 41.977515°N 43.817050°E	2007		
Qintsvisi monastery	12th–13th century	Qintsvisi, Kareli Municipality, Shida Kartli; 41.960698°N 43.837652°E	2007		
Historical town of Ali: churches of the Theotokos and of Usaneti and a bell-tower	16th–17th century	Ali, Khashuri Municipality, Shida Kartli; 42.096886°N 43.642866°E	2007		
"Green church" (Mtsvane saqdari)	12th century	Chandrebi, Kareli Municipality, Shida Kartli; 41.970556°N 43.918611°E	2007		
Church of the Theotokos complex (Deda-Ghvtisa)	16th–17th century	Vaqa, Kareli Municipality, Shida Kartli; 42.041430°N 43.707439°E	2007		
Nabakhtevi church of the Theotokos complex (Deda-Ghvtisa)	15th century	Nabakhtevi, Kareli Municipality, Shida Kartli; 42.062631°N 43.662641°E	2007		
Urtkhva church of St. George	10th–11th century	Urtkhva, Khashuri Municipality, Shida Kartli; 42.045202°N 43.541920°E	2007		
Tsromi church	626–635	Tsromi, Khashuri Municipality, Shida Kartli; 41.993333°N 43.736667°E	2007		
Khtsisi church of John the Baptist	1002	Khtsisi, Khashuri Municipality, Shida Kartli; 41.980645°N 43.676983°E	2007		
Lomisa church of St. George	8th–9th century	Mount Lomisa, Dusheti Municipality, Mtskheta-Mtianeti; 42.411935°N 44.499539°E	2007		
Khopa monastery	13th century	Mosabruni, Akhalgori Municipality, Mtskheta-Mtianeti; 42.093275°N 44.509524°E	2007		
Castle of the dukes of the Ksani	16th–18th century	Akhalgori, Akhalgori Municipality, Mtskheta-Mtianeti; 42.119272°N 44.487676°E	2007		
Church of Armazi on the Ksani	864	Armazi, Akhalgori Municipality, Mtskheta-Mtianeti; 42.168075°N 44.376855°E	2007		
Tsinkibe church of St. Barbara	9th–10th century	Doretkari, Akhalgori Municipality, Mtskheta-Mtianeti; 42.292480°N 44.434561°E	2007		
Alevi church of the Holy Trinity	8th–10th century	Korinta, Akhalgori Municipality, Mtskheta-Mtianeti; 42.171667°N 44.572222°E	2007		
Largvisi Monastery complex	14th–18th century	Largvisi, Akhalgori Municipality, Mtskheta-Mtianeti; 42.268521°N 44.485801°E	2007		
Mosabruni church of the Theotokos	8th–9th century	Mosabruni, Akhalgori Municipality, Mtskheta-Mtianeti; 42.090000°N 44.489293°E	2007		
Kabeni monastery	9th–13th century	Qanchaeti, Akhalgori Municipality, Mtskheta-Mtianeti; 42.156401°N 44.446555°E	2007		
Tskhavati monastery	8th–9th century	Tskhavati, Akhalgori Municipality, Mtskheta-Mtianeti; 42.241873°N 44.495466°E	2007		
Tsirkoli church of the Theotokos	8th century	Tsirkoli, Akhalgori Municipality, Mtskheta-Mtianeti; 42.170989°N 44.474621°E	2007		
Chilashvili castle "Milakhvriantkari"	17th–19th century	Dusheti, Dusheti Municipality, Mtskheta-Mtianeti; 42.088033°N 44.679460°E	2007		
Ananuri castle	16th–18th century	Ananuri, Dusheti Municipality, Mtskheta-Mtianeti; 42.163767°N 44.702809°E	2007		
Akhatani church of St. John the Baptist	Medieval	Akhatani, Dusheti Municipality, Mtskheta-Mtianeti; 41.964444°N 44.810833°E	2007		
Mzetsveri church of St. George	9th–10th century	Buchaani, Dusheti Municipality, Mtskheta-Mtianeti; 42.283033°N 44.692019°E	2007		
Davati church of the Theotokos	8th–9th century	Davati, Dusheti Municipality, Mtskheta-Mtianeti; 41.985080°N 44.813617°E	2007		
Zemo Kodistsqaro castle complex	16th century	Zemo Kodistsqaro, Dusheti Municipality, Mtskheta-Mtianeti; 42.016040°N 44.553882°E	2007		
Mutso fortified village	Medieval	Mutso, Dusheti Municipality, Mtskheta-Mtianeti; 42.607342°N 45.207751°E	2007		
Mchadijvari church of the Archangels	17th–19th century	Mchadijvari, Dusheti Municipality, Mtskheta-Mtianeti; 42.017956°N 44.599169°E	2007		
Bziani churches complex	7th–10th century	Nedzikhi, Dusheti Municipality, Mtskheta-Mtianeti; 42.184722°N 44.792222°E	2007		
Korogho church of the Theotokos complex	10th–11th century	Korogho, Dusheti Municipality, Mtskheta-Mtianeti; 42.460369°N 44.522164°E	2007		
Vazha-Pshavela House Museum	1831–1890	Chargali, Dusheti Municipality, Mtskheta-Mtianeti; 42.323213°N 44.927913°E	2007		
Chinti rock towers	18th century	Chargali, Dusheti Municipality, Mtskheta-Mtianeti; 42.118884°N 44.787430°E	2007		
Zhaleti church of St. George	8th–13th century	Sioni, Tianeti Municipality, Mtskheta-Mtianeti; 42.028568°N 44.971415°E	2007		
Bochorma fortress complex	10th century	Bochorma, Tianeti Municipality, Mtskheta-Mtianeti; 41.909717°N 45.149300°E	2007		
Archili monastery	8th–18th century	Nadokra, Tianeti Municipality, Mtskheta-Mtianeti; 41.961888°N 44.879755°E	2007		
Antiokia church	7th–8th century	Mtskheta, Mtskheta Municipality, Mtskheta-Mtianeti; 41.84135°N 44.724669°E	2007		
Samtavro Monastery: the dome church of the Transfiguration	1030s	Mtskheta, Mtskheta Municipality, Mtskheta-Mtianeti; 41.8464°N 44.7175°E	2007		
Samtavro Monastery: the church of St. Nino	Medieval	Mtskheta, Mtskheta Municipality, Mtskheta-Mtianeti; 41.8464°N 44.7175°E	2007		
Samtavro Monastery: the bell-tower	15th–16th century	Mtskheta, Mtskheta Municipality, Mtskheta-Mtianeti; 41.8464°N 44.7175°E	2007		
Samtavro Monastery: the tower	18th century	Mtskheta, Mtskheta Municipality, Mtskheta-Mtianeti; 41.8464°N 44.7175°E	2007		
Samtavro Monastery: the wall and other structures	19th century	Mtskheta, Mtskheta Municipality, Mtskheta-Mtianeti; 41.8464°N 44.7175°E	2007		
Svetitskhoveli Cathedral: the main church	1010–1029	Mtskheta, Mtskheta Municipality, Mtskheta-Mtianeti; 41.8419°N 44.7211°E	2007		
Svetitskhoveli Cathedral: Catholicos Melchizedek Palace	11th century	Mtskheta, Mtskheta Municipality, Mtskheta-Mtianeti; 41.8419°N 44.7211°E	2007		
Svetitskhoveli Cathedral: the gate	1029	Mtskheta, Mtskheta Municipality, Mtskheta-Mtianeti; 41.8419°N 44.7211°E	2007		
Svetitskhoveli Cathedral: Catholicos Anton II Palace	18th century	Mtskheta, Mtskheta Municipality, Mtskheta-Mtianeti; 41.8419°N 44.7211°E	2007		
Svetitskhoveli Cathedral: the wall and other structures	1787	Mtskheta, Mtskheta Municipality, Mtskheta-Mtianeti; 41.8419°N 44.7211°E	2007		
Armazi fortress	13th–15th century	Mtskheta, Mtskheta Municipality, Mtskheta-Mtianeti; 41.826594°N 44.678931°E	2007		
Bebristsikhe fortress	Medieval	Mtskheta, Mtskheta Municipality, Mtskheta-Mtianeti; 41.855278°N 44.7225°E	2007		
Shio-Mgvime monastery complex	6th–19th century	Mtskheta, Mtskheta Municipality, Mtskheta-Mtianeti; 41.862442°N 44.640703°E	2007		
Machkhani church	8th–9th century	Dighomi, Tbilisi; 41.766256°N 44.597914°E	2007		
Tkhinvali palace and churches	17th–19th century	Tkhinvali, Tbilisi; 41.766256°N 44.597914°E	2007		
Mukhranbatoni palace	19th century	Mukhrani, Mtskheta Municipality, Mtskheta-Mtianeti; 41.941502°N 44.584876°E	2007		
Zedazeni Monastery	8th century	Saguramo, Mtskheta Municipality, Mtskheta-Mtianeti; 41.871331°N 44.765475°E	2007		
Kviratskhoveli church	1669	Skhaltba, Mtskheta Municipality, Mtskheta-Mtianeti; 41.871285°N 44.657016°E	2007		
Telovani church of the Holy Cross (Jvarpatiosani)	8th–9th century	Ksovrisi, Mtskheta Municipality; 41.980340°N 44.548051°E	2007		
Ksani fortress	1511–1514	Mount Sarkineti, Mtskheta Municipality, Mtskheta-Mtianeti; 41.875847°N 44.578026°E	2007		
Tserovani church of the Trinity	11th century	Tserovani, Mtskheta Municipality, Mtskheta-Mtianeti; 41.878927°N 44.680440°E	2007		
Garbani church of St. George	9th–10th century	Garbani, Kazbegi Municipality, Mtskheta-Mtianeti; 42.609286°N 4.592404°E	2007		
Gergeti Trinity Church	14th century	Stepantsminda, Kazbegi Municipality, Mtskheta-Mtianeti; 42.662481°N 44.620352°E	2007		
Betlemi cave monastery	High medieval	Mount Kazbek, Kazbegi Municipality, Mtskheta-Mtianeti; 42.683589°N 44.529726°E	2007		
Zakagori towers	17th century	Truso valley, Kazbegi Municipality, Mtskheta-Mtianeti; 42.611569°N 44.374018°E	2007		
Khevi church of Zion (Sioni)	9th–10th century	Sioni, Kazbegi Municipality, Mtskheta-Mtianeti; 42.603098°N 44.580362°E	2007		
Ghudushauri castle	16th–17th century	Sno, Kazbegi Municipality, Mtskheta-Mtianeti; 42.605347°N 44.638464°E	2007		
Bugeuli church of the Theotokos	16th century	Bugeuli, Ambrolauri Municipality, Racha-Lechkhumi and Kvemo Svaneti; 42.541894°N 43.062593°E	2007		
Zemo Krikhi church of the Archangels	10th–11th century	Zemo Krikhi, Ambrolauri Municipality, Racha-Lechkhumi and Kvemo Svaneti; 42.496856°N 43.193605°E	2007		
Kldisubani church of the Theotokos	10th–11th century	Kldisubani, Ambrolauri Municipality, Racha-Lechkhumi and Kvemo Svaneti; 42.556111°N 43.110278°E	2007		
Nikortsminda Cathedral	1010–1014	Nikortsminda, Ambrolauri Municipality, Racha-Lechkhumi and Kvemo Svaneti; 42.459400°N 43.087800°E	2007		
Raketi church of St. Nicholas	11th century	Patara Oni, Oni Municipality, Racha-Lechkhumi and Kvemo Svaneti; 42.536667°N 42.978889°E	2007		
Khimshi church of St. George	11th century	Khimshi, Ambrolauri Municipality, Racha-Lechkhumi and Kvemo Svaneti; 42.521667°N 43.187778°E	2007		
Mami church of the Savior (Matskhvara)	10th–11th century	Mami, Lentekhi Municipality, Racha-Lechkhumi and Kvemo Svaneti; 42.845772°N 42.874470°E	2007		
Kvishi church of the Archangel (Taringzel)	High medieval	Sasashi, Lentekhi Municipality, Racha-Lechkhumi and Kvemo Svaneti; 42.789122°N 42.988499°E	2007		
Saqdari church of St. George (Jgrag)	High medieval	Saqdari, Lentekhi Municipality, Racha-Lechkhumi and Kvemo Svaneti; 42.843552°N 42.821712°E	2007		
Tvibi church of the Archangel (Taringzel)	10th–11th century	Tvibi, Lentekhi Municipality, Racha-Lechkhumi and Kvemo Svaneti; 42.863411°N 42.865465°E	2007		
Church of the Theotokos (Lamaria)	High medieval	Chikhareshi, Lentekhi Municipality, Racha-Lechkhumi and Kvemo Svaneti; 42.790000°N 43.049722°E	2007		
Church of the Archangels (Taringzel)	High medieval	Chukuli, Lentekhi Municipality, Racha-Lechkhumi and Kvemo Svaneti; 42.808003°N 43.017007°E	2007		
Church of the Archangels (Taringzel)	10th–12th century	Chukuli, Lentekhi Municipality, Racha-Lechkhumi and Kvemo Svaneti; 42.808003°N 43.017007°E	2007		
Church of the Archangels (Taringzel)	10th–12th century	Chukuli, Lentekhi Municipality, Racha-Lechkhumi and Kvemo Svaneti; 42.808003°N 43.017007°E	2007		
Church of St. George (Jgrag)	11th–12th century	Zhakhunderi, Lentekhi Municipality, Racha-Lechkhumi and Kvemo Svaneti; 42.796111°N 43.017500°E	2007		
Oni Synagogue	1895	Oni, Oni Municipality, Racha-Lechkhumi and Kvemo Svaneti; 42.587013°N 43.446366°E	2007		
Church of the Archangels	High medieval	Zemo Bari, Oni Municipality, Racha-Lechkhumi and Kvemo Svaneti; 42.518889°N 43.302500°E	2007		
Church of St. George	Medieval	Sori, Oni Municipality, Racha-Lechkhumi and Kvemo Svaneti; 42.566663°N 43.279987°E	2007		
Martvili Monastery	7th–11th century	Martvili, Martvili Municipality, Samegrelo-Zemo Svaneti; 42.4053°N 42.3778°E	2007		
Tsaishi cathedral of the Dormition	13th–14th century	Tsaishi, Zugdidi Municipality, Samegrelo-Zemo Svaneti; 42.426591°N 41.811747°E	2007		
Tsalenjikha Cathedral of the Transfiguration	14th century	Tsalenjikha, Tsalenjikha Municipality, Samegrelo-Zemo Svaneti; 42.600465°N 42.081535°E	2007		
Skuri church	13th century	Skuri, Tsalenjikha Municipality, Samegrelo-Zemo Svaneti; 42.683883°N 42.162909°E	2007		
Lailashi church	Medieval	Lailashi, Tsageri Municipality, Racha-Lechkhumi and Kvemo Svaneti; 42.604934°N 42.860918°E	2007		
Church of St. George	17th century	Nakuraleshi, Tsageri Municipality, Racha-Lechkhumi and Kvemo Svaneti; 42.551507°N 42.753113°E	2007		
Khobi monastery of the Dormition	13th–14th century	Nojikhevi, Khobi Municipality, Samegrelo-Zemo Svaneti; 42.335833°N 41.906944°E	2007		
Laghami church of the Savior (Matskhvar)	13th–14th century	Mestia, Mestia Municipality, Samegrelo-Zemo Svaneti; 43.053523°N 42.739233°E	2007		
Church of St. George (Jgrag)	Medieval	Adishi, Mestia Municipality, Samegrelo-Zemo Svaneti; 42.996136°N 42.904601°E	2007		
Church of the Savior and a tower	Medieval	Adishi, Mestia Municipality, Samegrelo-Zemo Svaneti; 42.997257°N 42.915927°E	2007		
Church of the Archangels (Taringzel)	Medieval	Adishi, Mestia Municipality, Samegrelo-Zemo Svaneti; 42.996136°N 42.904601°E	2007		
Zagrali church of the Archangels (Taringzel)	High medieval	Adishi, Mestia Municipality, Samegrelo-Zemo Svaneti; 42.996136°N 42.904601°E	2007		
Church of the Savior (Matskhvar)	11th century	Adishi, Mestia Municipality, Samegrelo-Zemo Svaneti; 42.994988°N 42.915498°E	2007		
Church of St. George (Jgrag)	High medieval	Adishi, Mestia Municipality, Samegrelo-Zemo Svaneti; 42.993575°N 42.916102°E	2007		
Church of the Savior (Matskhvar)	Medieval	Tavrali, Mestia Municipality, Samegrelo-Zemo Svaneti; 43.068056°N 42.424722°E	2007		
Church of the Prophet Jonah (Ian)	Medieval	Ienashi, Mestia Municipality, Samegrelo-Zemo Svaneti; 43.012363°N 42.630115°E	2007		
Iprari church of the Archangels (Taringzel)	11th century	Iprari, Mestia Municipality, Samegrelo-Zemo Svaneti; 42.936667°N 42.924444°E	2007		
Ipkhi church of St. George (Jgrag)	Medieval	Ipkhi, Mestia Municipality, Samegrelo-Zemo Svaneti; 43.021631°N 42.613029°E	2007		
Lashtkhveri church of the Archangel (Taringzel)	Medieval	Lashtkhveri, Mestia Municipality, Samegrelo-Zemo Svaneti; 43.032222°N 42.695000°E	2007		
Kemlat Ioseliani tower	Medieval	Lakhiri, Mestia Municipality, Samegrelo-Zemo Svaneti; 43.054444°N 42.813611°E	2007		
Mkheri church of St. George (Jgrag)	Medieval	Lahili, Mestia Municipality, Samegrelo-Zemo Svaneti; 43.054444°N 42.813611°E	2007		
Church of the Savior (Matskhvar)	10th–11th century	Matskhvarishi, Mestia Municipality, Samegrelo-Zemo Svaneti; 43.011818°N 42.568170°E	2007		
Church of the Archangel (Taringzel)	Medieval	Matskhvarishi, Mestia Municipality, Samegrelo-Zemo Svaneti; 43.011818°N 42.568170°E	2007		
Church of the Savior (Matskhvar)	Medieval	Murqmeli, Mestia Municipality, Samegrelo-Zemo Svaneti; 42.916667°N 43.000000°E	2007		
Church of the Savior (Matskhvar)	Medieval	Nesguni, Mestia Municipality, Samegrelo-Zemo Svaneti; 43.037778°N 42.698611°E	2007		
Church of the Theotokos (Lamaria)	10th century	Zhibiani, Mestia Municipality, Samegrelo-Zemo Svaneti; 42.918354°N 43.019656°E	2007		
Church of St. George (Jgrag)	10th century	Svipi, Mestia Municipality, Samegrelo-Zemo Svaneti; 43.059722°N 42.5°E	2007		
Historical monuments of Chazhashi	Medieval	Chazhashi, Mestia Municipality, Samegrelo-Zemo Svaneti; 42.9075°N 43.010833°E	2007	UNESCO World Heritage Site	
Church of the Savior (Matskhvar)	Medieval	Chvabiani, Mestia Municipality, Samegrelo-Zemo Svaneti; 43.0425°N 42.849722°E	2007		
Church of the Archangel (Taringzel)	Medieval	Tsvirmi, Mestia Municipality, Samegrelo-Zemo Svaneti; 43.0425°N 42.849722°E	2007		
Church of the Savior (Matskhvar)	Medieval	Tsvirmi, Mestia Municipality, Samegrelo-Zemo Svaneti; 43.0425°N 42.849722°E	2007		
Church of the Archangel "Naka Taringzel"	Medieval	Tsvirmi, Mestia Municipality, Samegrelo-Zemo Svaneti; 43.0425°N 42.849722°E	2007		
Church of St. George (Jgrag)	Medieval	Tsvirmi, Mestia Municipality, Samegrelo-Zemo Svaneti; 43.0425°N 42.849722°E	2007		
Church of the Savior (Matskhvar)	Medieval	Chokhuldi, Mestia Municipality, Samegrelo-Zemo Svaneti; 43.068611°N 42.609444°E	2007		
Church of the Archangel (Taringzel)	Medieval	Khaishi, Mestia Municipality, Samegrelo-Zemo Svaneti; 42.944167°N 42.185278°E	2007		
Church of Saints Cyricus and Julitta "Lagurka"	11th–12th century	Khe, Mestia Municipality, Samegrelo-Zemo Svaneti; 42.938611°N 42.906667°E	2007		
Ilia Gulbani tower	Medieval	Khe, Mestia Municipality, Samegrelo-Zemo Svaneti; 42.938611°N 42.906667°E	2007		
Eki monastery of St. John the Baptist	13th century	Eki, Senaki Municipality, Samegrelo-Zemo Svaneti; 42.336179°N 42.115987°E	2007		
Nokalakevi historical site	Early medieval	Senaki Municipality, Samegrelo-Zemo Svaneti; 42.357222°N 42.193889°E	2007		
Shkhepi fortress	Medieval	Dzveli Senaki, Senaki Municipality, Samegrelo-Zemo Svaneti; 42.292451°N 42.111556°E	2007		
Jikheti monastery	Medieval	Jikhetis Monasteri, Lanchkhuti Municipality, Guria; 42.069311°N 42.156454°E	2007		
Gora-Berezhouli arboretum	18th–19th century	Goraberezhouli, Chokhatauri Municipality, Guria; 42.007683°N 42.205950°E	2007		
Eristavi mansion	18th century	Goraberezhouli, Chokhatauri Municipality, Guria; 42.007683°N 42.205950°E	2007		
Erketi church of the Archangel	High medieval	Zemo Erketi, Chokhatauri Municipality, Guria; 41.983333°N 42.273333°E	2007		
Achi Monastery	Medieval	Achi, Ozurgeti Municipality, Guria; 41.83611°N 42.001389°E	2007		
Likhauri monastery	Medieval	Likhauri, Ozurgeti Municipality, Guria; 41.883333°N 42.011667°E	2007		
Shemokmedi Monastery	15th–19th century	Shemokmedi, Ozurgeti Municipality, Guria; 41.907222°N 42.0625°E	2007		
Jumati monastery of the Archangels	16th–18th century	Dzirijumati, Ozurgeti Municipality, Guria; 42.029444°N 41.983333°E	2007		
Kvirike mosque	1861	Kvirike, Kobuleti Municipality, Adjara; 41.766072°N 41.838366°E	2007		
Petra-Tsikhisdziri fortress	6th century	Tsikhisdziri, Kobuleti Municipality, Adjara; 41.768333°N 41.753333°E	2007		
Akho mosque	1817–1818	Akho, Keda Municipality, Adjara; 41.648222°N 42.059972°E	2007		
Dandalo bridge	11th–12th century	Dandalo, Keda Municipality, Adjara; 41.663333°N 42.1075°E	2007		
Makhuntseti bridge	11th–12th century	Kvemo Makhuntseti, Keda Municipality, Adjara; 41.570468°N 41.859938°E	2007		
Tskhmorisi bridge	Medieval	Tskhmorisi, Keda Municipality, Adjara; 41.636667°N 42.059722°E	2007		
Tsoniarisi bridge	Medieval	Tsoniarisi, Keda Municipality, Adjara; 41.661111°N 42.023611°E	2007		
Varjanauli bridge	Late medieval	Varjanauli, Kobuleti Municipality, Adjara; 41.788500°N 41.961250°E	2007		
Purtio bridge	Medieval	Zamleti, Shuakhevi Municipality, Adjara; 41.654492°N 42.263511°E	2007		
Kokoleti bridge	18th century	Kokoleti, Khelvachauri Municipality, Adjara; 41.5°N 41.866667°E	2007		
Tskhemlara bridge	Late medieval	Tskhemlara, Khelvachauri Municipality, Adjara; 41.509956°N 41.820631°E	2007		
Beghleti mosque	19th century	Beghleti, Khulo Municipality, Adjara; 41.640556°N 42.409444°E	2007		
Didachara mosque	1831–1832	Didachara, Khulo Municipality, Adjara; 41.640556°N 42.409444°E	2007		
Bridge	Late medieval	Okruashvilebi, Khulo Municipality, Adjara; 41.658056°N 42.320556°E	2007		
Skhalta Cathedral complex	13th century	Qinchauri, Khulo Municipality, Adjara; 41.658056°N 42.320556°E	2007		
Khikhadziri fortress	Medieval	Khikhadziri, Khulo Municipality, Adjara; 41.545000°N 42.461389°E	2007		
Besleti Bridge	12th–13th century	Sukhumi, Abkhazia; 43.03064°N 41.0761°E	2007		
Dioscurias fortress	2nd BC century	Sukhumi, Abkhazia; 42.995333°N 41.01745°E	2007		
Bedia Cathedral	10th–13th century	Agubedia, Ochamchire, Abkhazia; 42.7672°N 41.6689°E	2007		
Ilori Church of St. George	11th century	Ilori, Ochamchire, Abkhazia; 42.7672°N 41.6689°E	2007		
Mokvi Cathedral	10th century	Mokvi, Ochamchire, Abkhazia; 42.696111°N 41.499722°E	2007		
Church of St. Simon the Canaanite	9th–10th century, reconstructed in the 19th century	New Athos, Gudauta, Abkhazia; 43.090556°N 40.816389°E	2007		
Iverian Mountain monastery complex	8th–9th century, reconstructed in the 19th century	New Athos, Gudauta, Abkhazia; 43.1°N 40.8°E	2007		
Achandara dolmens	2nd millennium BC	Achandara, Gudauta, Abkhazia; 43.183070°N 40.721729°E	2007		
Bzyb fort and church	Medieval	Bzyb, Gagra, Abkhazia; 43.231083°N 40.378778°E	2007		
Aba-ata church	Medieval	Lykhny, Gudauta, Abkhazia; 43.122923°N 40.625494°E	2007		
Lykhny complex: church and Shervashidze palace	10th century	Lykhny, Gudauta, Abkhazia; 43.139817°N 40.618042°E	2007		
Pitsunda Cathedral	10th century	Pitsunda, Gagra, Abkhazia; 43.159889°N 40.339°E	2007		
Gantiadi Church	6th century	Gantiadi, Gagra, Abkhazia; 43.379417°N 40.070908°E	2007		
Dranda Cathedral	6th–7th century	Dranda, Gulripshi, Abkhazia; 42.874176°N 41.162294°E	2007		
Atashgah of Tbilisi	Medieval	3 Gomi Street, Tbilisi; 41.68885°N 44.80559°E	2007		
Art Museum of Georgia	1835	4 Pushkin Street, Tbilisi; 41.697022°N 44.800722°E	2007		
Tbilisi National Gallery	1883	11 Rustaveli Avenue, Tbilisi; 41.698313°N 44.798785°E	2007		
Georgian National Opera Theater	1896	25 Rustaveli Avenue / 1 Revaz Lagidze Street, Tbilisi; 41.701306°N 44.796167°E	2007		
Simon Janashia Museum of Georgia	1927	3 Rustaveli Avenue, Tbilisi; 41.696°N 44.8003°E	2007		
Museum of the History of Tbilisi (Caravanserai)	18th century – 1912	8 Sioni Street, Tbilisi; 41.690970°N 44.807769°E	2007		
Ilia Chavchavadze House Museum	19th century	Saguramo, Mtskheta Municipality, Mtskheta-Mtianeti; 41.892002°N 44.760516°E	2009		
Ilia Chavchavadze Museum: mansion, tower, windmill, etc.	16th–19th century	Qvareli, Qvareli Municipality, Kakheti; 41.952955°N 45.814659°E	2009		
Armaziskhevi complex of the pitiaksh	2nd–3rd century	Mtskheta, Mtskheta Municipality, Mtskheta-Mtianeti; 41.838690°N 44.675060°E	2010		
Samtavro necropolis	18th century BC – 8th century AD	Mtskheta, Mtskheta Municipality, Mtskheta-Mtianeti; 41.851378°N 44.719178°E	2010		
"Royal tomb" of Mtskheta	1st–2nd century	4 Rustaveli Street, Mtskheta, Mtskheta Municipality, Mtskheta-Mtianeti; 41.837424°N 44.698446°E	2010		
Bebris-tsikhe fortress	Medieval	Mtskheta, Mtskheta Municipality, Mtskheta-Mtianeti; 41.855278°N 44.7225°E	2009		
Alexander Kazbegi House Museum	19th century	Stepantsminda, Kazbegi Municipality, Mtskheta-Mtianeti; 42.658230°N 44.640620°E	2010		
Armaztsikhe (Bagineti)	4th century BC – 8th century AD	Mtskheta, Mtskheta Municipality, Mtskheta-Mtianeti; 41.837004°N 44.721685°E	2011		
Atoneli Street		Akhaltsikhe, Akhaltsikhe Municipality, Samtskhe-Javakheti; 41.6435°N 42.98096°E	2011		
Gogebashvili Street		Akhaltsikhe, Akhaltsikhe Municipality, Samtskhe-Javakheti; 41.64373°N 42.97091°E	2011		
Gogebashvili Street		Akhaltsikhe, Akhaltsikhe Municipality, Samtskhe-Javakheti; 41.64373°N 42.97091°E	2011		
Guramishvili Street		Akhaltsikhe, Akhaltsikhe Municipality, Samtskhe-Javakheti; 41.64453°N 42.97931°E	2011		
Khmaladze Street		Akhaltsikhe, Akhaltsikhe Municipality, Samtskhe-Javakheti; 41.64466°N 42.97782°E	2011		
Kazbegi Street		Akhaltsikhe, Akhaltsikhe Municipality, Samtskhe-Javakheti; 41.64455°N 42.97556°E	2011		
Kharischirashvili Street		Akhaltsikhe, Akhaltsikhe Municipality, Samtskhe-Javakheti; 41.64364°N 42.97354°E	2011		
Tsikhisdziri Street		Akhaltsikhe, Akhaltsikhe Municipality, Samtskhe-Javakheti; 41.64309°N 42.97944°E	2011		
Modinakhe fortress	c. 1730	Sachkhere, Sachkhere Municipality, Imereti; 42.351022°N 43.424362°E	2011		
Enguri Dam	1961–1972	Jvari, Tsalenjikha Municipality, Samegrelo-Zemo Svaneti; 42.759167°N 42.031944°E	2015		
Chachkari, historical village of	Prehistoric to the 19th century	Aspindza Municipality, Samtskhe-Javakheti; 41.384765°N 43.286502°E	2016		
Tsilkani church of the Theotokos	5th century	Tsilkani, Mtskheta Municipality, Mtskheta-Mtianeti; 41.949573°N 44.658064°E	2016		
Dolochopi basilica	4th–5th century	Qvareli, Qvareli Municipality, Kakheti; 41.973568°N 45.810356°E	2016		
Chakvinji fortress	5th–17th century	Jikhashkari, Zugdidi Municipality, Samegrelo-Zemo Svaneti; 42.490967°N 41.980569°E	2017		
Nekresi fire temple	3rd–4th century	Shilda, Qvareli Municipality, Kakheti; 41.967379°N 45.761017°E	2017		
Chabukauri basilica	4th–6th century	Shilda, Qvareli Municipality, Kakheti; 41.977550°N 45.756810°E	2017		
Vani archaeological site	8th–1st century BC	Vani, Vani Municipality, Imereti; 42.085050°N 42.504008°E	2018		
Ageurta historical village	17th–18th century	Akhmeta Municipality, Kakheti; 42.363333°N 45.670833°E	2018		
Girevi historical village	Late medieval	Akhmeta Municipality, Kakheti; 42.497864°N 45.482887°E	2018		
Dakiurta historical village	Late medieval	Akhmeta Municipality, Kakheti; 42.498864°N 45.483110°E	2018		
Indurta historical village	Late medieval	Akhmeta Municipality, Kakheti; 42.446849°N 45.436156°E	2018		
Tsaro historical village	Late medieval	Akhmeta Municipality, Kakheti; 42.432012°N 45.476186°E	2018		
Chontio historical village	Late medieval	Akhmeta Municipality, Kakheti; 42.513647°N 45.455462°E	2018		
Bobnevi church of St. John the Baptist	1661–1683	Bobnevi, Gori Municipality, Shida Kartli; 41.887268°N 44.007995°E	2018		
Mravaldzali church of St. George	11th century, reconstructed 1894	Mravaldzali, Oni Municipality, Racha-Lechkhumi and Kvemo Svaneti; 42.515043°N 43.343558°E	2018		
Nakipari church of St. George	10th century	Nakipari, Mestia Municipality, Samegrelo-Zemo Svaneti; 43.010545°N 42.818912°E	2018		
