= Diklo =

Diklo may refer to:

- Diklo, Zadar, a former village now a part of the city in Croatia
- Diklo, Georgia, a village near Akhmeta
