= Telovani church of the Holy Cross =

- თელოვნის ჯვარპატიოსნის ეკლესია
- Telovani church of the Holy Cross.
- Interactive map of Telovani church of the Holy Cross
- Location: Ksovrisi, Mtskheta Municipality; Mtskheta-Mtianeti, Georgia
- Coordinates: 41.980340°N 44.548051°E
- Type: Tetraconch

The Telovani church of the Holy Cross (Georgian: თელოვნის ჯვარპატიოსნის ეკლესია, romanized: telovnis jvarp'at'iosnis ek'lesia) is an 8th–9th-century Georgian Orthodox church in the Mtskheta Municipality in Georgia's eastern region of Mtskheta-Mtianeti. It is a domed triconch design, with the pastophoria on both sides of the sanctuary. The interior contains now heavily damaged murals, including one of the earliest Georgian depictions of the Mandylion. The church is inscribed on the list of Georgia's Immovable Cultural Monuments of National Significance.

== Layout ==
The church of the Holy Cross (Jvarpatiosani) is located in the Mtskheta Municipality, about 3 km east of the village of Ksovrisi, on the territory of the now-extinct settlement of Telovani.

The building, measuring 9.7 × 10.5 m, is set in a triconch plan, with the transverse arms much narrower and lower than the sanctuary and the western arm. This makes the edifice somewhat elongated on the east-west axis. The church is built mostly of cobblestone; dressed limestone and travertine blocks are used in important structural elements and decoration. The building can be accessed through three doorways, all in the rectangular western arm. The projecting apse of the sanctuary is flanked by two apsed pastophoria. The transition from the rectangular bay to the dome circle is effected through squinches. The drum of the dome is octagonal, pierced with four windows and adorned with decorative arches. Both outer and inner walls were plastered. The church was substantially repaired and a belfry was annexed to the west wall in the 18th century. Systematic restoration took place between 1952 and 1954 and again in 2007.

The interior of the church bears fragments of the 9th–10th-century frescoes. They are heavily damaged, including an image of the Mandylion, labelled as "the Holy Face of God" and surrounded by the Apostles, above the apse window. The image may have been influenced by the Abgar Legend and have influenced Georgian depictions of the Mandylion in the following centuries.
