= Kaberi church of St. George =

Church in Kaspi Municipality, Georgia

Kaberi church of St. George (Georgian: კაბერის წმინდა გიორგის ეკლესია, romanized: k'aberis ts'minda giorgis ek'lesia) is a Georgian Orthodox church in the Kaspi Municipality in Georgia's east-central region of Shida Kartli, 1 kilometre (0.62 mi) from the village Gostibe. According to the inscription made in Georgian Asomtavruli script, the church was built in the period of 1014-1027. On November 7, 2006, according to the decree of the President of Georgia, it was awarded the category of immovable cultural monument of national importance.

== Architecture and fittings ==
The structure is damaged: the vault is destroyed, only the conch and the western wall have survived, the cornice is absent. The church is aisleless,12.7 by 11.9 metres (42 ft × 39 ft), built with rough gray stones of uneven sizes; well-worked quadra (cut stone) are used in the structural part of the interior, while the walls are erected with fine stones and are plastered. The western part of the southern wall is equipped with an entrance that has a dome shape in the interior and is covered with architrave on the exterior. Arched window is observed on the slightly elevated, horseshoe shaped apse axis, and square-angled niches on the sides. The vault rested on the buttresses connected to the rounded-bottom consoles. The surviving triumphal and western arcs have slight lancet shape. Two windows are cut in the southern wall. A sarcophagus is placed in the hall western part of the western wall. Fragments of paintings have survived on the church walls.

The arrangement of the dressing stones gives a special artistic touch to the eastern façade wall. Here three raised crosses are depicted on top of the window. Pale yellow rectangular stone is inserted in the center of the western façade, with embossed wide shaft around it. Seven-line construction inscription is inscribed in Georgian Asomtavruli script on the stone, where in addition to the church construction date and the builder Asad, the son of Sanivaj, King George and Catholicos Melchizedek, Archbishop of Bedia Sofron are mentioned. An indented cross is carved in the narrow yellow stone along the rock with inscription. A similar cross is observed on the solid rock in the right corner of the lower façade. Cornice was composed of obliquely sheared plane and narrow shelf. The church has two annexes: prothesis to the north and eukterion to the south. Prothesis connects to the church through the door cut in the southern wall. Slightly elevated horseshoe shaped apse has a window and two niches. Window is decorated with a narrow ornament on top. The floor in the prothesis is pulled up and gravestones are seen. Eukterion appears to have been constructed later along the entire length of the southern wall. Its vault and parts of the walls are missing. Arched entrance is cut in the western part of the southern wall, opposite from the church door. Apse has a semi-circle shape. Five-span sandstone arch built along the southern wall of the church forms the heel of the eukterion vault.
