= Mtsvane Monastery =

- მწვანე მონასტერი
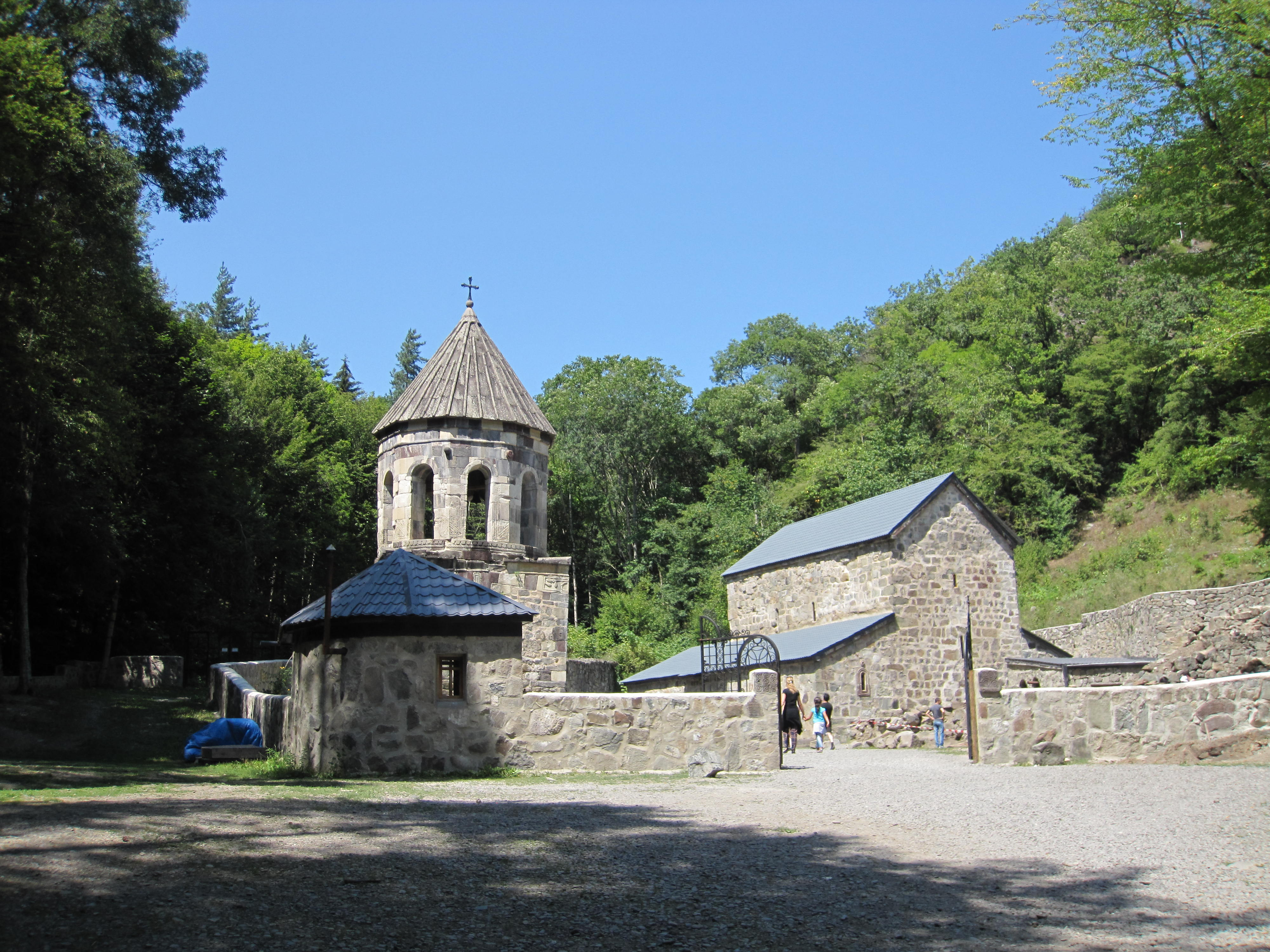
- Mtsvane Monastery
- Interactive map of Mtsvane Monastery
- Location: Chitakhevi, Borjomi Municipality, Samtskhe-Javakheti, Georgia
- Coordinates: 41.810417°N 43.309858°E
- Type: Three-nave basilica and bell-tower

The Chitakhevi church of Saint George (Georgian: ჩითახევის წმინდა გიორგის ეკლესია, romanized: chitakhevis ts'minda giorgis ek'lesia) is a medieval church in Georgia, located in the country's south-central Borjomi valley in the Samtskhe-Javakheti region. It is popularly known as Mtsvane Monastery (მწვანე მონასტერი, mts'vane monast'eri), that is, the Green Monastery. Abandoned for more than two hundred years, the monastery was restored to Christian use in 2003. It is a popular site of tourism and pilgrimage. The monastic church and bell-tower are inscribed on the list of the Immovable Cultural Monuments of National Significance of Georgia.

== History ==
The monastery is located at the village of Chitakhevi, some 12 km southwest of the town of Borjomi, in the Borjomi Municipality, Samtskhe-Javakheti region. It is located in a narrow wooded gorge at the southwest section of the Borjomi-Kharagauli National Park. The monastery's history is unknown. Locally held belief of its dedication to Saint George found a likely epigraphic confirmation in an antefix fragment with the name of Saint George, unearthed in 2012. After the depopulation of the Borjomi valley as a result of incessant warfare and brigandage in the 18th century, the monastery was abandoned and left to decay. The monastery premises, overgrown by wild greenery, were partially reclaimed from nature in 1978, restored in 1988, and repopulated by Georgian monks in 2003. An upsurge in pilgrimage followed, driven by a belief that stones in the nearby stream acquired a reddish hue after a massacre of local monks by the soldiers of the Persian shah Tahmasp I in the 1550s.

== Layout ==
The Chitakhevi Monastery consists of a three-nave basilica, stylistically dated to the late 9th or 10th century, and a two-storey bell-tower, likewise dated to the 15th or 16th century. There are remnants of old monastic cells and some accessory structures nearby. The church is built of coarsely hewn ashlar and rubble; principal constructional elements such as columns, pilasters, and arched are made in neatly hewn green-tinged ashlar. The building measures 14.5 x 19.2 metres. The central nave is flanked, on the south and west, by a two-sided aisle. It terminates in a semicircular apse on the south and pastophoria on the north. In the north corner of the apse there is a narrow door, internally arched and externally topped by an architrave. The church is poorly lit, mainly through two windows cut in the apse. Both the internal and external walls are plain, devoid of any significant decoration; traces of frescoes, probably executed in the 12th or 13th century, survive in the apse and on the west wall. A bell-tower stands a few metres southeast of the church. It is a two-storey structure. The ground floor houses a small chapel; the upper floor is a belfry with arched, parallel-sided apertures supported on massive columns.
