= Melnisi fortress =

Medieval fortress ruins in Georgia

- მელნისის ციხე
- Location: Adigeni Municipality, Samtskhe-Javakheti, Georgia
- Coordinates: 41.71382633393266°N 42.83860084992413°E

The Melnisi fortress (Georgian: მელნისის ციხე) is a ruined medieval fortress in the Adigeni Municipality, Georgia. The monument is perched on a hill at the altitude of 1379 meters above sea level, on the east bank of the Otskhe river. It overlooks to the east the village of Saghrdze, some 4 km northwest to the townlet of Abastumani. The fortress is currently almost completely in ruins, only parts of the eastern tower and western wall still extant. The monument dates to the High Middle Ages and might have been of great importance at that time as it enjoyed a commanding position along the road leading from the province of Samtskhe to the western regions of Georgia. In 2006, the Melnisi fortress was inscribed on the list of Immovable Cultural Monuments of National Significance of Georgia.
