= Jruchi Monastery =

Church in Imereti, Georgia

- ჯრუჭის მონასტერი
- Interactive map of Jruchi Monastery
- Location: Tskhomareti, Sachkhere Municipality; Imereti, Georgia
- Coordinates: 42.398817°N 43.362851°E
- Type: Monastery complex (ruined)

The Jruchi Monastery of Saint George (Georgian: ჯრუჭის წმინდა გიორგის სახელობის მონასტერი, romanized: jruch'is ts'minda giorgis sakhelobis monast'eri) is a ruined Georgian Orthodox monastic church in the western Georgian region of Imereti. Founded in the 10th or 11th century, it was remodeled and rebuilt several times until it acquired its final architectural style by 1846. The church was almost completely destroyed in the 1991 Racha earthquake, only a portion of its wall remaining standing amid a rubble. The monastery is inscribed on the list of the Immovable Cultural Monuments of National Significance of Georgia.

The Jruchi church at the headwaters of the Jruchula, a right-bank affluent of the Qvirila River near the modern-village of Tskhomareti, Sachkhere Municipality, on what historically was a frontier between the regions of Imereti and Racha. Exactly when the church was built is unknown; epigraphic analysis of a surviving church inscription as well as the style of sculpted architectural elements suggests the 9th/10th or 11th century as the most likely time of its construction. At some point in the 16th or 17th century the church passed in possession of the Tsereteli, one of the leading princely families of the Kingdom of Imereti, who probably acquired it from the Palavandishvili. By that time, the church, originally set in a plan of a three-nave basilica, had been remodeled into a domed building. In the 1730s, dukes of Racha dispossessed the Tsereteli of Jruchi and converted the monastery into a military stronghold. Sometime between 1753 and 1763, King Solomon I of Imereti divested the duke of Racha of its new possession, reestablished the convent, and restored it to the Tsereteli. The church was substantially reconstructed and expanded, between 1804 and 1843, by the metropolitan bishop David Tsereteli during his long tenure in various clerical positions in western Georgia.

The Jruchi Monastery housed many treasured church items, both locally produced and brought from elsewhere in Georgia. These included, among others, two illuminated manuscripts of the Gospel books, known as Jruchi I, dated to 936, and Jruchi II, dated to the late 12th century.

Under the Soviet rule, the monastery was abolished and its antiquities were removed for safekeeping to the museums in Kutaisi and Tbilisi. The church, left in disuse and disrepair, was heavily affected by rainfalls and moisture. In April 1991, it was devastated by a strong earthquake. Church services continued to be occasionally held at the ruins and the territory was cleaned of debris. In 2018, a full-scale restoration project was announced.
