= Pirghebuli Monastery =

Georgian Orthodox monastery in Georgia

Pirghebuli monastery
- პირღებულის მონასტერი
- Interactive map of Pirghebuli monastery
- Location: Tetritsqaro Municipality, Kvemo Kartli, Georgia
- Coordinates: 41.500036°N 44.465344°E
- Type: Monastery complex

Pirghebuli monastery (Georgian: პირღებულის მონასტერი, romanized: p'irghebulis monast'eri) is a medieval Georgian Orthodox monastery in the Khrami river valley in Georgia's Kvemo Kartli region. Dated to the late 12th or early 13th century, the monastery consists of several structures in various states of preservation. The main church is a large hall church with rich external decorative stone carvings. The monastery is inscribed on the list of Georgia's Immovable Cultural Monuments of National Significance.

== History ==
Pirghebuli is located on the left bank of the Khrami in the Tetritsqaro Municipality, Kvemo Kartli, in southern Georgia, some 3 km southwest of Samshvilde, the site of a ruined medieval city.

Building inscriptions in the medieval Georgian asomtavruli script, carved on a stone slab in the east façade, mention "the queen of queens Rusudan" and the father superior Demetre. This Rusudan is identified with Queen Queen Rusudan (r. 1222–1245) or Rusudan, aunt of Queen Tamar of Georgia (r. 1184–1213). Prince Vakhushti of Kartli, writing his Description of the Kingdom of Georgia in 1745, also reports that Pirghebuli, "a large building and beautifully appointed", was said to have been built at Tamar's behest. The monastery is mentioned in a handful of historical documents from the 17th and 18th century; otherwise, its recorded history is unknown. In the 18th century, it served as a burial ground to the local noble family of Abashishvili, an offshoot of the Baratashvili. The building was systematically studied and repaired in the 2000s.

== Layout ==
The main church of the Pirghebuli monastery, dedicated to the Mother of God, is built of local basalt stone blocks. It is a hall church design, its north wall leaning against the rock. The church has been remodeled several times. Two chapels annexed to the north can be accessed from the main bay. In the mid-17th century, a narthex and burial vault were added to the south wall by Elise Saginashvili, bishop of Tbilisi, as related in a Georgian inscription above the doorway. The interior was once plastered and frescoed, but only insignificant fragments of the wall paintings survive. The outer walls are adorned by carved stone ornamentation. A nearby located two-storey bell-tower and a separate house for the archimandrite also dates from that period. The complex also includes the ruins of a refectory, farm buildings, a small chapel, and fortified wall, as well as rock-cut cells.
