= Ikvi church =

Church in Shida Kartli, Georgia

Ikvi church of Saint George
- იკვის წმინდა გიორგის ეკლესია
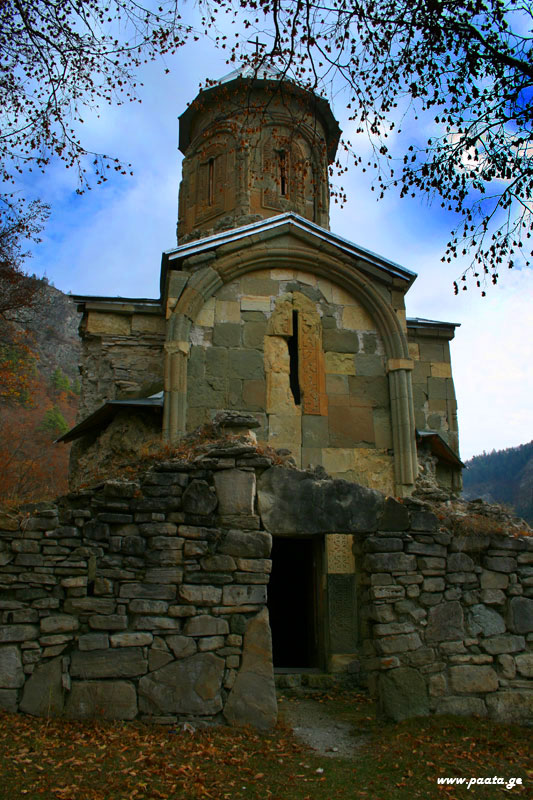
- Ikvi church of Saint George.
- Interactive map of Ikvi church of Saint George
- Location: Chachubeti, Kaspi Municipality; Shida Kartli, Georgia
- Coordinates: 41.819518°N 44.235207°E
- Type: Cross-in-square church

The Ikvi church of Saint George (Georgian: იკვის წმინდა გიორგის ეკლესია, romanized: ik'vis ts'minda giorgis ek'lesia) is a Georgian Orthodox church in the Kaspi Municipality in Georgia's east-central region of Shida Kartli. It is a cross-in-square church dated to the 11th century. The church is known for its elaborate decorative external stone carvings and the 12th–13th-century frescoes, being restored after rainfall damage in 2011. The church is inscribed on the list of Georgia's Immovable Cultural Monuments of National Significance.

== Location ==
The Ikvi church is located in the Tedzami valley, on the Shabtsqala stream, south of the modern village of Chachubeti, in the territory of the now-extinct village of Ikvi. Some 2 km southeast lies another medieval monument, the Rkoni monastery. Literary sources about the construction and history of the church do not exist. The monument was substantially repaired from 1939 to 1940.

== Layout ==
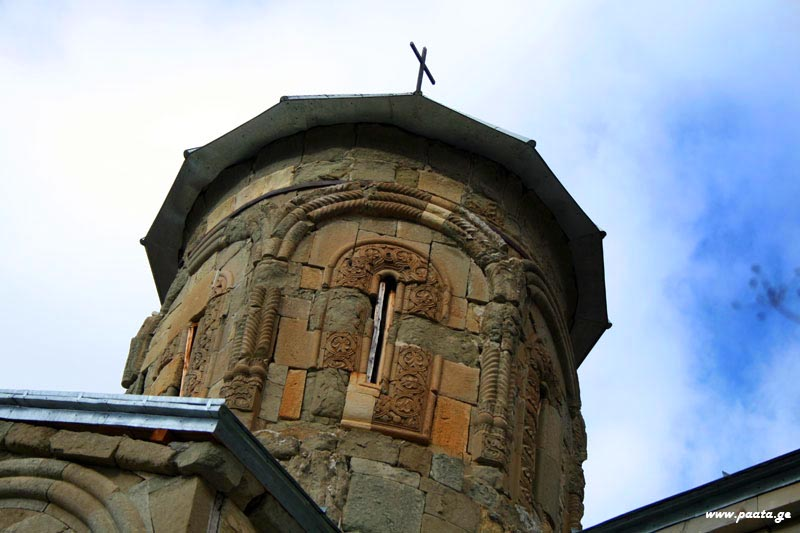
Decorative stone carving on the dome at Ikvi

The Ikvi church of Saint George is built of cut stone blocks and measures 9 × 7.2 m. It is a cross-in-square building, in which the bays that form the four arms of the cross project from the central bay; of these, three are short and rectangular, while the fourth one terminates in a deep apse on the east. The apse is flanked by two pastophoria. The tall dome sits on top of the intersection of vaulted arms of the central bay, its drum resting on a pendentive. The interior is lit by six windows cut in the drum. The drum and façades are adorned with stone carving ornaments, with diverse motifs varied from geometric to complex floral patters. Under the southwest arch, a stone slab bears a cross with blossomed branches cut in relief and an inscription in the medieval Georgian asomtavruli script, paleographically dated to the first half of the 11th century and making mention of a donor, the prelate (mamamtavari) Arsen.

The interior is adorned with frescoes dated to the 12th–13th century. The paintings are known for their artistic quality and iconographic program, which includes portraits of churchmen, Christological scenes, and the episodes of the life and martyrdom of Saint George. The style of the murals indicates that the painter was familiar with Byzantine models, while the cycle of St. George is compositionally similar to the frescoes from another important regional church, Pavnisi. The wall paintings were damaged in heavy rainfall in 2011 and underwent a program of emergency stabilization and conservation in 2012.
