= Javakhaant castle =

Castle in Chqopiani, Kaspi Municipality, Georgia

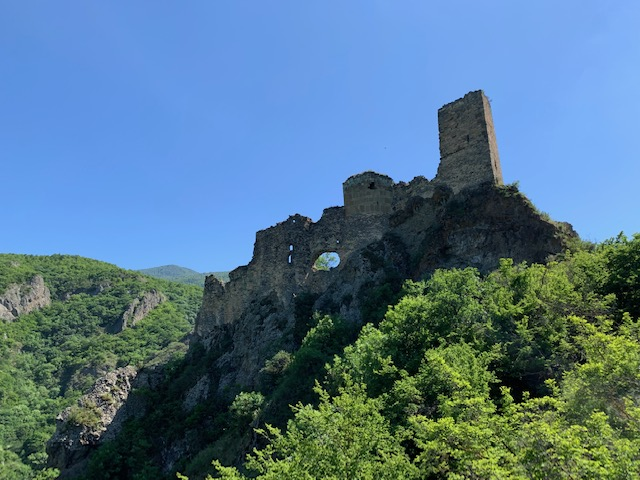
- Drisi Javakhaant castle
- Location: Kaspi Municipality, Shida Kartli, Georgia
- Coordinates: 41°51′58″N 44°17′04″E

The Drisi Javakhaant castle (Georgian: დრისის ჯავახაანთ ციხე, romanized: drisis javakhaant tsikhe) also known as Javakhaant castle is a fortress located on top of a rock, on the left bank of the river Tedzami, 400 meters west of the village of Chqopiani, Kaspi Municipality, Georgia. The complex consists of a castle, a wall, a church, a tower, and a palace.

Since 2006, the fortress is considered a Monument of National Importance by presidential decree.

== Design ==
The complex had a wall with intricate decorations. Builders used rock layers throughout. All the buildings, except for the church, are constructed of sandstone and cobblestones. In the north of the fortress, there is a tower, and to the south, there is a palace, which today is quite ruined. The church is located at the top of the castle and was built with green tuff. The church is named after St. George and its entrance is on the west wall. The complex also houses farm buildings that have been severely damaged.

It is possible to reach the castle from the east by a path through the forest, as well as from the west, although the path is much more difficult. To the east of the castle, within walking distance of the ravine on the opposite side of the hill is a small church with an entrance to the south.

== Literature ==
- Zakaraia P., Georgian Soviet Encyclopedia, vol. 3, p. 639, Tb., 1978.
- Description of Georgian monuments of history and culture, vol. 5 p. 219-220, Tb., 1990.
