= Agara monastery =

Georgian Orthodox monastic complex

Coordinates: 41°31′53″N 43°02′33″E

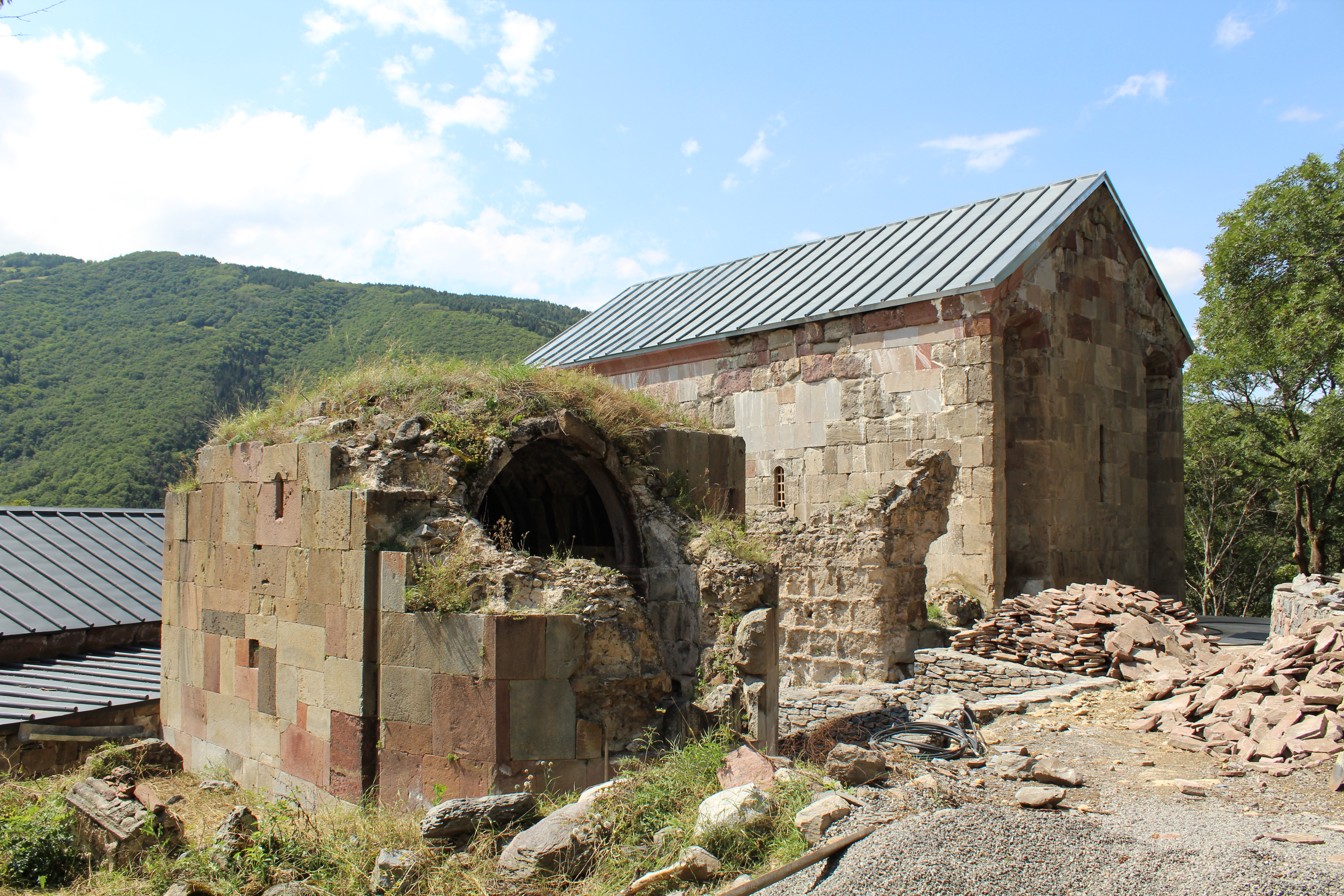

The Agara monastery is a Georgian Orthodox monastic complex located near the village of Uraveli in the municipality of Akhaltsikhe, mkhare of Samtskhe–Javakheti, Georgia.

The Agara complex is multifaceted. The abundance and variety of buildings attest to the fact that there must have been a great monastery. The main church (X-XI) is one of the best and largest individual churches in Georgia. The ruins of a monastery (XI-XII), a bell tower (XIII-XIV), and other monastery buildings (ruins of commercial and residential buildings) are also preserved. Some of them have inscriptions that contain historical references. One of the largest monastery churches in Georgia is located in the Agar complex. The main church was built in the 10th or 11th century and was repaired not before the 14th century.

== Design ==
The complex consists of the main church, the reflector, the bell tower and other ruins. The main church, dated between the 10th - 11th century, is the largest single church nave in Georgia. The refectory, dated between the 11th-12th century, a bell tower of the 13th-14th century and the ruins of other buildings also remain today.
