= Matani, Georgia =

Matani მატანი
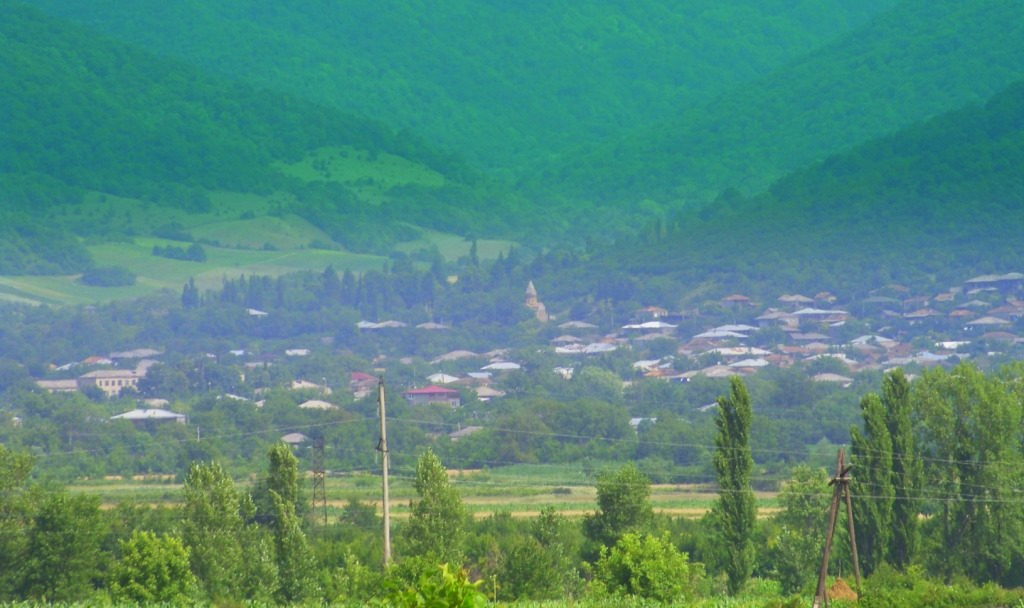
- Village of matani.jpg

- Location in Georgia
- Coordinates: 42°04′39″N 45°11′52″E
- Country: Georgia
- Region: Kakheti
- Municipality: Akhmeta
- Elevation: 570 m (1,870 ft)

Population (2014)
  - Total: 4,451
- Time zone: UTC+4

Matani (Georgian: მატანი) is a village in the Kakheti region, Georgia. In the village is a 5th-century basilica, Tskhrakara (literally, the Nine Gates) and the ruins of an old palace of the Cholokashvili noble family.

The village is also home to several traditional religious festivals throughout a year, particularly Didbatonoba (local celebration of St George's Day, November 23), Iasharoba (autumn), and Tsikhegoroba (local variant of Easter Tuesday holiday).

Matani is also known as the birthplace of the national hero Kakutsa Cholokashvili (1888-1930)

== See also ==
- Kakheti
