= Gagra church =

Church at Gagra in Abkhazia, Georgia

Church of Gagra გაგრის ეკლესია (in Georgian) Гагратәи ауахәама (in Abkhaz)
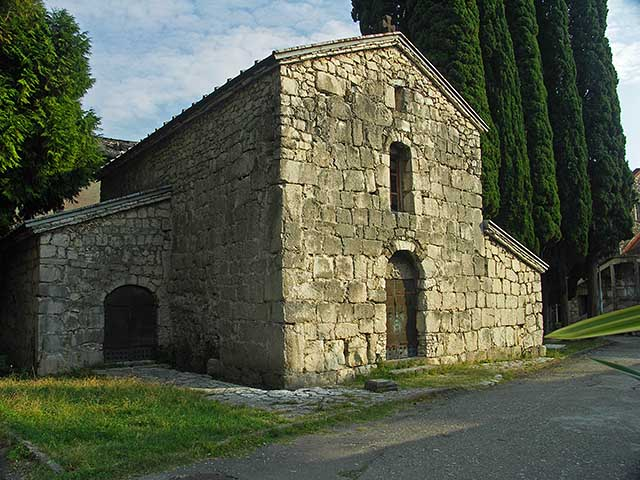
- Church of Gagra

- Location within Abkhazia Location within Georgia

Religion
- Affiliation: Georgian Orthodox
- Province: Abkhazia
- Year consecrated: 6th century
- Status: active

Location
- Location: (Georgia (country)) Gagra, Gagra District, Abkhazia, Georgia
- Municipality: Gagra
- Interactive map of Church of Gagra გაგრის ეკლესია (in Georgian); Гагратәи ауахәама (in Abkhaz)
- Coordinates: 43°19′31″N 40°13′25″E

The Gagra Church (Georgian: გაგრის ეკლესია, romanized: gagris ek'lesia; Abkhaz: Гагратәи ауахәама), also known as Abaata, is an Early Medieval Christian church at Gagra in Abkhazia, Georgia. One of the oldest churches in Abkhazia, it is a simple three-nave basilica built in the 6th century by Anchabadze dynasty. It was reconstructed in 1902.

== History ==
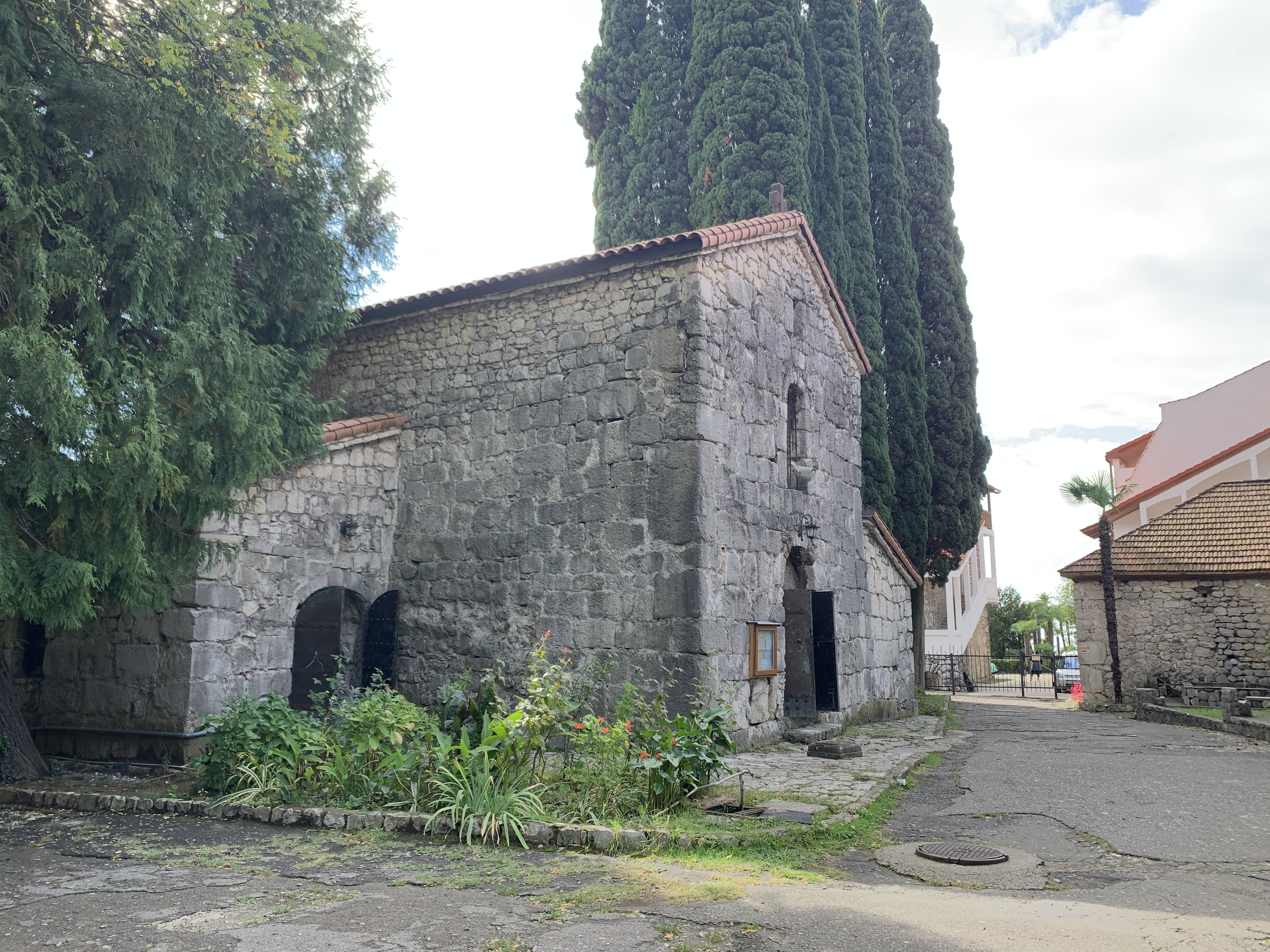

The Gagra church stands in the territory of the contemporaneous fortress known as Abaata, which was also built by Anchabadze dynasty in the 4th-5th AD ruling dynasty in Abkhazia (Georgia) at the time. The fortress is now completely in ruins.

It is built of blocks of rough ashlar stone, the main entrance is from the westerly located narthex. All three naves are connected with each other via doors. The main nave is lit through three windows in the southern wall and with one window, each on the western wall and in the altar. The design of the church is surrounded by “Bolnuri” crosses, which are located on the east door tympanon. The church has many common architectural features with similar basilicas in Eastern Georgia. The church was completely reconstructed in 1902 at the behest of Princess Eugenia Maximilianovna of Leuchtenberg, wife of Duke Alexander Petrovich of Oldenburg, a member of the Russian imperial family, who turned Gagra into a spa town. On 9 January 1903 it was consecrated as the Church of Saint Hypatius. At the same time, the old fortress of Abaata was demolished to pave way to the construction of a hotel. In the Soviet era, the church building was used as a museum of old weaponry. The church underwent some renovation in 2007 and it was restored to Christian use in 2012.

The Gagra church is inscribed on Georgia's list of Monuments of National Significance.
