= Sanagire =

Georgian orthodox monastery in Kakheti, Georgia

Sanagire Monastery

Sanagire (Georgian: სანაგირე) or monastery of Saint George is a Georgian orthodox medieval monastery in the Kakheti region, Georgia. It is located in the Gurjaani Municipality, six kilometers from the town of Vazisubani.

== History ==
The monastery complex consists of a basilica with three naves of the X-XI century and a medieval single-nave basilica. Nearby are the ruins of the monastery building and the enclosure wall. The great basilica is built in carved stone and brick. The monastery is of the tetraconch type and is currently empty, while the church needs urgent rehabilitation.

About a hundred meters northeast of the monastery are the ruins of a smaller church called the Sanagire-Cloverleaf Chapel (Georgian: სანაგირის ტეტრაკონქი). However, only the walls are preserved (approximately 2.5-3 m to the east and south, and even less to the west and north), and the roof is completely collapsed.

== Literature ==
- G. Chubinashvili, Architecture of Kakheti, Tbilisi, 1959, p.123-129 (Russian)
