= Jakismani Monastery =

Medieval monastic Georgian church

Jakismani Monastery of the Resurrection ჯაყისმანის აღდგომის სახელობის მონასტერი
- Jakismani Monastery

- Location within Georgia

Religion
- Affiliation: Georgian Orthodox Church
- Status: Active

Location
- Location: Akhaltsikhe Municipality, Samtskhe-Javakheti, Georgia
- Coordinates: 41.518162°N 42.820829°E

Architecture
- Type: Georgian; Monastery

The Jakismani monastery (Georgian: ჯაყისმანის მონასტერი, jak'ismanis monasteri, also spelled Jaqismani) is a medieval monastic church in Georgia, some 20 kilometres (12 mi) southwest of the town of Vale, Akhaltsikhe Municipality, Samtskhe-Javakheti region. It was repopulated by monks in 2010. The name "Jakismani" is a corruption of the Georgian "Jakisubani" (ჯაყისუბანი), "a district of Jaki".

The Jakismani monastery is located in the historical province of Samtskhe, within the Georgian-Turkish border zone. It is accessible through a poor road only after crossing the Georgian border checkpoint. The monastery consists of a main church, named after Resurrection, two small chapels (one of them possibly a pastophorium, i.e., a chamber to the side of the apse), and a ruined narthex. The main church is a refined hall church design, architecturally dated to the 9th or 10th century and stylistically resembling features of the churches in Javakheti and Tao-Klarjeti. Close to the monastery, in the Potskhovi valley, stand the ruins identified with the medieval Jaki castle, a possession of the Jakeli dynasty. In 2006, the Jakismani monastery was inscribed on the list of the Immovable Cultural Monuments of National Significance of Georgia.
