= Mount Adishi =

Mountain in Georgia

Adishi
- Hadishi
- Location within Caucasus Mountains

Highest point
- Elevation: 4,290 m (14,070 ft)
- Coordinates: 43°1′55.8″N 42°52′0.2″E

Geography
- Location: Svaneti, Georgia
- Country: Georgia
- Parent range: Greater Caucasus

Mount Adishi (Georgian: ადიში) also known as Hadishi, is a peak in the central part of the Greater Caucasus Mountain Range. The elevation of the mountain is 4,290 m (14,070 ft) above sea level. The mountain is made up of paleozoic granites. The slopes of Adishi are covered by glaciers.

== See also ==
- Adishi Glacier
