= Tabakini Monastery =

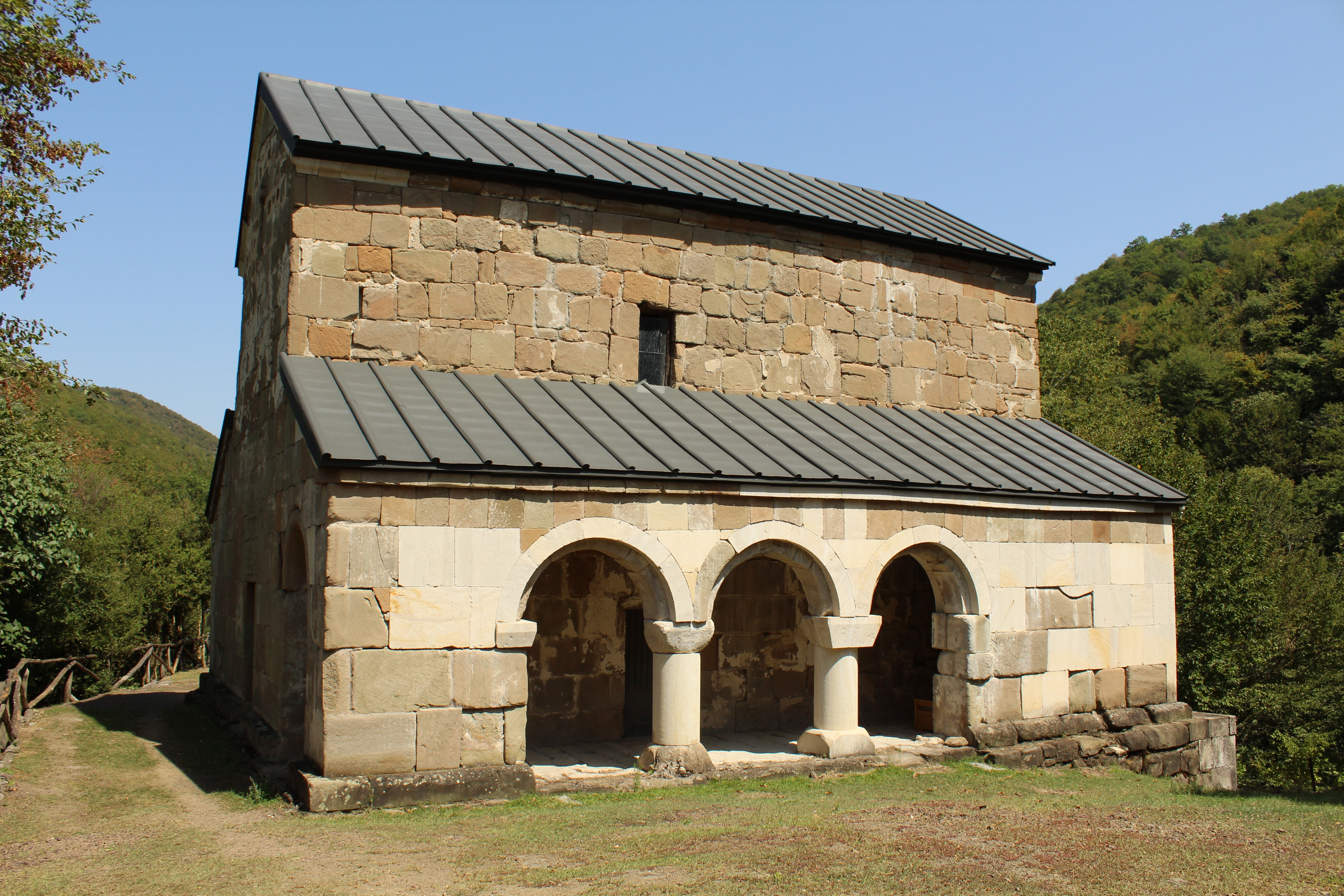

The Tabakini Monastery of St. George (Georgian: ტაბაკინის წმინდა გიორგის მონასტერი, romanized: t'abak'inis ts'minda giorgis monast'eri) is a monastery located in western Georgia, in the upper part of Imereti, 7–8 kilometers from the city of Zestaponi.

== History ==
The construction of the monastery has been dated between the seventh and eighth centuries. Tabakini is known for its special architecture, rich history and 16th-century murals. The monastery, which housed up to 70 monks at its peak, made a great contribution to the country's history. Here, an outstanding ascetic of the 19th century, Hilarion Kartveli, spent part of his childhood. Under the communist regime, the monastery was ransacked and destroyed.

The old part consists of a church with two naves, a crypt, and a side chapel, built in the seventh and eighth centuries. The church was painted during the first half of the 16th century and has a bell tower from a later period. The monastery retains the image of King Bagrat III of Imereti (1510–1565).

In 1980–1986, the temple was restored. In the 1990s, a house for monks was built.

== Literature ==
- Georgian Soviet Encyclopedia, Vol. 9, p. 633, Tb., 1985.
