= Didachara mosque =

Wooden mosque in Adjara, Georgia

Didachara Mosque
- დიდაჭარის ჯამე
- Location within Adjara Location within Georgia

Religion
- Affiliation: Islam

Location
- Location: Satsikhuri, Khulo Municipality, Adjara, Georgia
- Interactive map of Didachara Mosque
- Coordinates: 41°41′15″N 42°23′17″E

Architecture
- Type: Mosque
- Completed: 1831–1832

The Didachara mosque (Georgian: დიდაჭარის ჯამე, romanized: didach'aris jame) is a wooden mosque located at the village of Satsikhuri, Khulo Municipality, in the autonomous republic of Adjara, Georgia.

== History ==
Didachara mosque was originally established in the town of Didachara and has been dated between the end of the 18th century and the beginning of the 19th century. During the Russo-Turkish War, the first mosque building was set on fire by General Dmitri Osten-Sacken. A second mosque was built in 1814, destined for the villages of the upper part of the Acharistsqali valley. However, it was soon dissolved and divided into three villages, Paksadzes, Baghleti and, Didachara. After building a new mosque, the old one was transferred to the town of Satsikhuri, located at the top of the same valley.

Didachara was significantly renovated but retains its old look. It stands out for its more than 200 years and for its unique decorations. Particularly notable are the presses on the door. Didachari is made of wood.

The mosque received the category of Cultural Monument of National Importance on November 7, 2006.
