= Chontio =

Historical village located in Georgia

Chontio (Georgian: ჭონთიო) is a historical village at the Akhmeta District, in Kakheti, part of the historical region of Tusheti, about 50 kilometers from the town of Omalo, Georgia.

== Location ==
The village is located in the territory of Tusheti National Park.

In the village, there is a castle and a tower. The tower is located on the north side of Chontio, is five stories high, narrows upwards (measures 5.6 x 5.3 m on the ground floor) and dates from the late Middle Ages, while the castle is located on the outskirts from the village and belongs to the 18th century. The building has five floors. The walls of the second and third floors of the castle are full of internal defects. The monument is currently damaged: the upper parts of the walls of the fifth floor have yielded and the floor covering overlaps, most of the building has collapsed.
