= Diklo, Georgia =

Diklo დიკლო
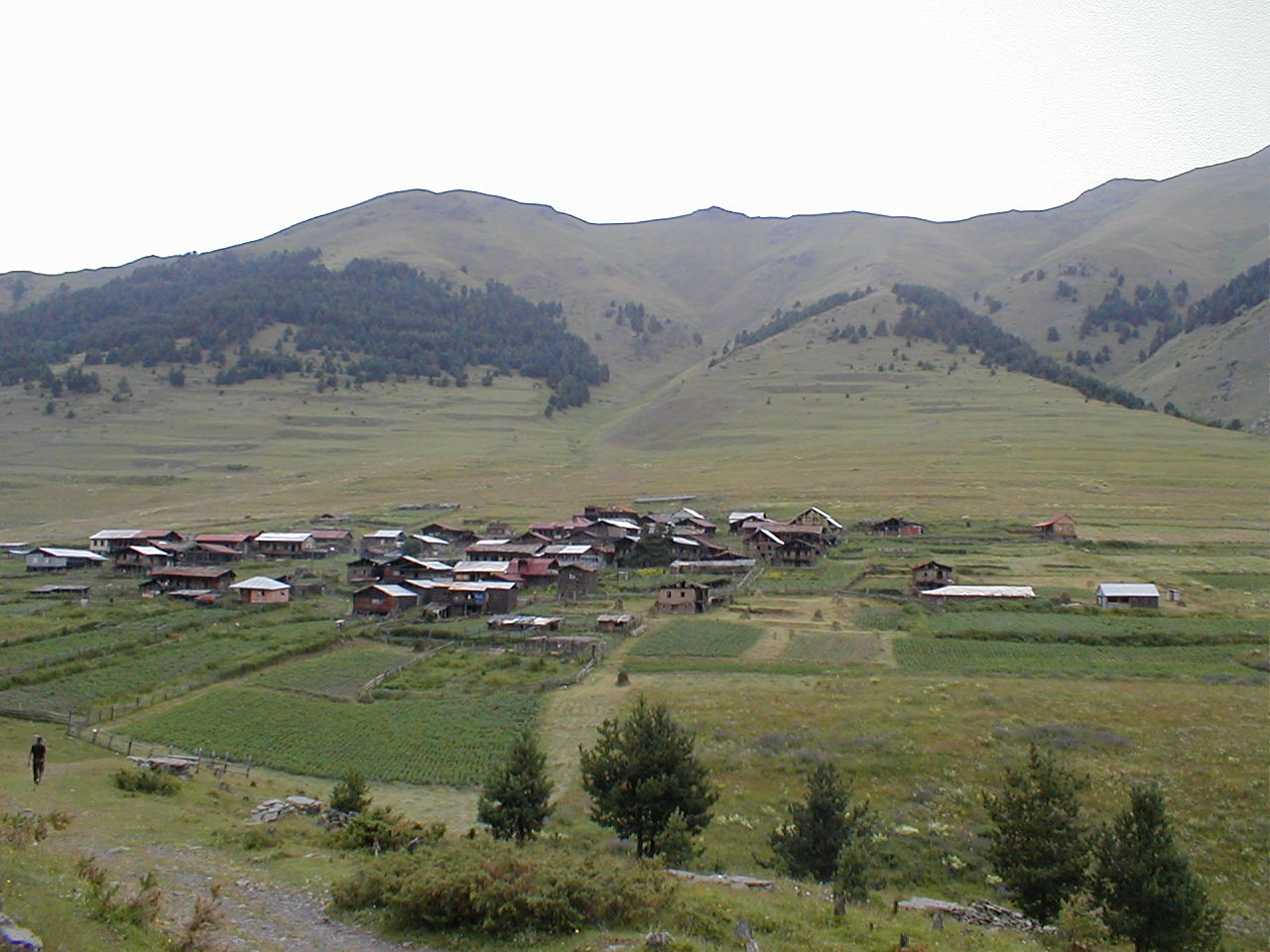

- Location within Georgia
- Coordinates: 42°23′48″N 45°41′18″E
- Country: Georgia
- Mkhare: Kakheti
- Municipality: Akhmeta
- Elevation: 2,140 m (7,020 ft)

Population (2014)
  - Total: 0
- Time zone: UTC+4 (Georgian Time)

Diklo (Georgian: დიკლო) is a village in the historical region of Tusheti, Georgia. Administratively, it is part of the Akhmeta Municipality in Kakheti. It lies between the Greater Caucasus Mountain Range and the Pirikita Range of Tusheti.

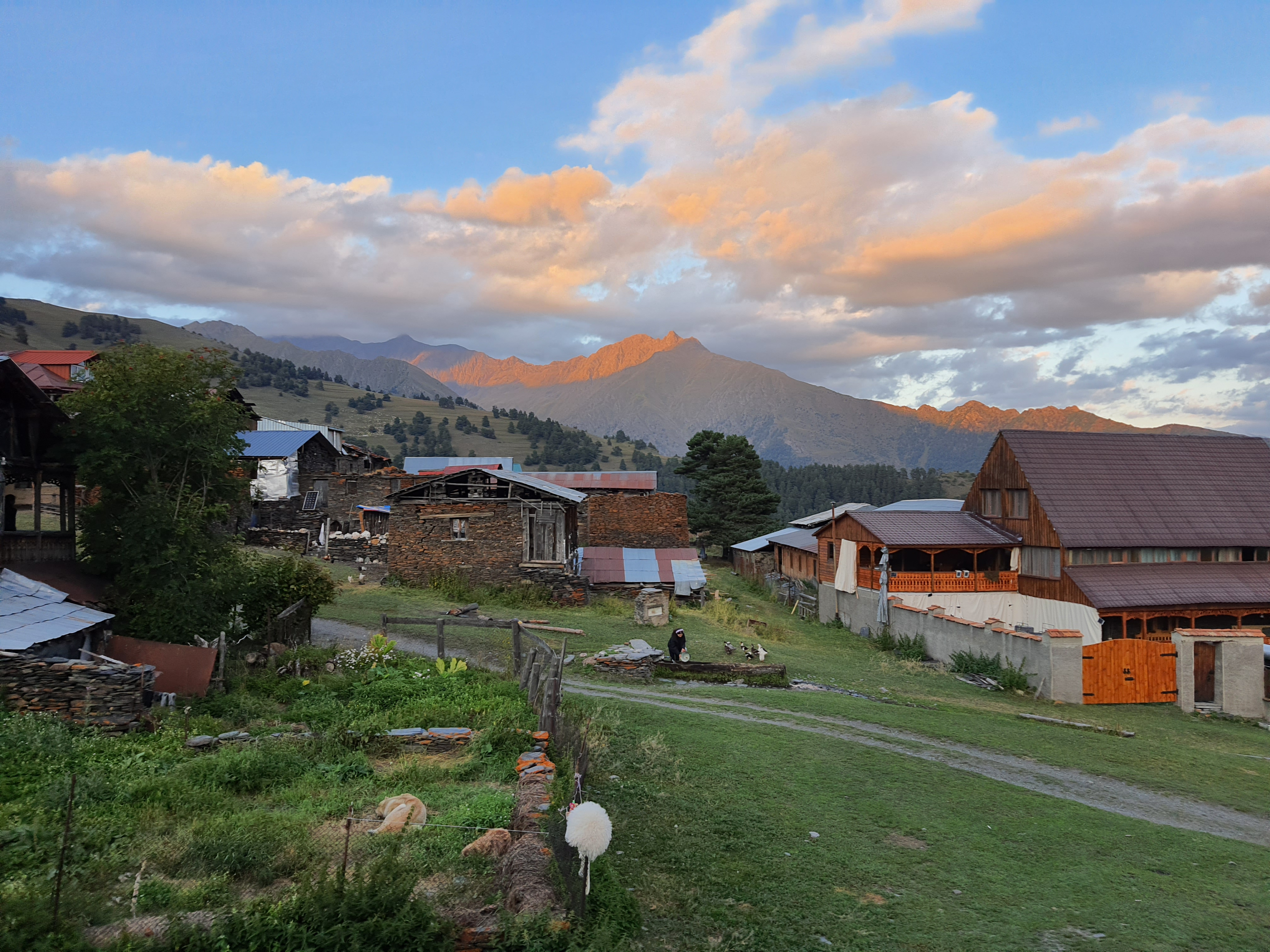
A late summer evening scene at the village.

== See also ==
- Kakheti

== Sources ==
- Georgian Soviet Encyclopedia, V. 3, p. 551, Tbilisi, 1978 year.
