= Chabukauri basilica =

- ჭაბუკაურის ბაზილიკა
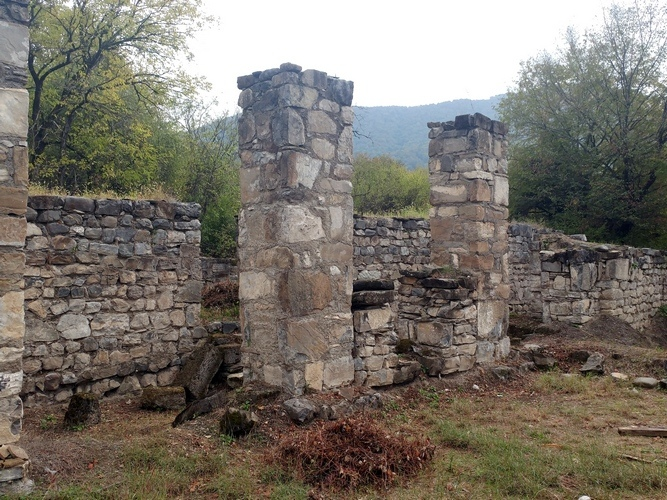
- Chabukauri basilica. Two ruined columns on the northeast.
- Interactive map of Chabukauri basilica
- Location: Qvareli Municipality, Kakheti, Georgia
- Coordinates: 41.977550°N 45.756810°E
- Type: Three-church basilica

Chabukauri basilica (Georgian: ჭაბუკაურის ბაზილიკა, romanized: ch'abuk'auris bazilik'a) is an early Christian church—now in a ruinous state—in the eastern Georgian region of Kakheti, in the territory of the historical settlement of Nekresi, about 1.5 km northwest of the Nekresi monastic complex. It is a large three-aisle basilica, dated to the 4th to 5th century, making it one of the earliest Christian church buildings in Georgia. It was unearthed in 1998. The basilica is inscribed on the list of the Immovable Cultural Monuments of National Significance of Georgia.

== History ==
The Chabukauri basilica was unearthed in an eponymous plot in 1998 and was dated, on architectural and archaeological grounds, to the 4th or 5th century. Being one of the largest basilican churches in Georgia, its discovery questioned a previous assumption that the first church buildings in eastern Georgia were typically small narrow edifices autonomously developed in the country. Another huge basilica, the Dolochopi church, was uncovered just 4 km east as the crow flies, in 2012. Both temples appear to have been part of the larger settlement of Nekresi, but due to the lack of written sources and dense foliage covering the area its extent remains unknown. These Christian establishments were founded not long after as a nearby located Zoroastrian shrine, the so-called Nekresi fire temple, was abandoned. Nodar Bakhtadze, who excavated Chabukauri, identifies the basilica with a church known from the early medieval Georgian chronicles to have been founded at Nekresi by King Trdat of Kartli (r. c. 394 – 406). The church's design is in line with the established Eastern Roman standards, but the architectural details such as a quadrangular sanctuary and parabemata show affinities with the early churches in Sasanian Iran, such as Hira, Ain Shaia, and Kharg, all dated to the late 4th century.

== Layout ==
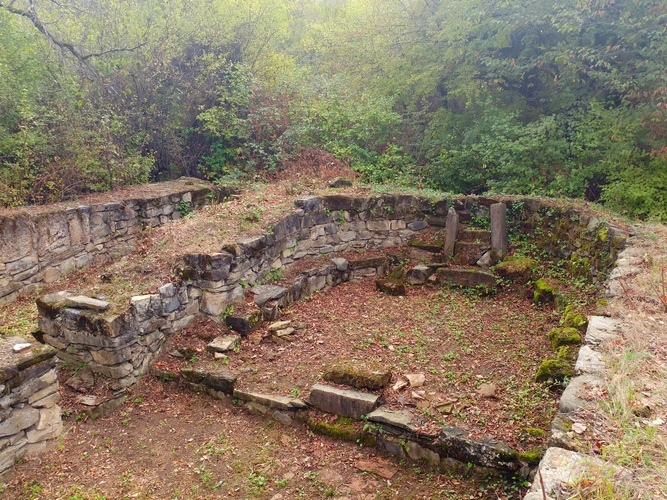
Altar niche in the Chabukauri basilica.

Chabukauri is a three-nave basilica, measuring 33.4 x 15 m. It was built of large limestone blocks, sledged stones, and gravel. The naos is divided into three naves by five pairs of rectangular-shaped pillars. A rectangular altar seems to have been placed in the southeast of the main nave. It was flanked, on either side, by small rectangular chambers, corresponding to the pastophoria. The building had three entrances, on the south, west, and north. The main nave appears to have been damaged in an earthquake not long after the church's construction and part of its northeastern sector was converted into the south aisle of a new, smaller building. This new church terminated in two distinctive horseshoe-shaped apses, the larger of which had a synthronon. The church had a wooden roof with ceramic tiles, held in place with nails and antefixes. A number of medieval cist burials have been unearthed across the site. Within the church ruins, many fragments of pottery and two unique bronze oil lamps have been found. To the northwest of the basilica there is a small apsed structure of unknown function, which was covered by a high-quality terracotta tile floor. There is an indication that the walls of the building were once plastered and painted red.
