= Dolochopi basilica =

- დოლოჭოპის ბაზილიკა
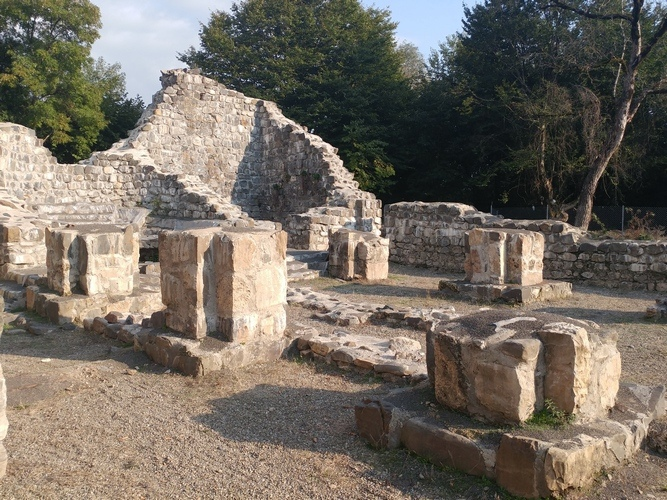
- Ruins of Dolochopi
- Interactive map of Dolochopi basilica
- Location: Qvareli Municipality, Kakheti, Georgia
- Coordinates: 41.973568°N 45.810356°E
- Type: Three-church basilica

Dolochopi basilica (Georgian: დოლოჭოპის ბაზილიკა, romanized: doloch'op'is bazilik'a) is an early Christian church—now in a ruinous state—in the eastern Georgian region of Kakheti, in the territory of the historical settlement of Nekresi. It is a large 5th-century triple basilica, built over an earlier ruined church, which is carbon dated to AD 387, making it one of the earliest known Christian sites in Georgia. It was unearthed in 2012. The basilica is inscribed on the list of the Immovable Cultural Monuments of National Significance of Georgia.

== Location ==
The Dolochopi basilica—so named after a long-abandoned village—stands in ruins at the northwest outskirts of the town of Qvareli, on the right bank of the Duruji river. Some 3.5 km west as the crow flies is the Nekresi monastery, and further 1 km west, lies the archaeological site of Chabukauri, boasting ruins of a large early Christian basilica, which shares many features with that of Dolochopi.

The ruins at Dolochopi were located in archaeological reconnaissance in 2010 and excavated by an expedition of the Georgian National Museum led by Nodar Bakhtadze between 2012 and 2015. It proved to be a substantial church which stood in the centre of what was once a flourishing settlement of Late Antiquity. The settlement, unknown from written sources, had declined steadily after a series of earthquakes and foreign invasions, falling into oblivion and being reclaimed by nature by the Late Middle Ages. Due to dense foliage, the extent of this settlement is unknown.

== Layout ==
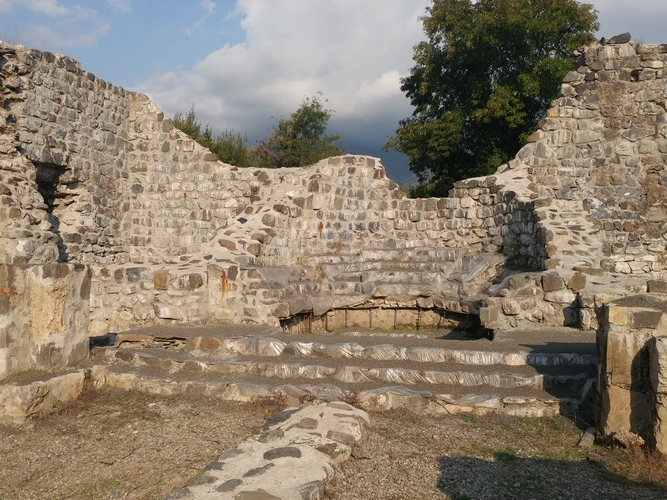
Dolochopi basilica. Sanctuary apse and synthronon.

The church was built of rubble and gravel. It was a large triple basilica, measuring 36 x 18.5 metres in its central three–nave section, but had further aisles added to both north and south, bringing the edifice to the total size of 44 x 27 metres. This made Dolochopi the largest basilica known in Georgia and one of the largest in the Caucasus and neighboring regions of Eastern Christendom. The division of the naos into three naves was effected by five pairs of cruciform columns. The central nave terminated in a horseshoe-shaped sanctuary apse on the east. The apse was furnished with a four-stepped synthronon—a bench reserved for the clergy—a feature unattested elsewhere in Georgia except at Chabukauri. Beneath it, in the centre of the apse, was a large tomb compartment. Before the altar there was a spacious bema with a soleas. The easternmost portion of the gallery was occupied by a baptistery. The church was covered by a wooden roof with terracotta tiles, held in place with iron nails and antefixes.

The basilica is dated, on architectural and archaeological grounds, to the middle of the 5th century. It is built over an earlier church, 25 metres in length and about 15 metres in width. A sample obtained from this earliest layer is carbon dated to AD 387. It was probably destroyed in an earthquake at the same time as the church at Chabukauri. The superimposed 5th-century basilica was also damaged in a later earthquake. The nave and the church's immediate premises continued to be used as a burial ground. The northeastern corner of the church was adapted in the 8th or 9th century as a mortuary chapel which remained functional until at least the 12th–13th century.

The discoveries at Chabukauri and Dolochopi challenged a previous assumption that the first church buildings in eastern Georgia were typically small narrow edifices built to accommodate a limited number of people. Architecturally, the Dolochopi church was a local precursor to a triple basilica design, peculiar for Georgia. Aspects of overall design of the church and roofing as well the lighting fixtures uncovered at the site are typical Eastern Roman features, while some details of layout of the apse and numismatic finds at the site point to Sasanian influences.
