= Akhalsopeli (municipality of Kvareli) =

Akhalsopeli ახალსოფელი
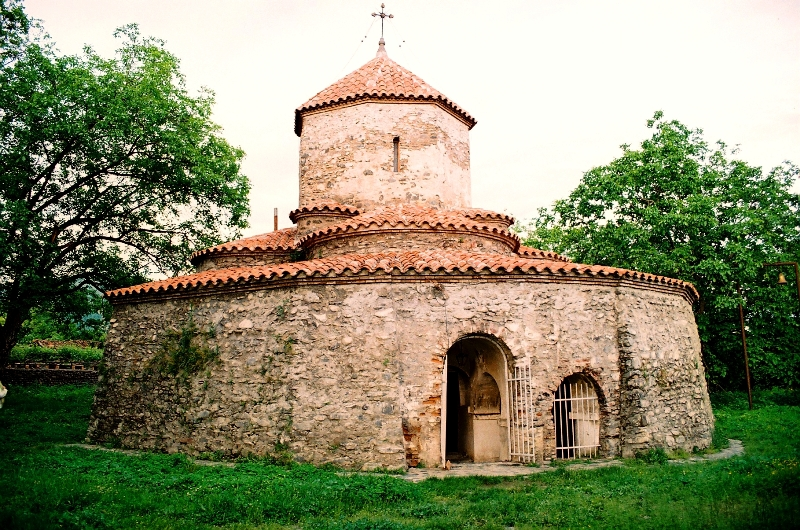
- Church of the Virgin Dzveli Gavazi

- Location in Georgia
- Coordinates: 41°54′17″N 45°58′37″E
- Country: Georgia
- Region: Kakheti
- Municipality: Qvareli Municipality
- Elevation: 440 m (1,440 ft)

Population (2014)
  - Total: 4,158
  - Summer (DST): UTC4
- Area code: +995

Akhalsopeli (Georgian: ახალსოფელი; Ex. Dzveli Gavazi) is a village in the municipality of Kvareli in Kakheti, in the Republic of Georgia. As of 2014, the village had a population of 4158 people.

== Geography ==
Akhalsopeli lies in the Alazani river valley at the foot of the Greater Caucasus mountains, immediately to the east of the Georgian capital of Tbilisi between the Shorokhevi and Avaniskhevi rivers. The rivers flow down from the mountains to the north which separate the village from the Muskaki Pass on the Russian border. The volost contains the villages of Balgodzhiani, Tivi, Tkhilistskaro, Shorokhi, and Satskhene. The village of Mughanlo lies to the east.

== Landmarks ==
The village contains the Akhalsopeli Cultural Centre and Dzveli Gavazi church. Zinobiani Winery lies just to the southwest of the village at Zinobiani. The Marikopis Canal stems across to the west of the village to the village of Marikopi.
