= Nekresi fire temple =

- ნეკრესის ცეცხლის ტაძარი
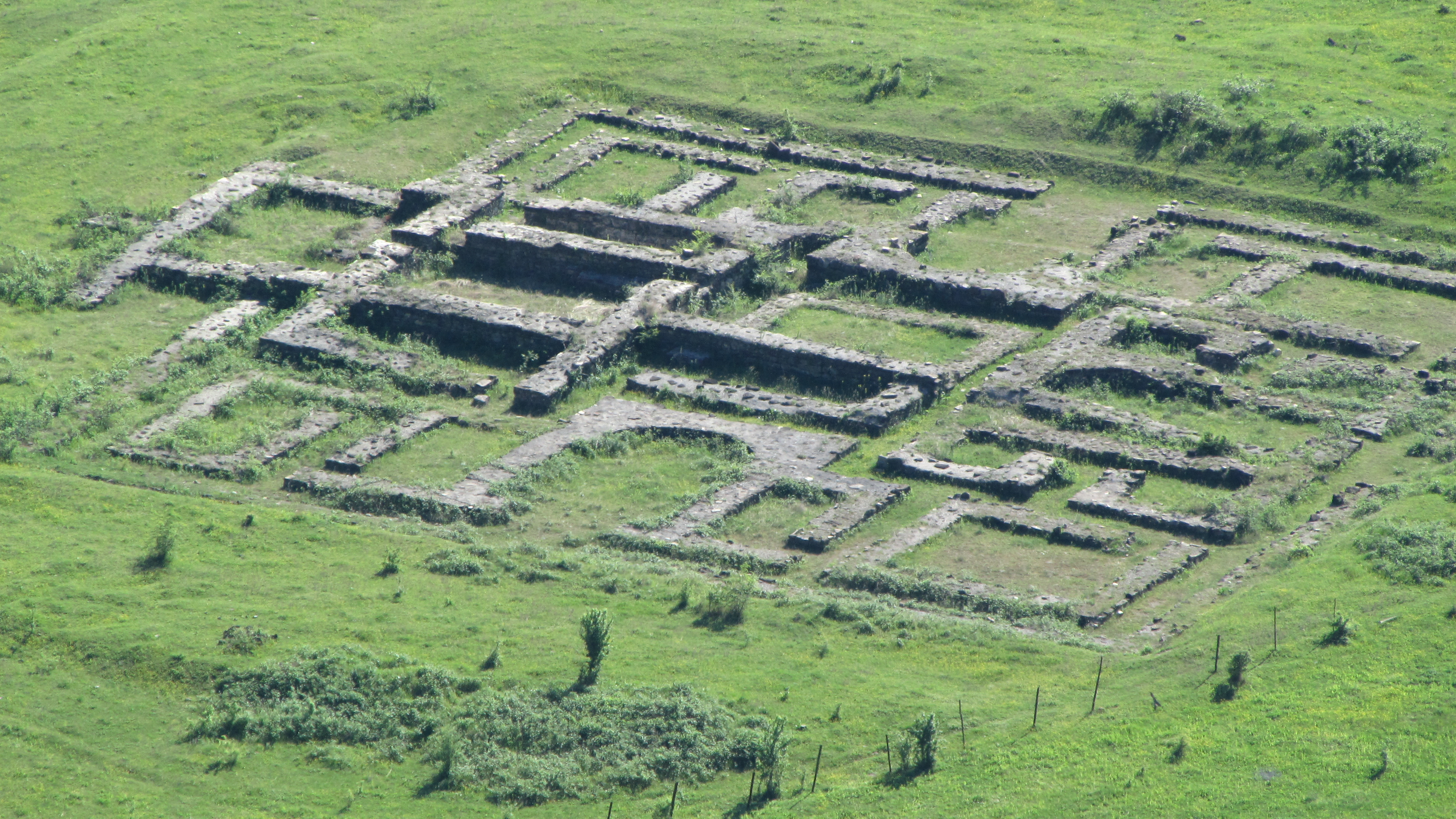
- Ruins of the fire temple as seen from the Nekresi monastery
- Interactive map of Nekresi fire temple
- Location: Qvareli Municipality, Kakheti, Georgia
- Coordinates: 41.967379°N 45.761017°E
- Type: Pre-Christian shrine

The Nekresi fire temple (Georgian: ნეკრესის ცეცხლის ტაძარი, romanized: nek'resis tsetskhlis t'adzari) is an archaeological complex in the eastern Georgian region of Kakheti, part of the wider Nekresi site. The excavated building, preserved only fragmentarily at a foundation level, is identified as a Zoroastrian fire temple, sun temple, or a Manichean shrine. Constructed in the 2nd or 3rd century, the complex was destroyed in the 5th. The site is inscribed on the list of the Immovable Cultural Monuments of National Significance of Georgia.

== History ==
The Nekresi temple lies in lowland arable fields to the south of the hill on which the early medieval Nekresi monastery stands. It was unearthed by an archaeological expedition from the Georgian National Museum working at Nekresi between 1984 and 1993 and identified by its excavator, Levan Chilashvili, as a Zoroastrian fire-temple. In 2004, another team suggested that the temple was aligned with the summer and winter solstices and it might have incorporated elements of solar worship. Alternatively, Guram Kipiani argues that the spatial organization of the building is not compatible with that of a fire-temple and theorizes that the complex was in fact a Manichean shrine. Archaeological artifacts found at the site are limited to fragments of pottery of the 2nd to the 4th centuries; charcoal from a threshold gave a radiocarbon date in the 5th century suggesting that the site was destroyed at that time.

== Layout ==
Two construction phases are identified in the complex; the lower horizon is a ground floor and foundation of a cult building, dated to the period of the 2nd–4th century, which seems to have been deliberately demolished and parts of its building materials reused for the construction of a castle or fortified palace. Both layers are built of large rubble with lime mortar with the additional use of flat bricks in the upper layer.

The temple is set in a square plan, measuring 50 x 50 metres in total. Its design is complex, centered on an almost square building of 76 m^{2}, around which there were four more buildings arranged in a cruciform pattern and each ending in a semicircular apse facing the central building. In the southwestern corner of the central building was a nearly square area made of clay, measuring 4.5 m^{2} and containing traces of fire, leading to the conclusion that the edifice was a fire-temple. All five buildings together with their associated corridors and accessory chambers were enclosed by a wall. Access to any of the rooms in the complex was possible through doors cut in the external corridors.
