= Dzveli Gavazi church =

Dzveli Gavazi
- ძველი გავაზი
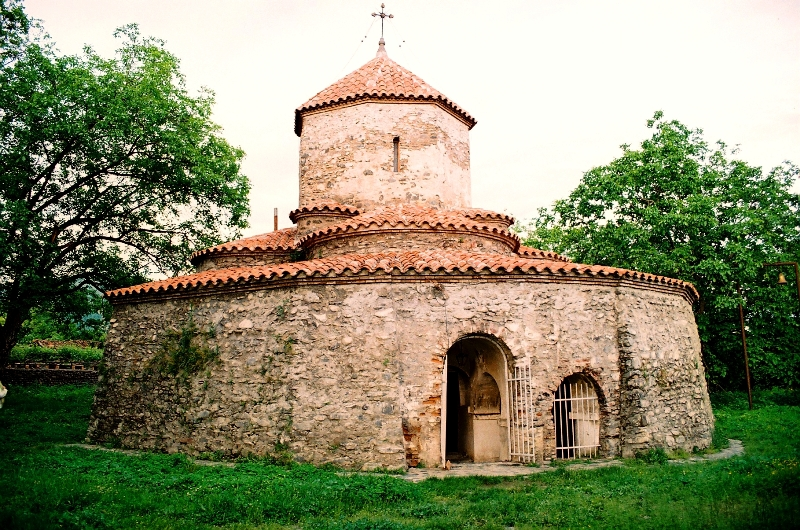
- Dzveli Gavazi
- Interactive map of Dzveli Gavazi
- Location: Akhalsopeli, Qvareli Municipality, Kakheti, Georgia
- Coordinates: 41.913008°N 45.980176°E
- Type: Tetraconch church

The Dzveli Gavazi church of the Mother of God (Georgian: ძველი გავაზის ღვთისმშობლის ეკლესია, romanized: dzveli gavazis ghvtismshoblis ek'lesia) is an early medieval Christian church in the eastern Georgian region of Kakheti. It is a tetraconch with the dome positioned over the centre of the square. Exactly when Dzveli Gavazi was built is not known. The church is dated on typological grounds to the 6th century, but it was reworked with the addition of an ambulatory at a later date, probably in the 9th century, and substantially repaired in 1852. The church is inscribed on the list of the Immovable Cultural Monuments of National Significance of Georgia.

== History ==
The Dzveli Gavazi church is located at the village of Akhalsopeli in the Qvareli Municipality, at the foot of the Greater Caucasus. Its name, meaning "old Gavazi", reflects the fact that the villagers—plagued by marauding raids from neighboring Dagestan—abandoned their homes in the early 18th century and moved to the banks of the Alazani where they founded Akhali Gavazi, "new Gavazi". Under the Russian rule, Prince Ivane Amilkhvari, aide-de-camp to the viceroy Mikhail Vorontsov, engineered resettlement of the abandoned village—naming it Akhalsopeli, "a new village"—in 1850 and had the old church restored two years later, an event commemorated in a text inscribed on a red stone slab, mounted above the south doorway in the ambulatory. In 1971, an archaeological expedition from the Georgian National Museum unearthed 35 burials in the churchyard, with artifacts dating from the 10th century into the 18th.

== Layout ==
The Dzveli Gavazi church is a tetraconch, its four semicircular apses, with conchs, projecting each from one side of a square. Wrapping around three-quarters of the tetraconch is an ambulatory, which terminates at the north apse. The edifice is topped by the centrally located dome which is based on an octagonal drum, pierced by three windows, one each on the east, south, and west. Transition from the square to the circle of the dome is effected through pendentives, which spring from four semicircular rubble-built columns without the intervening unifying element of a capital. Dzveli Gavazi has an analogue in Kakheti, the similarly quatrefoil church at Ninotsminda; the region was otherwise dominated in the early Middle Ages by the "three-church basilica" type, that is, a basilica with two separate apsed side-aisles to the north and south of the central nave.
