= Nekresi =

- ნეკრესი (Georgian)
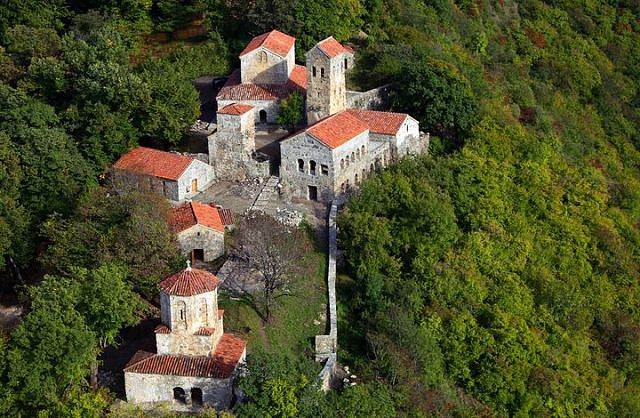
- Aerial view of the Nekresi monastery

- Location within Georgia
- 41°58′19.11″N 45°46′3.99″E
- Location: Qvareli Municipality, Kakheti, Georgia

Nekresi (Georgian: ნეკრესი) is a historic and archaeological site in eastern Georgian region of Kakheti, between the town of Qvareli and the village of Shilda, at the foothills of the Greater Caucasus mountains. It is home to the still-functioning Nekresi monastery, founded in the 6th century.

Nekresi is known from the early medieval Georgian sources as a once flourishing town of antiquity. A series of archaeological expeditions, beginning in 1984, have uncovered various features of a large settlement, but its extent remains unknown because of a densely forested landscape and lack of written sources. Several major structures, unearthed across the site and mostly dated to Late Antiquity, bear traces of earthquakes and violent destruction. Nekresi was reduced to a village or a number of hamlets in the 8th century. Its principal monastery remained functional, but the town itself became engulfed in foliage and gradually disappeared from historical memory until its rediscovery by modern archaeology.

Some of the most important archaeological discoveries include the Nagebebi winery, a Zoroastrian fire temple, and the early Christian basilicas of Chabukauri and Dolochopi.

== History ==
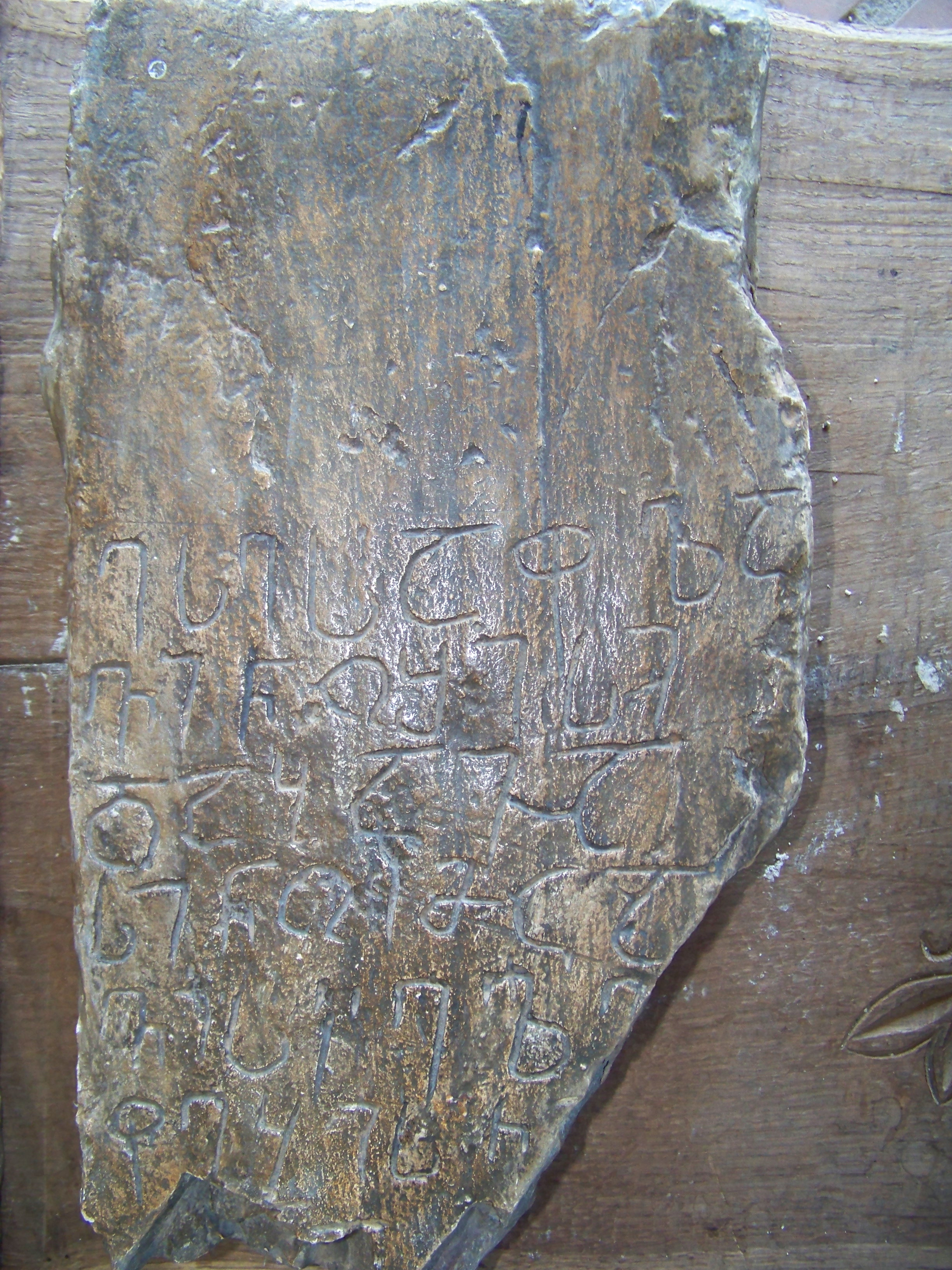
Nekresi Inscriptions

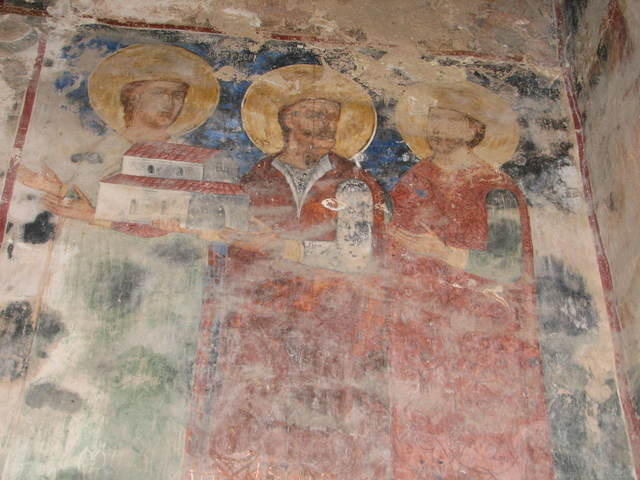
King Leon of Kakheti, flanked by his wife Tinatin and son Alexander, on a 16th-century fresco from the Nekresi church of the Dormition.

Nekresi—sometimes referred to as Nekrisi, and unusually, Nelkarisi or Nelkari—appears in the early medieval Georgian chronicles as a royal project in Kakheti, in the far east of Kartli, which was known to the Classical authors as Iberia. The founding of a city at Nekresi is ascribed to Parnajom, the fourth in a traditional list of the kings of Kartli (r. 109 – 90 BC, according to Cyril Toumanoff's chronology). The ninth king, Arshak (r. 90–78 BC), is reported to have embellished it and Mirvanoz, a tutor of the boy-king Mirian (r. 284–361)—eventually the first Christian monarch of Kartli—is said to have strengthened the city’s walls. Still later, King Trdat (r. 394–406) is credited with founding a Christian church at Nekresi and Dachi, son of King Vakhtang I (r. 447–522), appears to have had Nekresi, together with Cheremi, in an appanage.

In the 6th century, a hill at Nekresi became home to a Christian monastic foundation, associated in the medieval Georgian literary tradition with Abibos, one of the Thirteen Assyrian Fathers, a group of ascetics who popularized monasticism throughout the eastern Georgian domains. Abibos proselytised among the mountaineers of the Aragvi valley and antagonized Zoroastrians, eventually being put to death by them.

Nekresi's history as a major urban and religious center in the Late Antiquity was corroborated by a series of archaeological studies between 1984 and 2017. Ruins of two large early Christian basilicas were uncovered at the wooded plots of Dolochopi and Chabukauri, some four kilometers apart, the former carbon dated to 387 and the latter identified by its excavator, Nodar Bakhtadze, with King Trdat's church. Midway between these sites, at the foot of the hill on which the Nekresi monastery stands, a Zoroastrian fire temple was unearthed. Due to the lack of written sources and the dense foliage that covers the area, the extent of these settlements of Nekresi is unknown. After a series of earthquakes and foreign invasions, especially those by the Arabs in the 8th century, the town went in steady decline. Nekresi was reduced to a rural settlement or group of villages, while the once flourishing town fell into oblivion and was largely reclaimed by nature by the Late Middle Ages.

The hilltop monastery at Nekresi continued to function and also acted as the seat of a local bishop, entitled as Nekreseli. The establishment saw its defensive structures fortified during the relatively stable reigns of successive kings of Kakheti, Leon (r. 1518–1574) and Alexander II (r. 1574–1605). Subsequent turmoils and incessant marauding raids from the neighboring tribes of Dagestan compelled the bishop to transfer his see from the monastery to the relative security of the church of the Mother of God in the nearby village of Shilda in 1785. Shortly after the Imperial Russian takeover of the Georgian church in 1811, the diocese of Nekresi was abolished, followed by the dissolution of the convent itself. Both were restored in modern Georgia after the fall of the Soviet Union: the former bishopric was reconstituted as the Eparchy of Nekresi within the Georgian Orthodox Church in 1995 and the monastery became repopulated by monks in 2000.

== Monuments ==
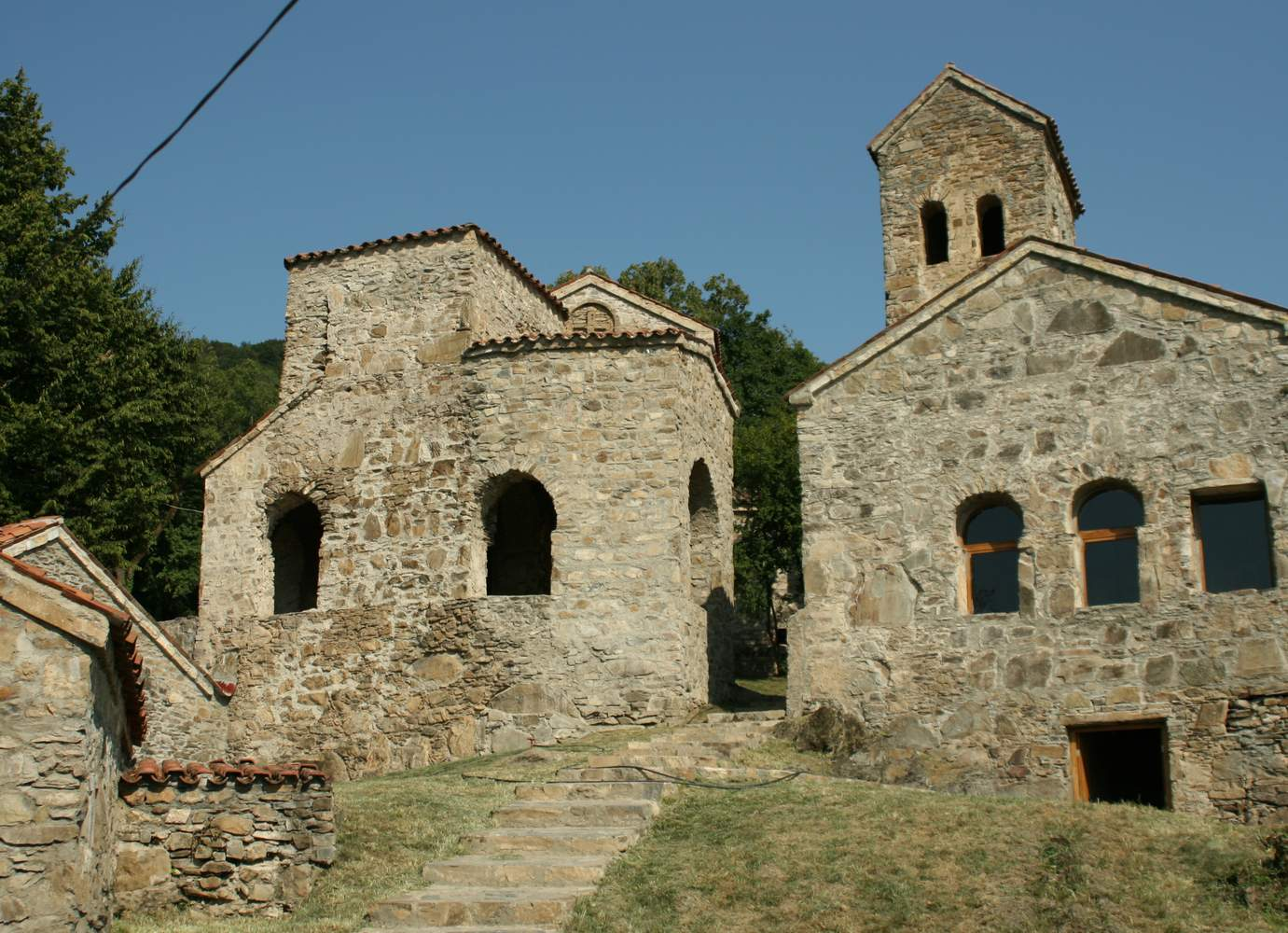
Nekresi monastery: mortuary chapel, episcopal palace, refectory, and tower

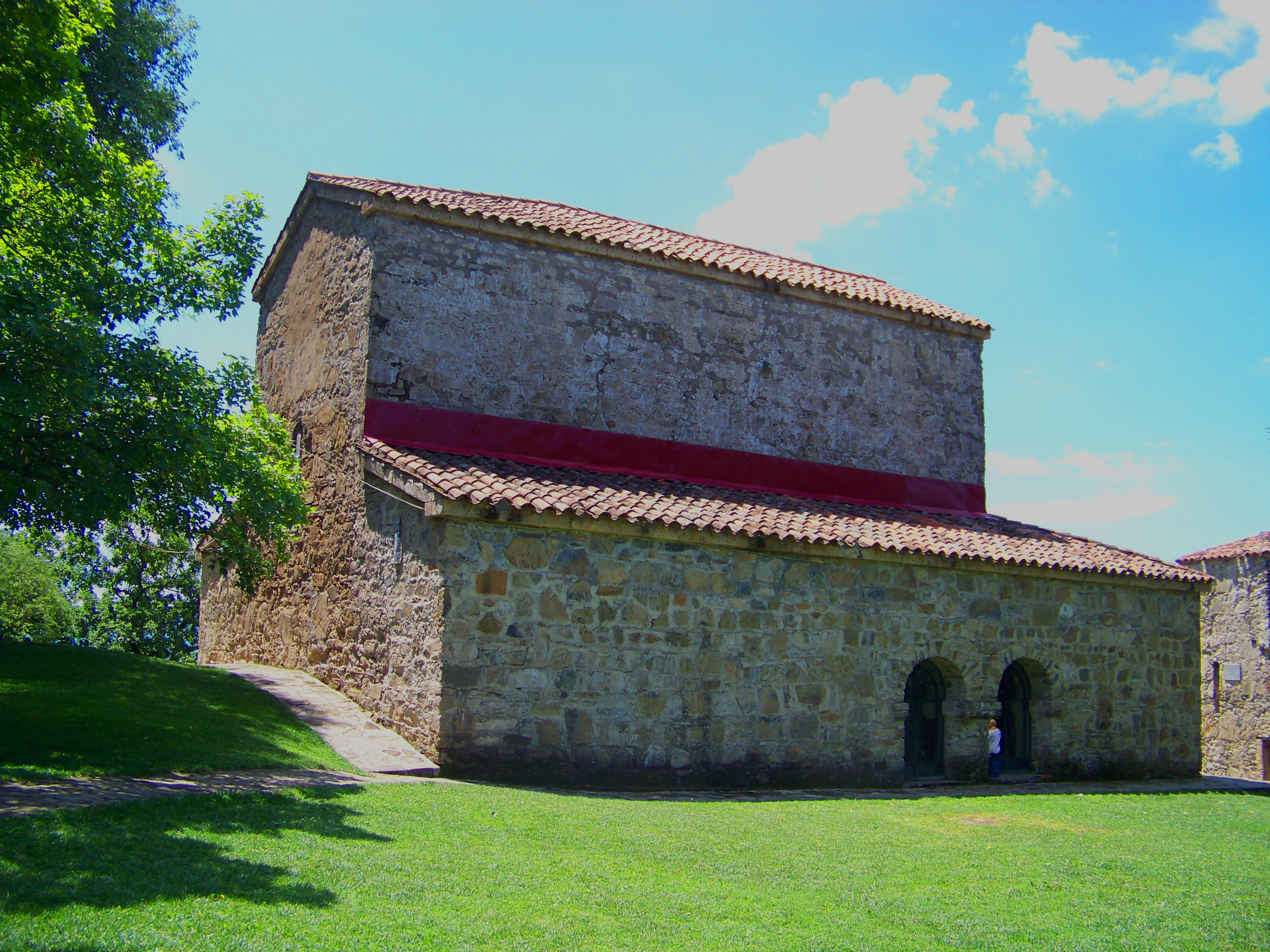
Church of the Dormition

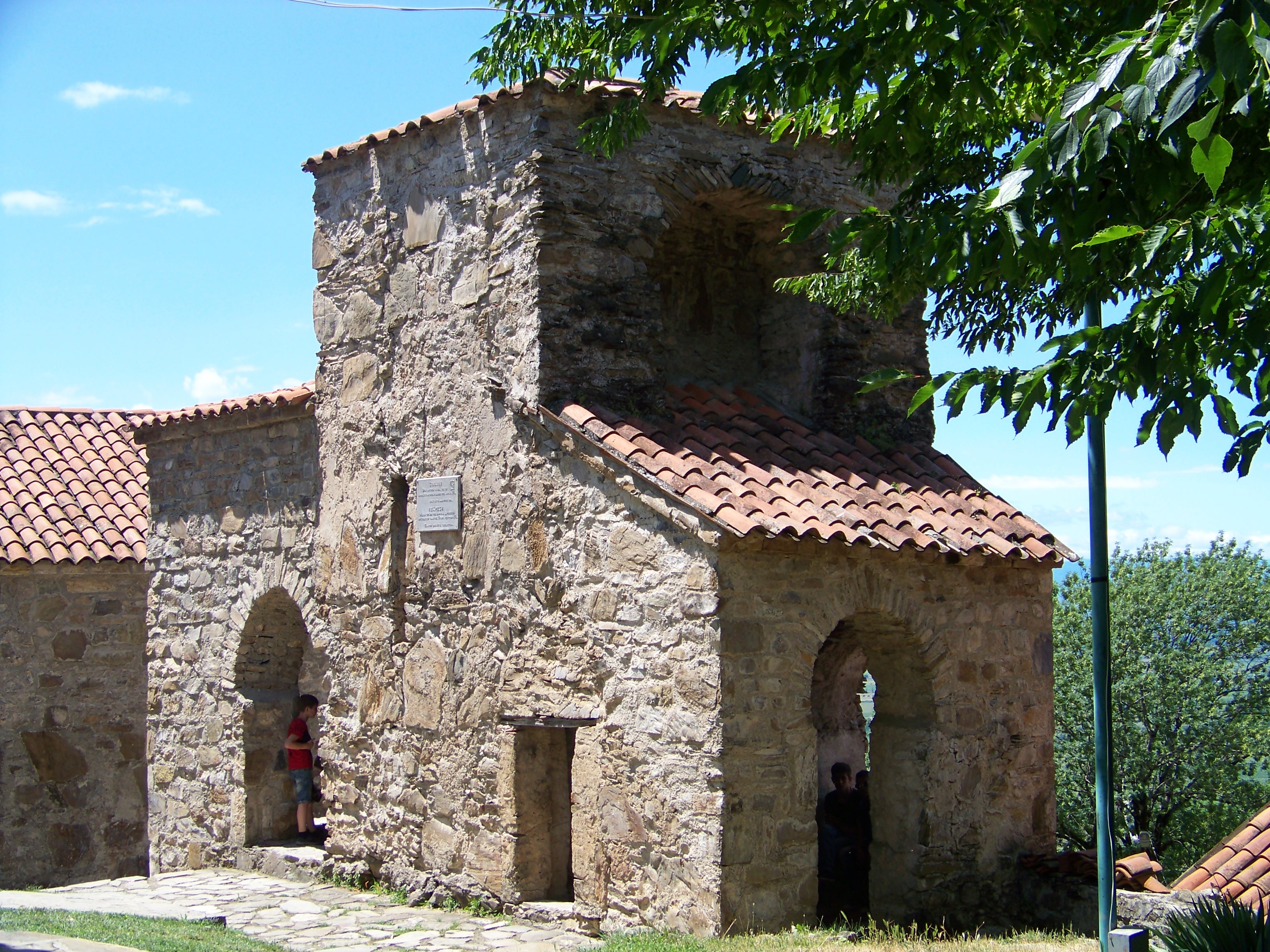
Mortuary chapel

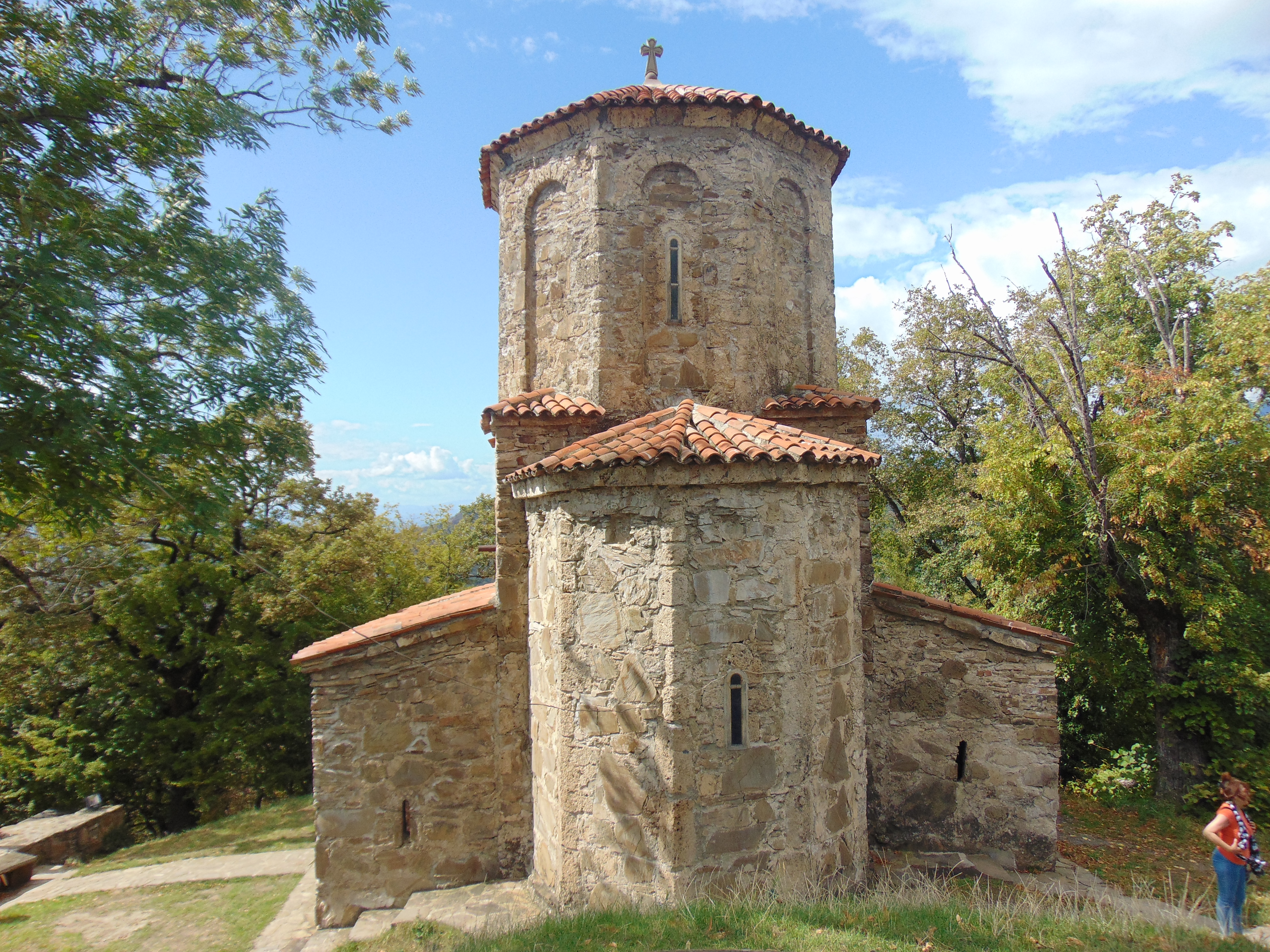
Church of the Archangel

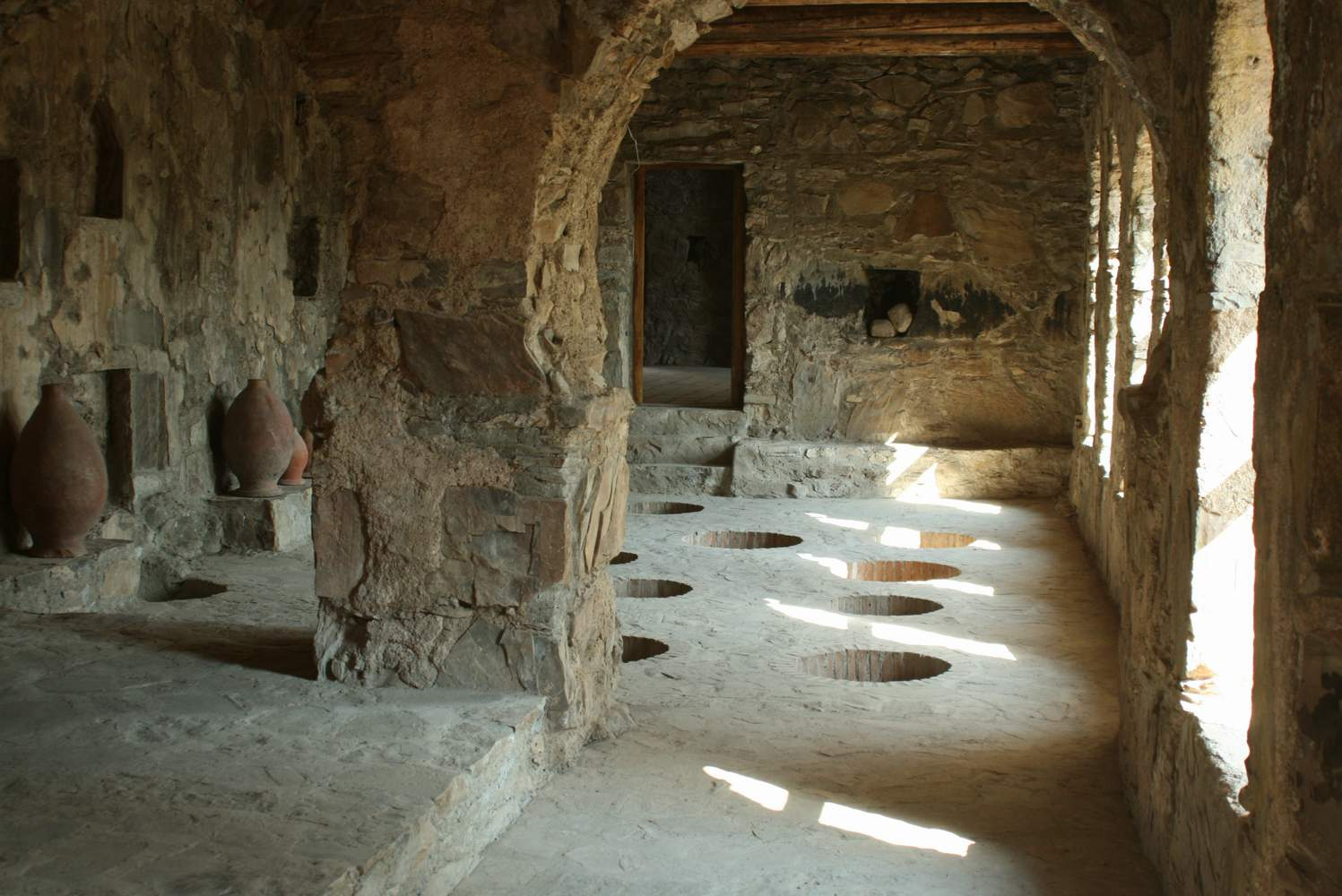
Wine-cellar in the bishop's palace

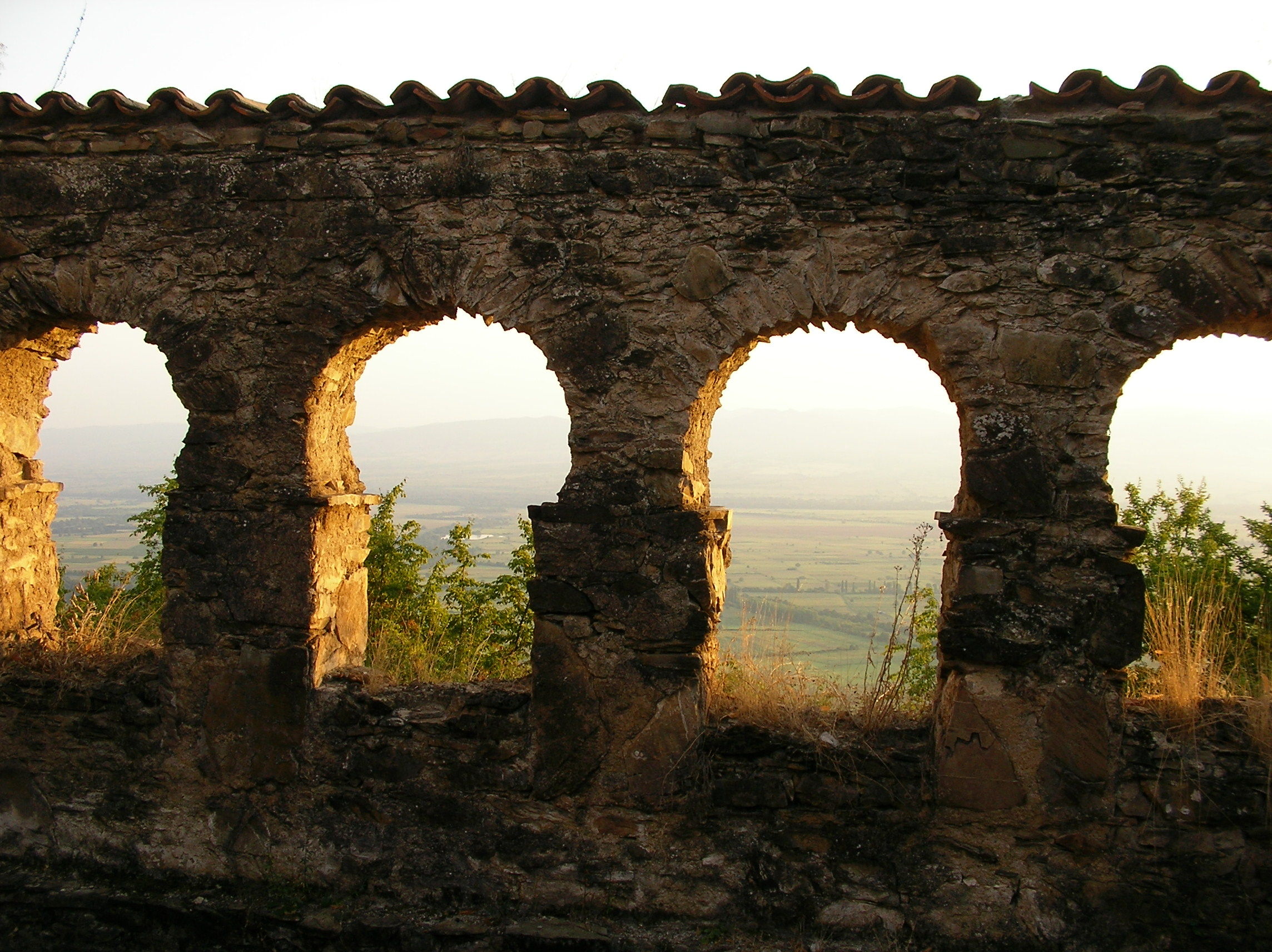
View of Alazani Valley from Nekresi walls

The Nekresi site occupies a plain of arable land and wooded slopes at the foot of the southernmost offshoot of the Greater Caucasus, between the Duruji and Chelti river beds. The most vibrant part of the town stretched 1.5 km between two hillocks, Nazvrevi Gora (literally, "a hill of former vineyards") on the east and Samarkhebis Seri ("a hill of burials") on the west. The former is topped by the Nekresi monastery and the latter contains ruins of the so-called Nagebebi complex. The central portion of the ruined town contains ruins of the Chabukauri basilica. Another large settlement area, probably the town's easternmost neighborhood, was on the left bank of the Duruji, where the Dolochopi basilica has been uncovered.

=== Nekresi monastery ===
The Nekresi monastery is a complex of buildings, including the three-church basilica of the Dormition of the Mother of God, a mortuary chapel—both dated to the 6th century, a centrally-planned church of the Archangel Michael built in the 8th or 9th century, a bishop's palace of the 9th century, as well as a 12th-century refectory, a 16th-century defensive tower, and remains of storehouses and other accessory structures. The mortuary chapel had long been considered—after Giorgi Chubinashvili—a 4th-century proto-basilica and one of the earliest Christian churches in Georgia built on the place of a former Zoroastrian shrine, but archaeological excavations found no evidence of any occupation at the site earlier than the 6th century and "the 4th-century basilica" was definitively identified as a 6th-century mortuary chapel.

=== Fire temple ===
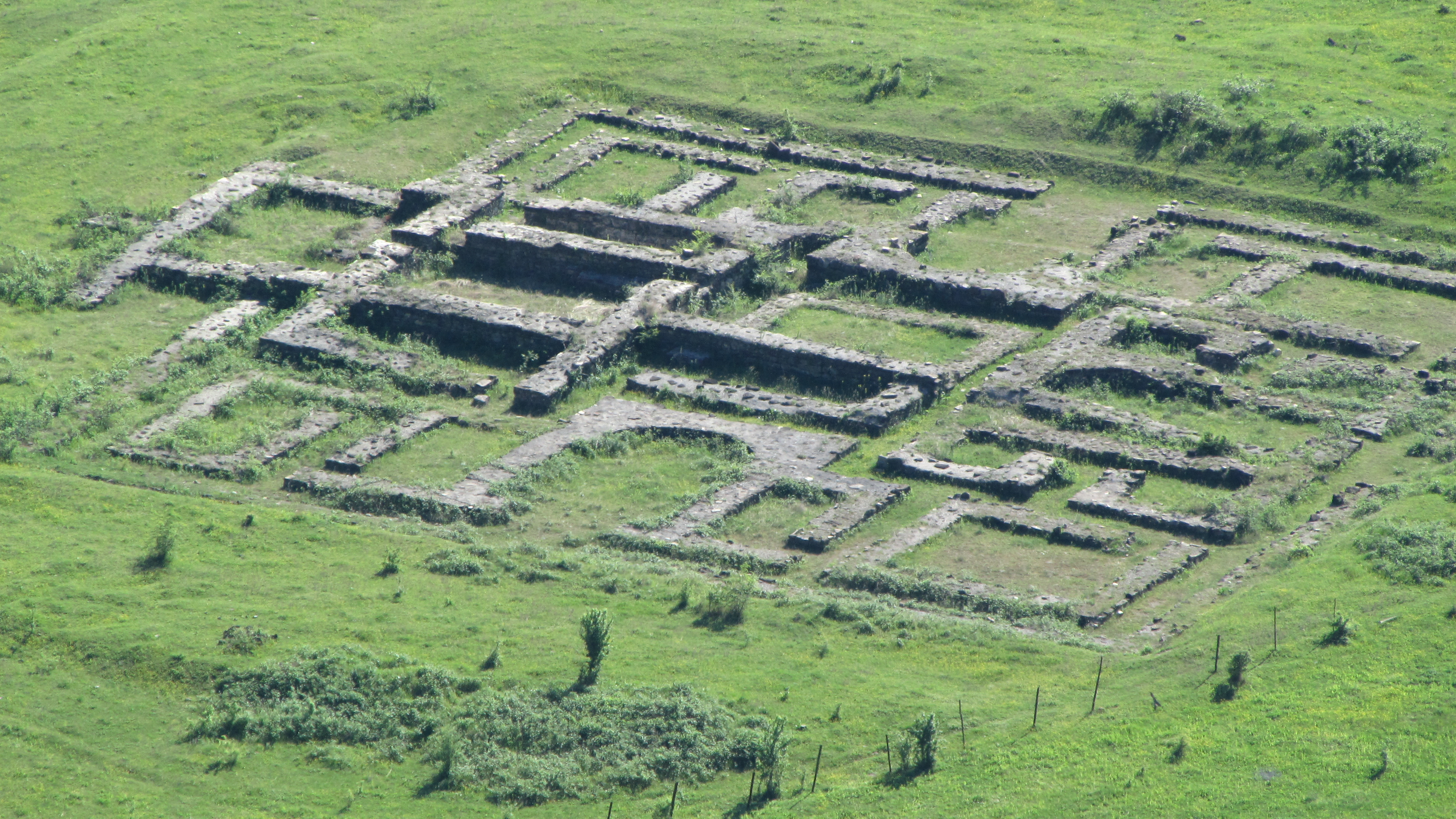
Nekresi fire temple

Remains of a Zoroastrian shrine, conventionally known as the Nekresi fire temple, have been found just south of the monastery, at the foot of Nazvrevi Gora. It is a complex rectangular structure, with two construction phases from the 2nd to 4th centuries. Charcoal from the ruins was carbondated to the 5th century suggesting that the site was destroyed at that time. An international research at the site suggested that the temple was aligned with the summer and winter solstices and it might have incorporated elements of solar worship. An alternative interpretation is that the complex was in fact a Manichean shrine.

=== Chabukauri and Dolochopi basilicas ===
Ruins of two large basilicas—known as the Chabukauri and Dolochopi churches—were uncovered some 1.5 km northwest and 3.5 km east of the Nekresi monastery, respectively, in 1998 and 2012. The former typologically dated to the 4th–5th century and the latter carbondated to c. 387, these discoveries challenged the hitherto dominant interpretation—based on an argument from silence—that the early Christian church buildings in eastern Georgia were typically limited to small and simple chapels. Both these churches are precursors to a three-church basilica, a peculiar Georgian design, in which direct communication between the three naves was nonexistent or limited.

=== Nagebebi complex ===
Archaeological digs on the hillock of Samarkhebis Seri, in the western portion of the Nekresi site—at the place locally known as Nagebebi—have unearthed a stone winery, rectangular in plan and measuring 20 x 20 m. It contained five spacious winepresses and two cisterns. The inventory was limited mostly to pottery, some of them glazed. The structure is dated to the 4th–5th century. A layer under the winery yielded remains of pre-Christian sanctuary, with ritual and sacrificial pits, and burials, dated—based on the characteristics of uncovered clayware—to the 3rd–2nd century BC.

Some 30 metres away stand the ruins of a 6th-century three-church basilica, whose outlook was altered in the early 8th century, probably as a result of an enemy attack as suggested by traces of fire. Fragments of the 12th–13th-century pottery found on the church's floor indicate that the church was still in use at that time, eventually falling to ruin in the 14th century, probably as a result of Timur's invasions of Georgia. Around the church there are a number of burials.

==== Nekresi inscriptions ====
The Nagebebi winery was the scene of resonant discovery, in 1986 and 1987, of at least six fragmented Georgian inscriptions carved in the ancient asomtavruli on stone slabs, reused in the construction of later structures. Based on the personal names mentioned in these texts and lack of allusion to Christianity, Levan Chilashvili, the chief excavator at Nekresi, argued for pre-Christian dating for these inscriptions and assigned the oldest inscription to the 4th to 2nd century BC and the most recent to the 4th century AD. The majority of Georgian and international archaeologists and linguists, find such dating difficult to accept and believe the Nekresi inscriptions to date from within the recognized horizon known for the early Georgian script, that is, the 5th century AD or later. Stephen Rapp suggests that the inscriptions may be an example of the usage of the Georgian script by non-Christian and especially Zoroastrian communities in late antique eastern Georgia. According to Livan Chilashvili's successor Nodar Bakhtadze and his collaborators,

Revealing samples of Georgian script, dated from the IV-V c.c., found during the excavation of a large wine cellar (marani) caused exceptional debate (and vastly different opinions) in Georgian scientific society. These inscriptions made in Asomtavruli script were scratched on stone blocks, used as secondary building material irregularly (top-side to bottom-side) built into the walls of the wine cellar and, therefore, were likely created even earlier. It is also worth mentioning that these inscriptions represented epitaphs, however, they do not contain supplications or appeals to God, nor Christian symbols.

=== Trinity church ===
The Trinity church of Nekresi stands about 3 km southwest of the Nekresi monastery, on a wooded hillock known as Kudigora. It is a 6th–7th-century three-church basilica, measuring 3.7 x 3.2 m. It probably functioned as a subsidiary monastery and hermitage of the Nekresi convent. The monastery seems to have functioned until the 14th century; thereafter, the building was occasionally used for church services by the inhabitants of nearby villages. Archaeological digs yielded several burials, pieces of pottery as well as boar tusks—deposited in the 11th–13th-century layers—reminiscent of a long-established tradition of boar sacrifice at Nekresi.
