= Tsilkani Cathedral =

Orthodox church in Georgia, Europe

Tsilkani cathedral of the Mother of God
- წილკნის ღვთისმშობლის ტაძარი
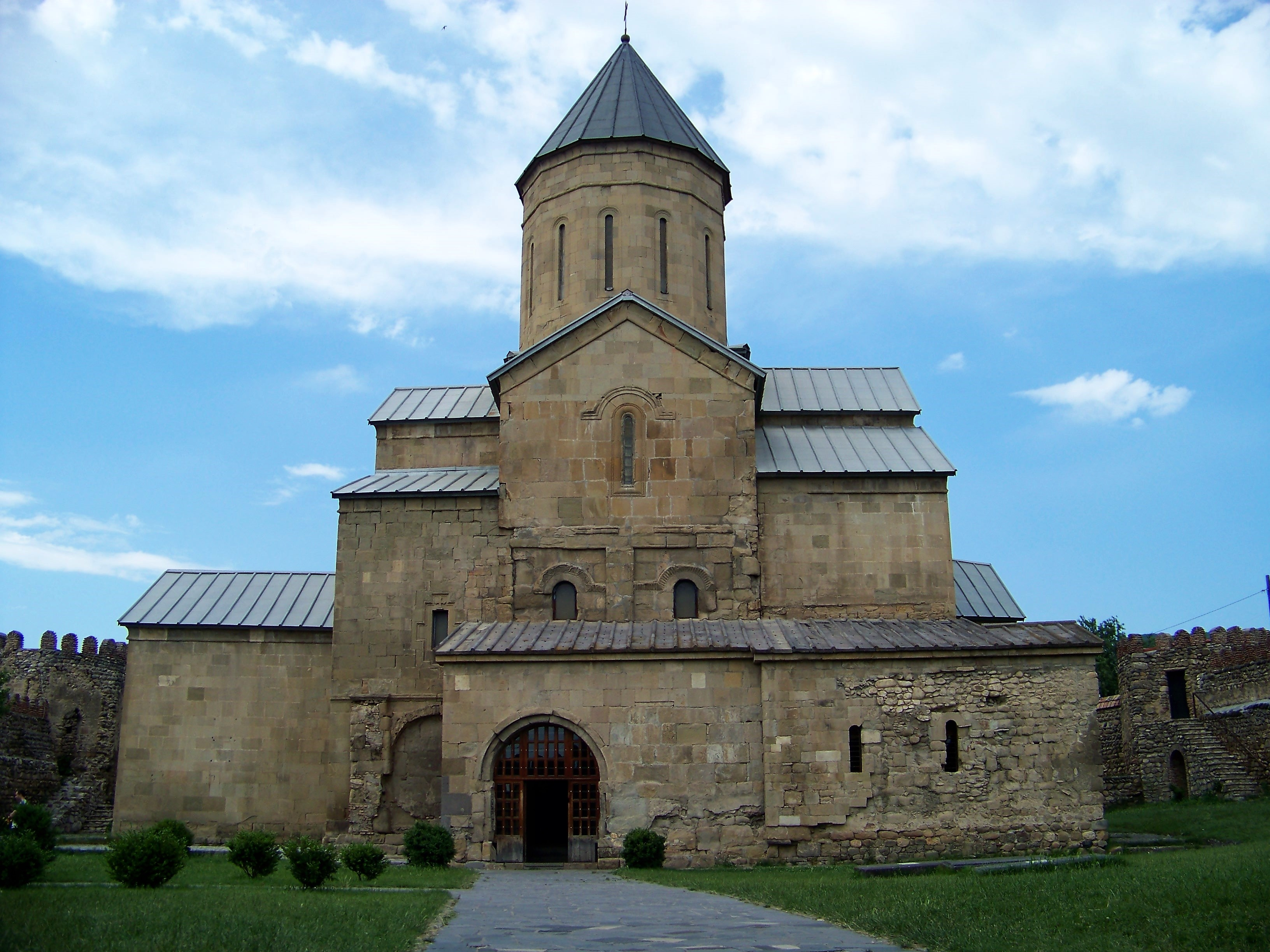
- Tsilkani cathedral.
- Interactive map of Tsilkani cathedral of the Mother of God
- Location: Tsilkani, Mtskheta Municipality, Mtskheta-Mtianeti, Georgia
- Coordinates: 41.949573°N 44.658064°E
- Type: Domed church

The Tsilkani cathedral of the Mother of God (Georgian: წილკნის ღვთისმშობლის ტაძარი, romanized: ts'ilk'nis ghvtismshoblis t'adzari) is a Georgian Orthodox church in the village of Tsilkani, Mtskheta Municipality, in Georgia's eastern region of Mtskheta-Mtianeti. Originally built in the 4th century, the church was repeatedly remodeled in the Middle Ages. The extant edifice is a domed cross-in-square design, contained in a walled enclosure with corner towers. It is inscribed on the list of the Immovable Cultural Monuments of National Significance.

== Location ==
The Tsilkani cathedral stands in the centre of the eponymous village—northwest of the ancient city of Mtskheta—on the left bank of the Narekvavi, a tributary of the Aragvi River. The village, home to a Late Bronze Age burial mound and other archaeological finds, is also notable for a 4th–5th-century Christian crypt, with a Greek inscription on its wall.

== History ==
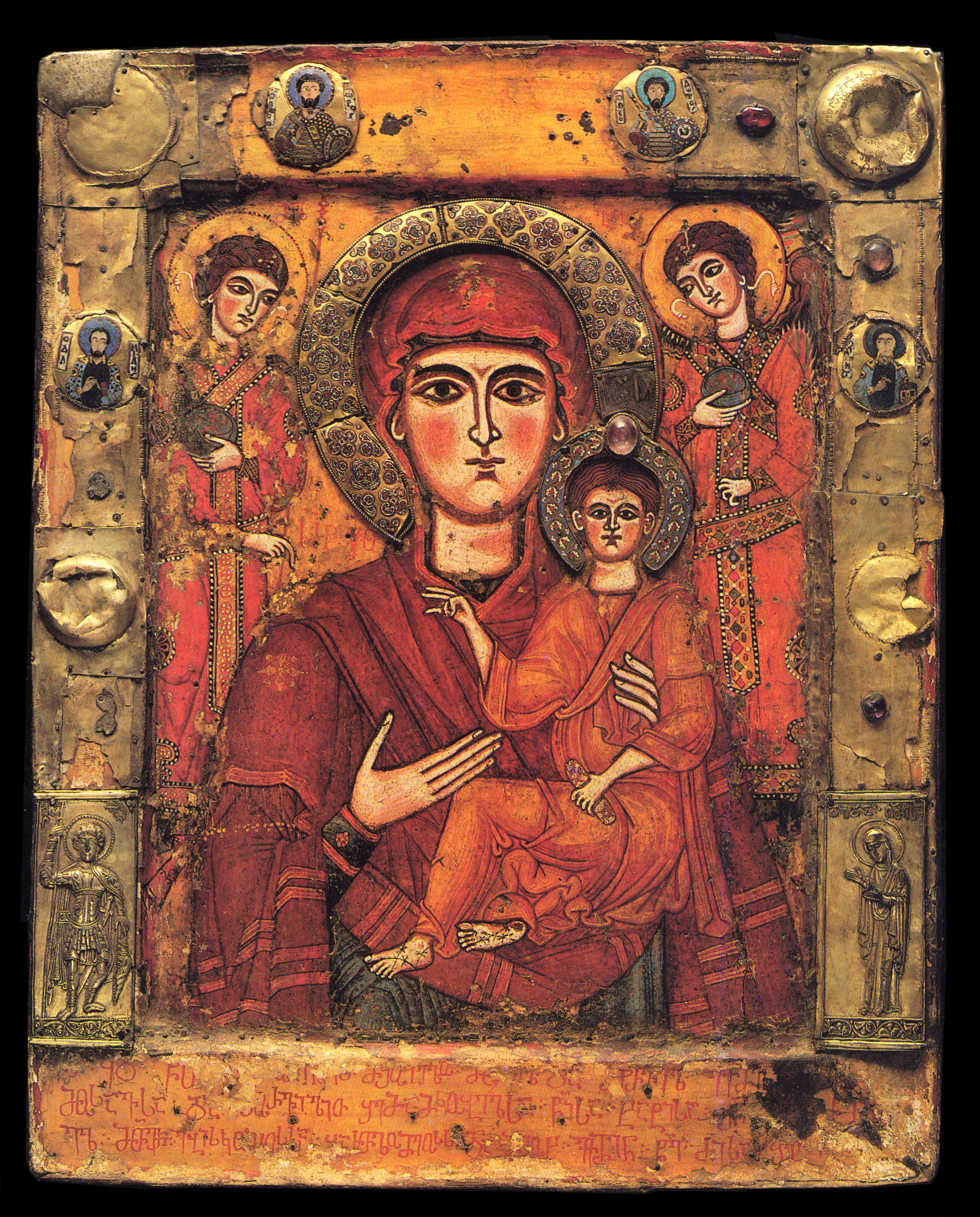
Hodegetria of Tsilkani

The Tsilkani church is credited by the medieval Georgian chronicles to King Bakar (r. c. 365–380), son of Mirian III, the first Christian king of Kartli—Iberia of the Classical sources. Originally a hall church, the cathedral was remade into a three-nave basilica in the 5th or 6th century and, eventually, reconstructed as a domed church in the 12th or 13th century. The church was further renovated in the 16th–17th century. The church was also associated in medieval Georgian tradition—elaborated in the hymns by the 13th-century cleric Arsen Bulmaisimisdze—with the monk Jesse from Antioch who came as part of the Thirteen Assyrian Fathers in Kartli around 545. It is maintained that Jesse's tomb is still preserved in the church. The cathedral was the seat of bishops of Tsilkani, first heard of in 506.

The cathedral was home to the venerated Virgin Hodegetria of Tsilkani, a 9th-century icon of the Virgin and the Child attended by the archangels. The icon was repainted and refurbished at the turn of the 12th century, but the faces painted in encaustic tempera were left untouched. In 1926, the icon was moved for preservation to the Georgian National Museum in Tbilisi.

== Layout ==
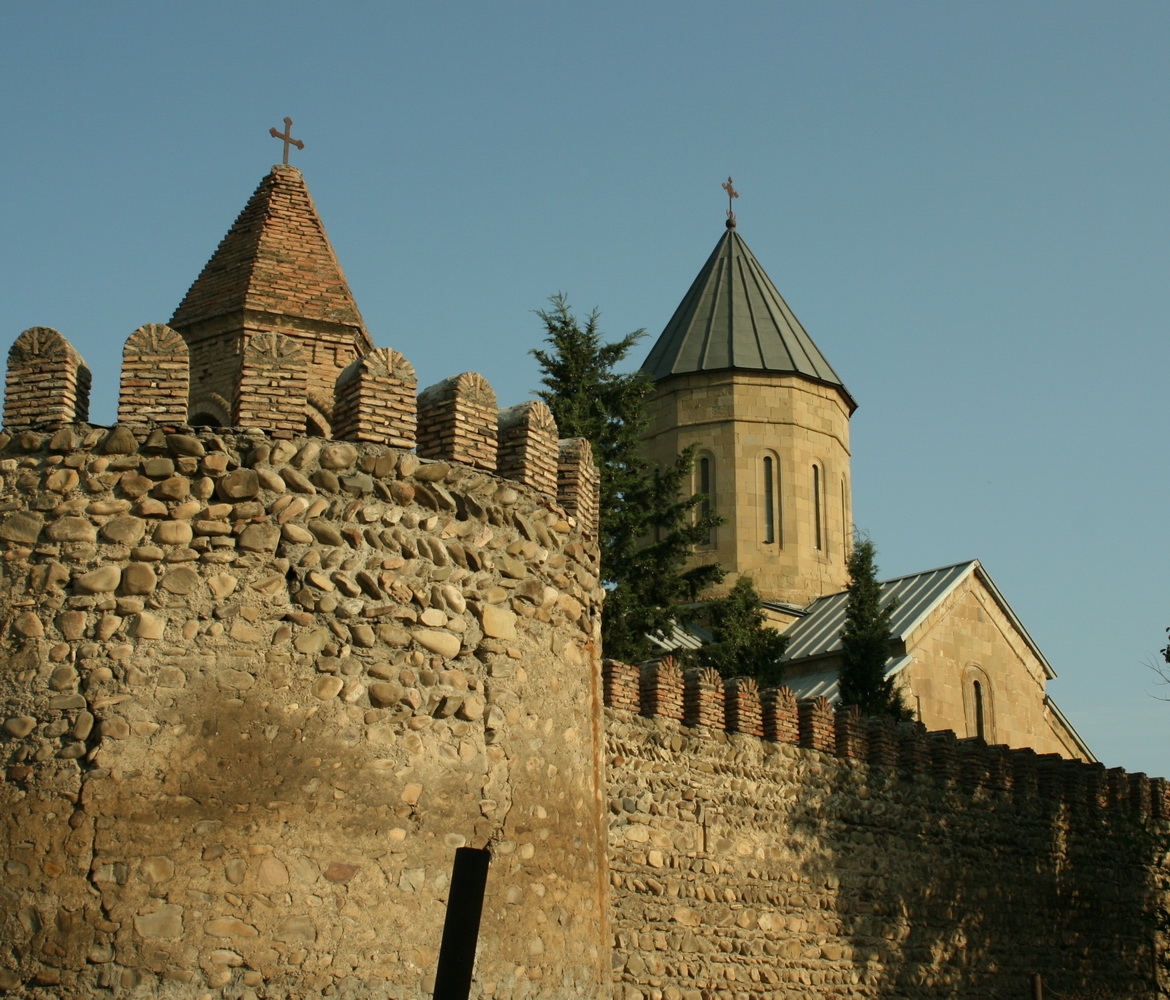
A tower with a belfry.

The extant church, measuring 28 × 24 m and built largely of dressed sandstone blocks, is a cross-in-square building, with a semicircular apse and a central dome held up on four free-standing piers. The base of the dome is pierced with 12 windows. The interior is additionally lit with 10 windows cut in the walls. The church has three entrances. To the south porch is attached a small hall church with a semicircular apse and two niches, connected via a doorway to the cathedral's south nave. The church bears remnants of the coarse wall paintings, dated from the 15th century to the 18th.

The cathedral is enclosed in a late-18th-century stone curtain wall, measuring 58 × 72 m. The wall is pierced by an arched brick gate on the southwest and a number of embrasures and contain rounded corner towers, one of which, on the southeast, is topped by a 19th-century hexagonal belfry.
