= Three-church basilica =

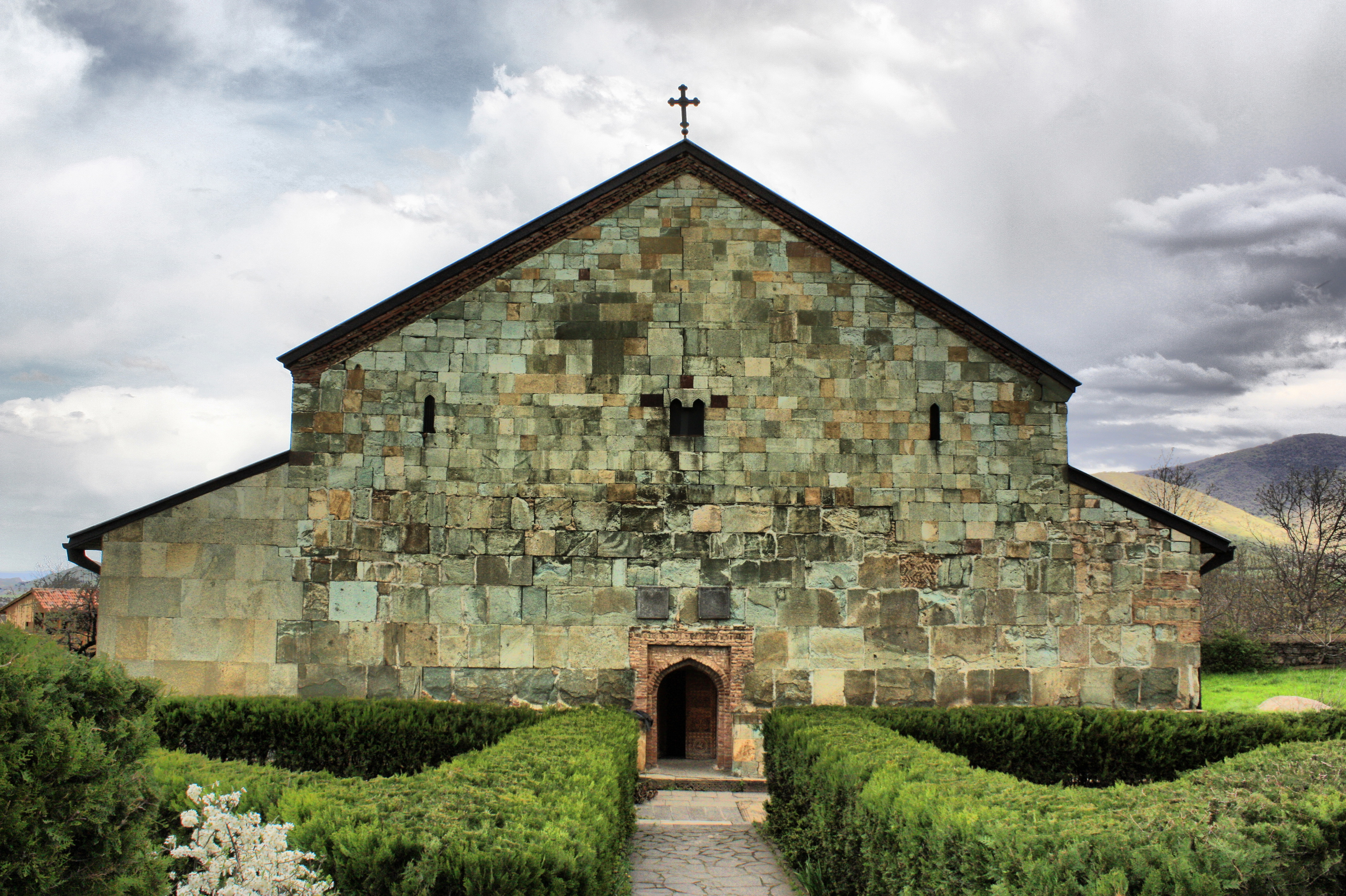
Bolnisi Sioni church, an example of a three-church basilica.

Three-church basilica (Georgian: სამეკლესიანი ბაზილიკა, romanized: samek'lesiani bazilik'a) is a special type of basilica, developed and widespread in Georgian Christian church architecture of the Early Middle Ages. In this type of basilica, the central nave is completely separated from the aisles with solid walls. This creates three seemingly independent churches. The reason for this structural solution is unknown, but it could be liturgical. Some of the earliest churches in Georgia followed this design before the standardization of church building and the liturgy took place in the 7th century.

== Features ==
Externally, three-church basilicas look like a conventional three-aisled basilica, presenting a similar outline, with the high central section covered by a gable roof and the lower side sections, each covered by a mono-pitched roof. However, unlike a conventional three-aisled basilica—terminating in a sanctuary on the east and possessing north and south aisles—a three-church basilica was designed so that there was either no direct communication between the central nave and the side aisles except through a narthex at the west end or, alternatively, they were only accessed through one door from the central nave into the auxiliary space formed by the aisles. The aisles were commonly semi-open due to the central sections of the north and south exterior walls being replaced by an arched arcade.

== Development ==
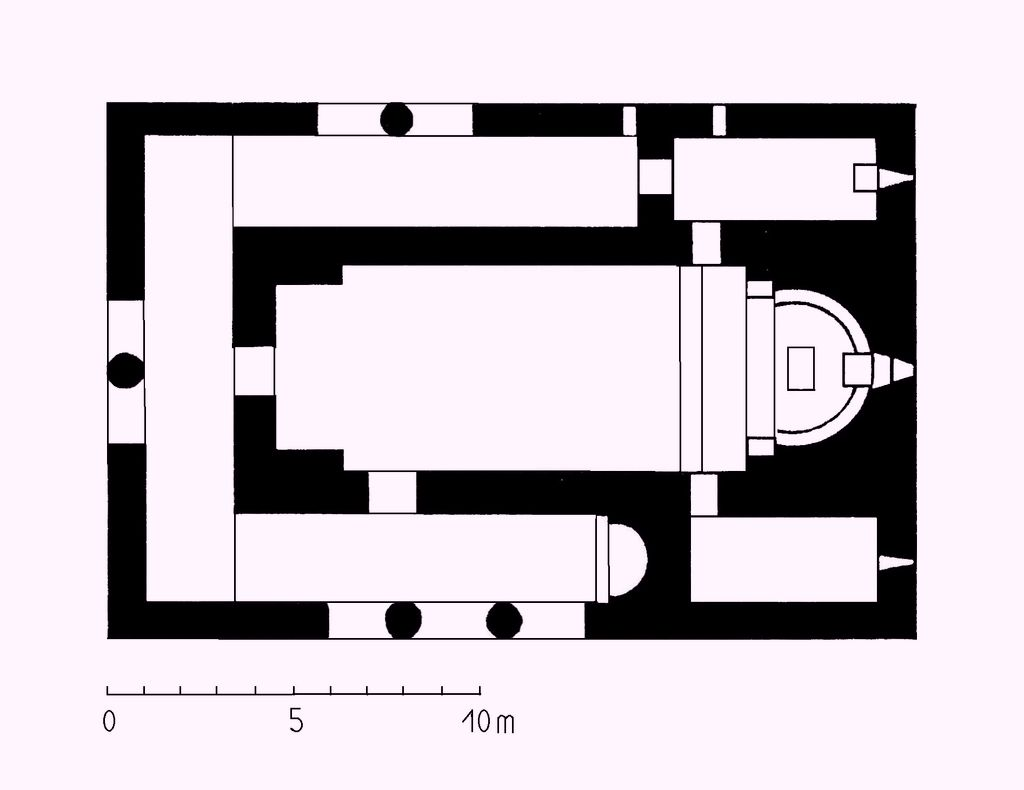
A floor plan of the Zegaani church, a three-church basilica.

The term "three-church basilica" was first introduced by the Georgian art historian Giorgi Chubinashvili who claimed that an inspiration came from Syria and these peculiar churches began to spread in Georgia in the middle of the 6th century, exemplified by a prototypical church at Nekresi. Existence of such churches in Syria has not been proven, making three-church basilica a peculiar Georgian phenomenon—a local adaptation of an Eastern Roman three-aisled model. Archaeological discoveries in the eastern Georgian region of Kakheti, especially, those of the large ruined basilicas at Chabukauri and Dolochopi, redated the invention of a three-church basilica design to the late 4th century, that is, within decades after adoption of Christianity in the eastern Georgian kingdom of Kartli—Iberia of the Classical sources. Later examples are found in Kvemo Kartli, such as the 5th-century churches at Kvemo Bolnisi and Bolnisi Sioni, and also in Kakheti, such as the 6th-century basilicas at Nekresi, Zegaani, and Dzveli Shuamta. From the late 5th century onward, the Georgian church builders moved towards smaller, centrally planned edifices; how this transition occurred is not fully understood.

The reasons behind such an architectural development is not known. Guram Kipiani argues that the form of the triple-church basilica can be linked to a Persian influence, and particularly, to a Manichean temple design, an example of which has been unearthed at Nekresi, between the two early Christian basilicas of Chabukauri and Dolochopi. According to Zaza Aleksidze, a triple-church design was an architectural solution to substantial confessional dualism that existed in late antique Kartli and these forms of basilica served to both Chalcedonian and non-Chalcedonian communities.
