= Sanavardo =

Sanavardo სანავარდო
- Location in Georgia
- Coordinates: 41°54′01″N 45°49′38″E
- Country: Georgia
- Region: Kakheti
- Municipality: Qvareli
- Elevation: 310 m (1,020 ft)

Population (2014)
  - Total: 840
- Time zone: UTC+4 (Georgian Time)

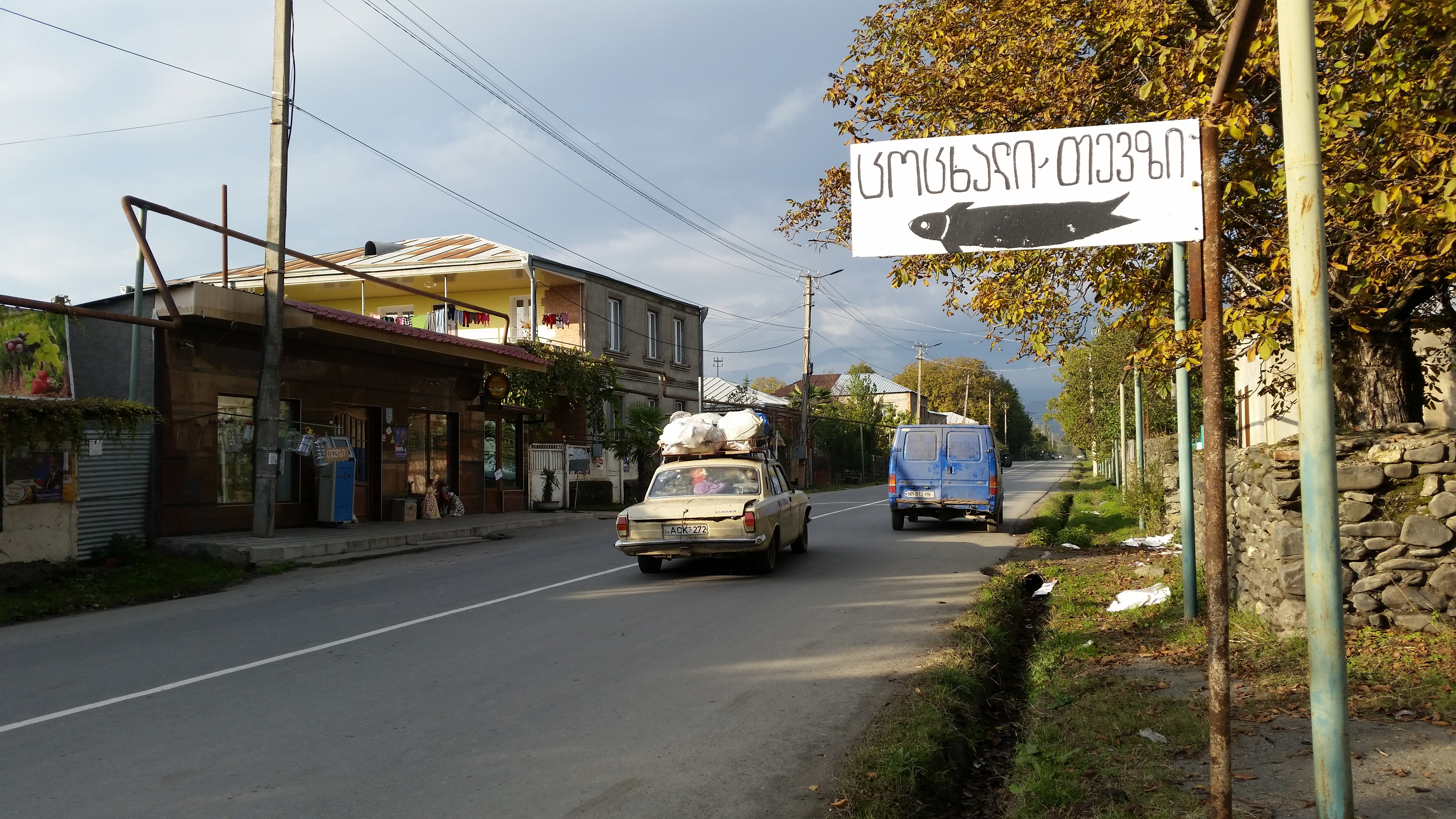
Center of Sanavardo in 2016

The village of Sanavardo is located approximately 53 mi (85 km) east of Tbilisi, the capital and largest city of Georgia (country).

Sanavardo lies in Kakheti region. Most of the families earn their living from wine making, fruit and vegetable harvesting. There are three small shops with basic goods in the village.

== History ==
According to the 1917 census of Eastern Georgia, Sanavardo had 161 residents (102 Georgians and 53 Armenians).

== See also ==
- Kakheti
