= Thirteen Assyrian Fathers =

Group of monastic missionaries

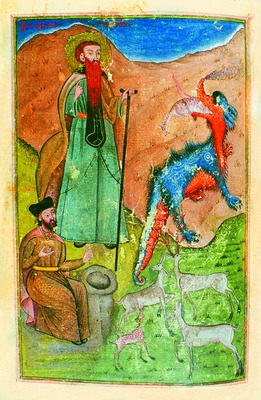
St. David of Gareja, an 18th-century miniature.

The Thirteen Assyrian Fathers (Georgian: ათცამმეტი ასურელი მამანი, romanized: attsammet'i asureli mamani) are, according to Georgian church tradition, a group of monastic missionaries who arrived from Mesopotamia to Georgia to strengthen Christianity in the country in the 6th century. They are credited by the Georgian church historians with the foundation of several monasteries and hermitages and initiation of the ascetic movement in Georgia.

== History ==
Locations in Iberia where the fathers served.

The lives of the Assyrian Fathers are related in a cycle of medieval Georgian hagiographic texts and are unattested beyond these sources. Some of these vitae are formalities composed for an 18th-century synaxary, but four of them exist in original form, as well a metaphrastic version. The dating as well as authorship of these texts is controversial. The Georgian Catholicoi Arsen I (830-87) and Arsen II (955-80) have been suggested as authors of some of the vitae. Other, unattributed, texts may have been composed earlier, in the late 7th century.

Many monasteries in modern Georgia are named after the Assyrian Fathers and are said to have been founded and led by them and their numerous disciples. In the Middle Ages, these religious foundations played an important role in forging Georgian Christian identity.

Tradition, written and oral, names as many as 19 Assyrian monks active in Georgia in the 6th century and the number "13" seems to be largely symbolic. Modern scholarly opinion is divided as to whether they were Assyrians, Assyrian-educated Georgians, whether missionaries or refugees — miaphysite or diophysite — from Syria, from which miaphysitism had retreated while Georgia was still primarily miaphysite at that time.

== Holy Fathers ==
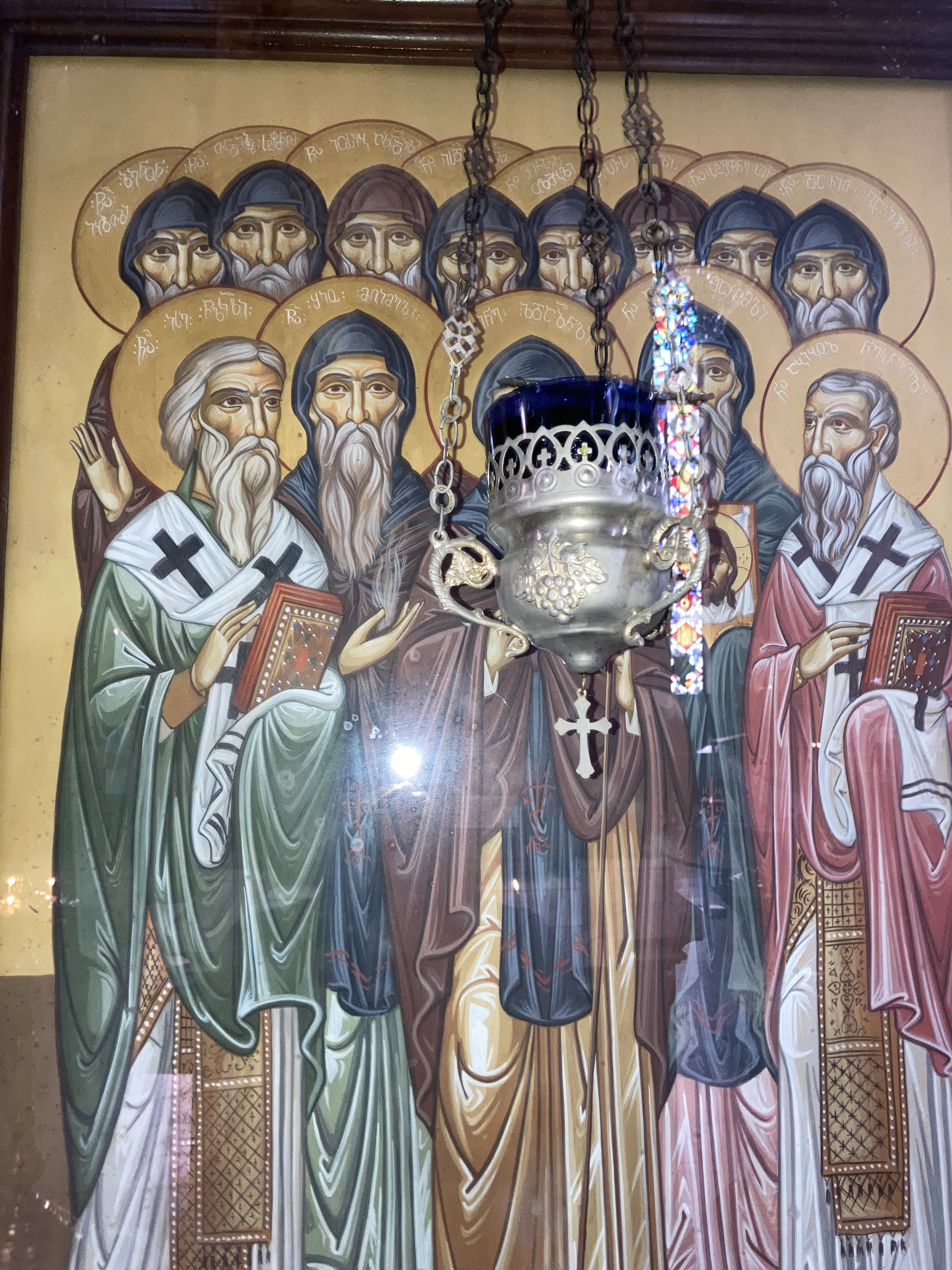
Icon of the Thirteen Assyrian Fathers

Chief of the Assyrian Fathers were:

1. Davit Garejeli (დავით გარეჯელი) / David of Gareja
2. Ioane Zedazneli (იოანე ზედაზნელი) / John of Zedazeni
3. Abibos Nekreseli (აბიბოს ნეკრესელი) / Abibos of Nekresi
4. Shio Mgvimeli (შიო მღვიმელი) / Shio of Mgvime
5. Ioseb Alaverdeli (იოსებ ალავერდელი) / Joseph of Alaverdi
6. Anton Martkopeli (ანტონ მარტყოფელი) / Anton of Martkopi
7. Tadeoz Stepantsmindeli (თადეოზ სტეფანწმინდელი) / Thaddeus of Stepantsminda
8. Piros Breteli (პიროს ბრეთელი) / Pyrrhus of Breti
9. Iese Tsilkneli (იესე წილკნელი) / Jesse of Tsilkani
10. Stepane Khirseli (სტეფანე ხირსელი) / Stephen of Khirsa
11. Isidore Samtavneli (ისიდორე სამთავნელი) / Isidor of Samtavisi
12. Mikael Ulumboeli (მიქაელ ულუმბოელი) / Michael of Ulumbo
13. Zenon Ikaltoeli (ზენონ იყალთოელი) / Zenon of Ikalto

== See also ==
- Nine Saints
