= Nekresi Monastery =

Georgian Orthodox monastery in Qvareli Municipality, Georgia

- ნეკრესის მონასტერი
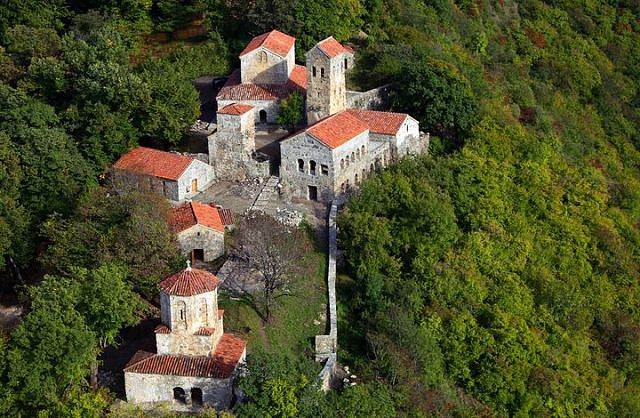
- Aerial view of the Nekresi Monastery complex
- Interactive map of Nekresi Monastery
- Location: Qvareli Municipality, Kakheti, Georgia
- Coordinates: 41.972003°N 45.767736°E
- Type: Monastery complex

The Nekresi Monastery (Georgian: ნეკრესის მონასტერი, romanized: nek'resis monast'eri) is a Georgian Orthodox monastery in the eastern Georgian region of Kakheti, founded in the 6th century. Perched on one of the easternmost spurs of the Greater Caucasus crest, the monastery is part of the larger historic site of Nekresi, once a flourishing town of the Late Antiquity. In medieval Georgian literary tradition, beginnings of monasticism at Nekresi are associated with the 6th-century monk Abibos, known for Christian proselytizing and combating Zoroastrianism. The monastery was closed down shortly after the Imperial Russian takeover of the Georgian church in 1811. After a hiatus of nearly two centuries, the monastery became functional again in 2000.

The Nekresi Monastery tops a wooded hillock known as Nazvrevi Gora (literally, "a hill of former vineyards") in the eastern portion of the Nekresi site, some 3.7 km east as the crow flies from the modern village of Shilda, Qvareli Municipality. It is a complex of buildings, including the three-church basilica of the Dormition of the Mother of God, a mortuary chapel—both dated to the 6th century, a centrally-planned church of the Archangel Michael built in the 8th or 9th century, and a bishop's palace of the 9th century, as well as a 12th-century refectory, a 16th-century defensive tower, and remains of storehouses and other accessory structures. The complex is inscribed on the list of the Immovable Cultural Monuments of National Significance of Georgia.

== History ==
King Leon, with his wife Tinatin and son Alexander, on a 16th-century fresco from Nekresi Church of the Dormition.

The Nekresi Monastery was founded in the 6th century; an earlier dominant view that the first church of the complex was built on the place of a Zoroastrian shrine in the 4th century has been disproved by archaeological excavations, which found no evidence of any occupation on the hill earlier than the 6th century. That period saw an upsurge in monasticism in eastern Georgia, popularized by the Thirteen Assyrian Fathers, a group of monks who are credited by the medieval Georgian literary tradition with founding several monasteries across the country. One of these men, St. Abibos, based at Nekresi, preached Christianity among the mountaineers east of the Aragvi and fought Zoroastrian influences—on one occasion quenching a sacred flame with water—until being captured and put to death.

Defensive tower of Nekresi, 16th century.

Although much of Nekresi's medieval history is undocumented by records and written evidence, archaeology and architectural analysis testify to an extensive building activity at the monastery complex in the 9th century even as the town of Nekresi was in an irreversible decline. The monastery, further, functioned as the seat of a Georgian bishop, entitled as Nekreseli. St. Abibos is traditionally regarded as the first bishop of Nekresi; no other local bishop is known by name until c. 1556. The establishment saw its defensive structures fortified during the relatively stable reigns of successive kings of Kakheti, Leon (r. 1518–1574) and Alexander II (r. 1574–1605).

Subsequent turmoils and incessant marauding raids from the neighboring tribes of Dagestan compelled the bishop to transfer his see from the monastery to the relative security of the church of the Mother of God in the nearby village of Shilda in 1785. Shortly after the Imperial Russian takeover of the Georgian church in 1811, the diocese of Nekresi was abolished, followed by the dissolution of the convent itself. Both were restored in modern Georgia after the fall of the Soviet Union: the former bishopric was reconstituted as the Eparchy of Nekresi within the Georgian Orthodox Church in 1995 and the monastery became repopulated by monks in 2000. From 2008 to 2010, the entire complex underwent systematic archaeological exploration and substantial renovation.

== Layout ==
=== Mortuary chapel ===
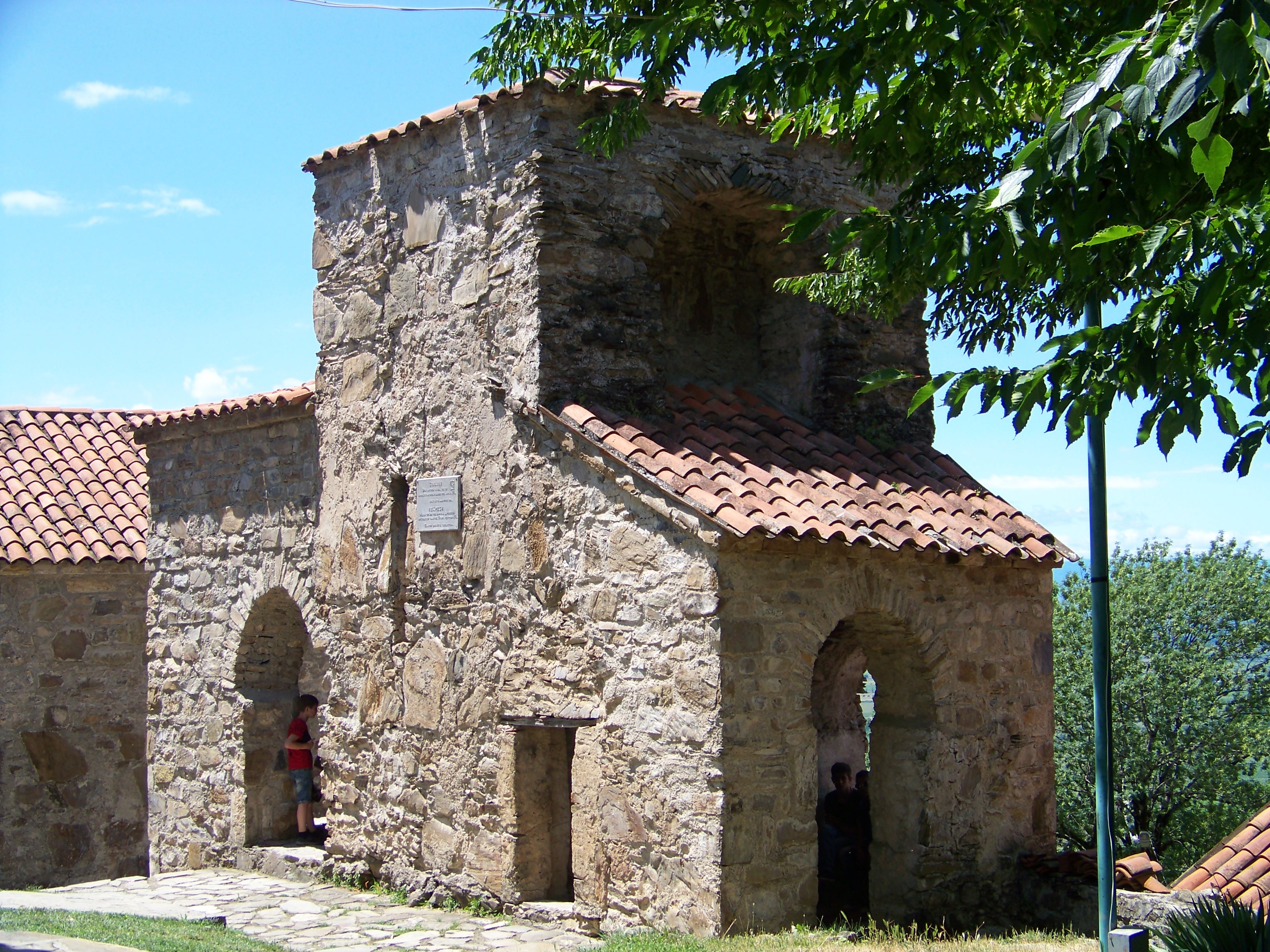
Mortuary chapel of Nekresi

The mortuary chapel is the oldest extant structure in the Nekresi Monastery complex, with the area of four square metres. A long-established belief that it was a proto-basilica built on the place of a former Zoroastrian temple in the late 4th century—and, thus, one of the oldest Christian churches in Georgia—was disproved by the 2008–2009 archaeological study which found no evidence of pre-Christian occupation at the site and redated the structure to the 6th century. The chapel is a hall building, with a miniature horseshoe-shaped sanctuary on the east. It has entrances on the north, south and east sides and is open to the elements on all sides. The structure has a vaulted crypt under the main floor that was used for burials suggesting that the building was built as a mortuary chapel.

=== Church of the Dormition ===
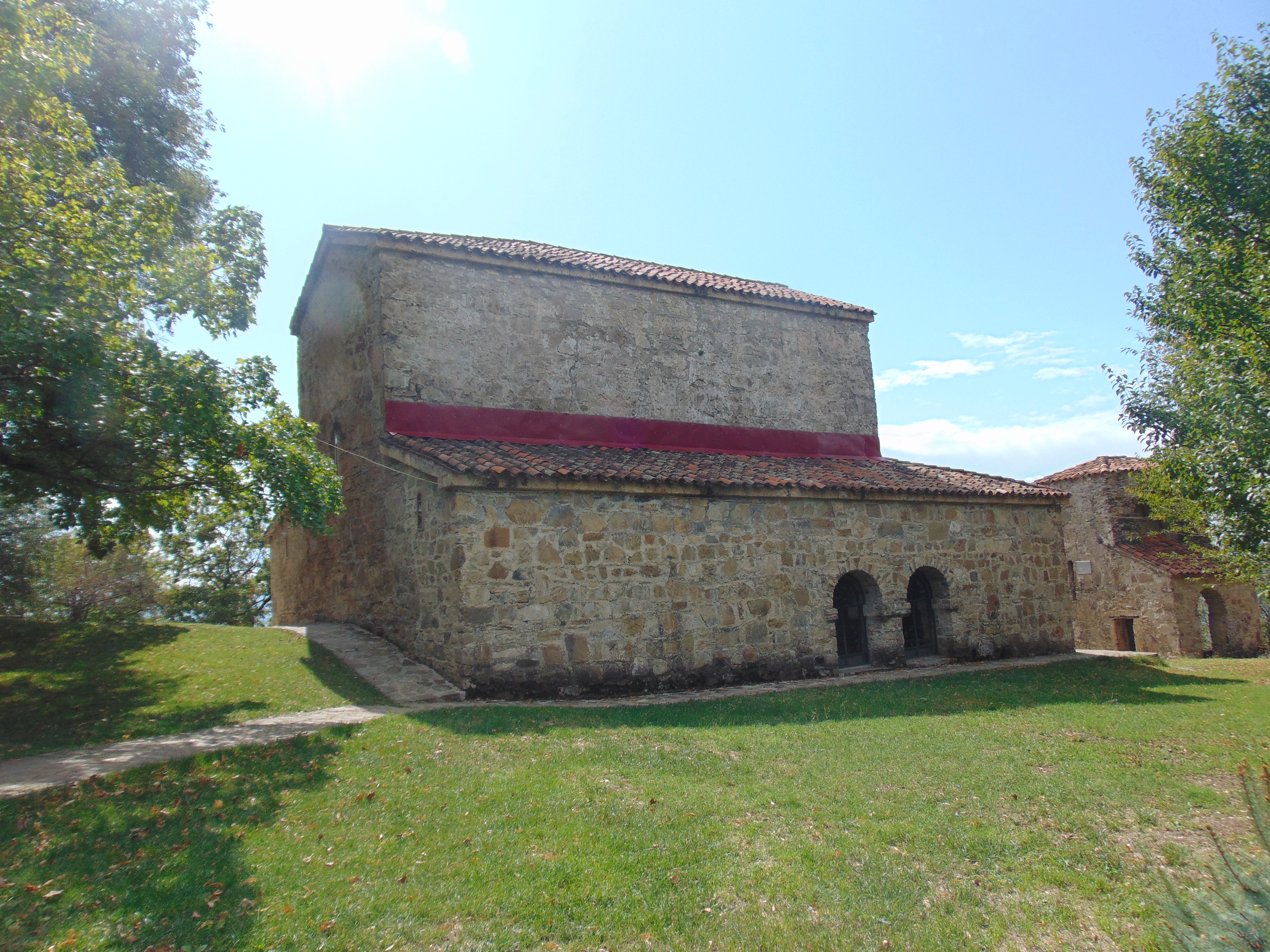
Church of the Dormition.

The church of the Dormition of the Mother of God, standing south of the mortuary chapel, is dated to the 6th or 7th century. It is built of rubble and measures 17.2 x 12.7 metres. It belongs to a type of church building known in Georgia as a three-church basilica, in which the central nave and two side aisles are separated by solid walls. In the Nekresi church, the narthex on the west side opens onto all three aisles. The central nave terminates in a deep sanctuary apse on the east, which is flanked by the rectangular pastophoria on its either side. The side naves also end in apses. The north aisle communicates with the central nave through a door, but the corresponding door on the south aisles seems to have been blocked up centuries ago as the 16th-century frescoes now cover that area. The north and south aisles are open to the exterior with arcades of two arches.

The interior of the church is adorned with frescoes commissioned by King Leon of Kakheti in the middle of the 16th century. The king, with his family, is depicted in the western portion of the south wall. The paintings bear an influence of the late Byzantine Paleologian art.

=== Church of the Archangel ===
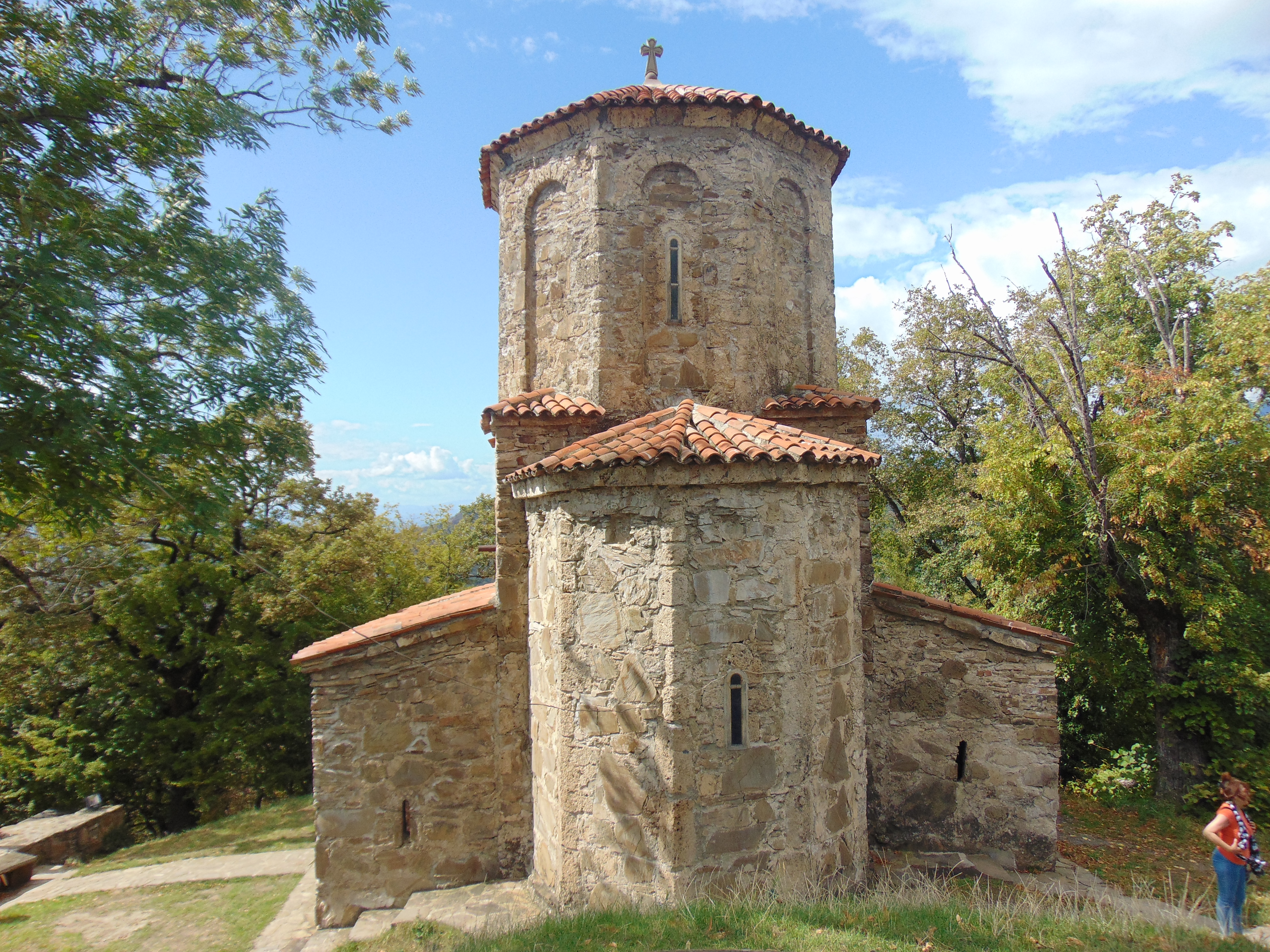
Church of the Archangel.

The church of the Archangel is an 8th–9th-century building situated in the south-western portion of the Nekresi Monastery complex. Built of rubble with the additional use of limestone slabs, it is a centrally-planned church, with transitional features of a domed three-church basilica. It has two apsed side aisles to the north and south of the central nave. The latter terminates in a pentagonal sanctuary apse which is pierced by a single window. A window in the north aisle is sealed. The south aisle and the narthex in the west both are open to the exterior through two-arched arcades. Transition from the central square to the circle of the dome is effected by two squinchs to the west and proto-pendentives to the east. The drum of the dome has windows to the east, south and west. The interior of the central part of the church bears now barely discernable traces of frescoes. About 25 metres northeast of the church, on a terraced slope, a number of monks' cells have been uncovered.

=== Bishop's palace and other structures ===
Parts of the monastery complex: the bishop's palace (right), mortuary chapel (left), refectory (left, foreground), and tower (right, background).

The bishop's palace is a two-storey building, standing a few metres southwest of the church of the Dormition. The windows on both floors have sharply defined horseshoe-shaped arches, an architectural element not in use in Georgia after the 9th–10th century. The rooms are arranged in an enfilade. The ground floor is almost completely occupied by a wine cellar, with a large rectangular stone winepress in its northern part and a number of wine-jars (kvevri) buried underground. The ceiling is supported by an octagonal column in the centre. A two-flight staircase leads up to a terrace, which then continues into the main chamber of the upper floor. The building was roofed by wooden beams supporting terracotta tiles. To the east, the palace is adjoined by a one-story vaulted building thought to have been a refectory on account of its location next to the wine cellar.

Adjacent to the north wall is a three-storey defensive tower built in the 16th century. It is built upon an earlier rectangular structure with a water reservoir and is equipped with embrasures. Its uppermost floor, with larger openings, was also used as a belfry.
