= Levan Chilashvili =

Georgian archaeologist and historian (1930-2004

Levan Chilashvili (Georgian: ლევან ჭილაშვილი; August 17, 1930 – April 26, 2004) was a Georgian archaeologist and historian, an academician of the Georgian Academy of Sciences (GAS), Meritorious Scholar of Georgia, Doctor of Historical Sciences, and Professor.

In 1954, he graduated from the Faculty of History of Tbilisi State University (TSU), where he was also a professor from 1967 until his death in 2004. In 1958, Chilashvili received his PhD in history, and in 1967, he received a degree as Doctor of Historical Sciences.

In 1991, he was elected Academician of the Georgian Academy of Sciences (GAS).

Chilashvili was also Director of the Georgian National Museum of the GAS (1980–2004).

In 1982, he was awarded the Simon Janashia Prize of the GAS.

Levan Chilashvili's main fields of scientific inquiry was archaeology and the history of ancient Georgia. From 1995 to 2003, Chilashvili's archaeological expedition in Nekresi (the Kakheti region of Eastern Georgia) discovered early Georgian inscriptions which he controversially dated from the 2nd or 1st century BC to the 3rd centuries AD.

== See also ==
- List of Georgians

== Some of main scientific works of Levan Chilashvili ==
- "Town of Rustavi" (a monograph), Tbilisi, 1957 (in Georgian)
- "Ancient town Urbnisi" (a monograph), Tbilisi, 1964 (in Georgian)
- "Towns of Kakheti" (a monograph), Tbilisi, 1980 (in Georgian)
- "Areshi" (a monograph), Tbilisi, 1991 (in Georgian)
- "The Pre-Christian Georgian inscription from Nekresi".- E. Khintibidze (Ed.) "Kartvelology", No 7, Tbilisi, 2000
- "The ancient Georgian inscriptions of Nekresi and questions of the history of Georgian writing" (a monograph), Tbilisi, 2004 (in Georgian)
