= Abibos of Nekresi =

Georgian saint

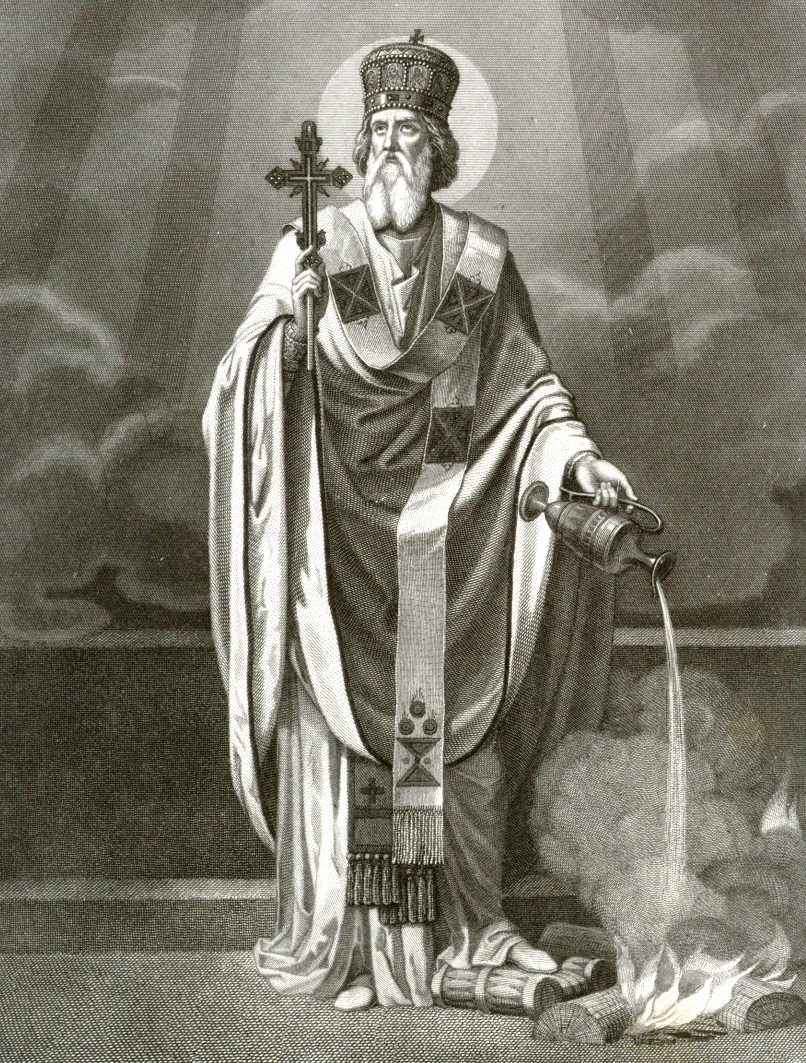
- Abibos quenching holy fire in a Zoroastrian temple. Mikhail Sabinin, 1882.

Bishop, Preacher, Martyr
- Died: Mtskheta, Georgia
- Venerated in: Eastern Orthodox Church
- Major shrine: Samtavro Monastery, Mtskheta
- Feast: December 12 (Gregorian); November 29 (Julian)
- Attributes: Episcopal vestments; extinguishing sacred fire

Abibos of Nekressi (Georgian: აბიბოს ნეკრესელი, romanized: abibos nek'reseli) (fl. 6th century) was one of the thirteen Assyrian apostles of Georgia and the bishop of Nekresi who arrived in Georgia under the leadership of St. Ioane of Zedazeni (John of Zedazeni).

He began his activity as bishop in a village located in the hills in the eastern region of Kakheti. According to the chronicle Life of Kartli, he spread Christianity not only among Georgians but also among mountain tribes such as the Dagestani/Didoians, the ancient predecessors of modern Dagestan.

At that time eastern Georgia was under Persian rule, where the dominant religion was Zoroastrianism. St. Abibos is said to have doused a sacred Zoroastrian flame with water. He was captured by Zoroastrian priests, tied and beaten, and brought before the marzban. Simeon the Stylite of the Wonderful Mountain sent him a letter, an eulogia (probably a piece of prosphoron), and a staff to strengthen his soul. He was stoned to death by Zoroastrian Persians at Rekhi, and his body was dragged from the city and cast to the beasts.

Despite strict prohibition, the priests and monks of Rekhi stole his body and buried it with great honor at Samtavisi Monastery (located midway between Mtskheta and Gori). During the rule of Prince Stepanoz of Kartli, the relics of St. Abibos were relocated from Samtavisi to Samtavro Monastery in Mtskheta, where they were buried beneath the altar.

His feast day had been kept on November 12 until 1700, but was later changed to December 12 (Gregorian calendar) and November 29 (Julian calendar).

== Sources ==
- Holweck, F. G. (1924). A Biographical Dictionary of the Saints. St. Louis, MO: B. Herder Book Co.
- Rapp Jr., Stephen H. (2017). The Sasanian World through Georgian Eyes: Caucasia and the Iranian Commonwealth in Late Antique Georgian Literature. Routledge. p. 145.
