= Synthronon =

Bench structure in a Byzantine church

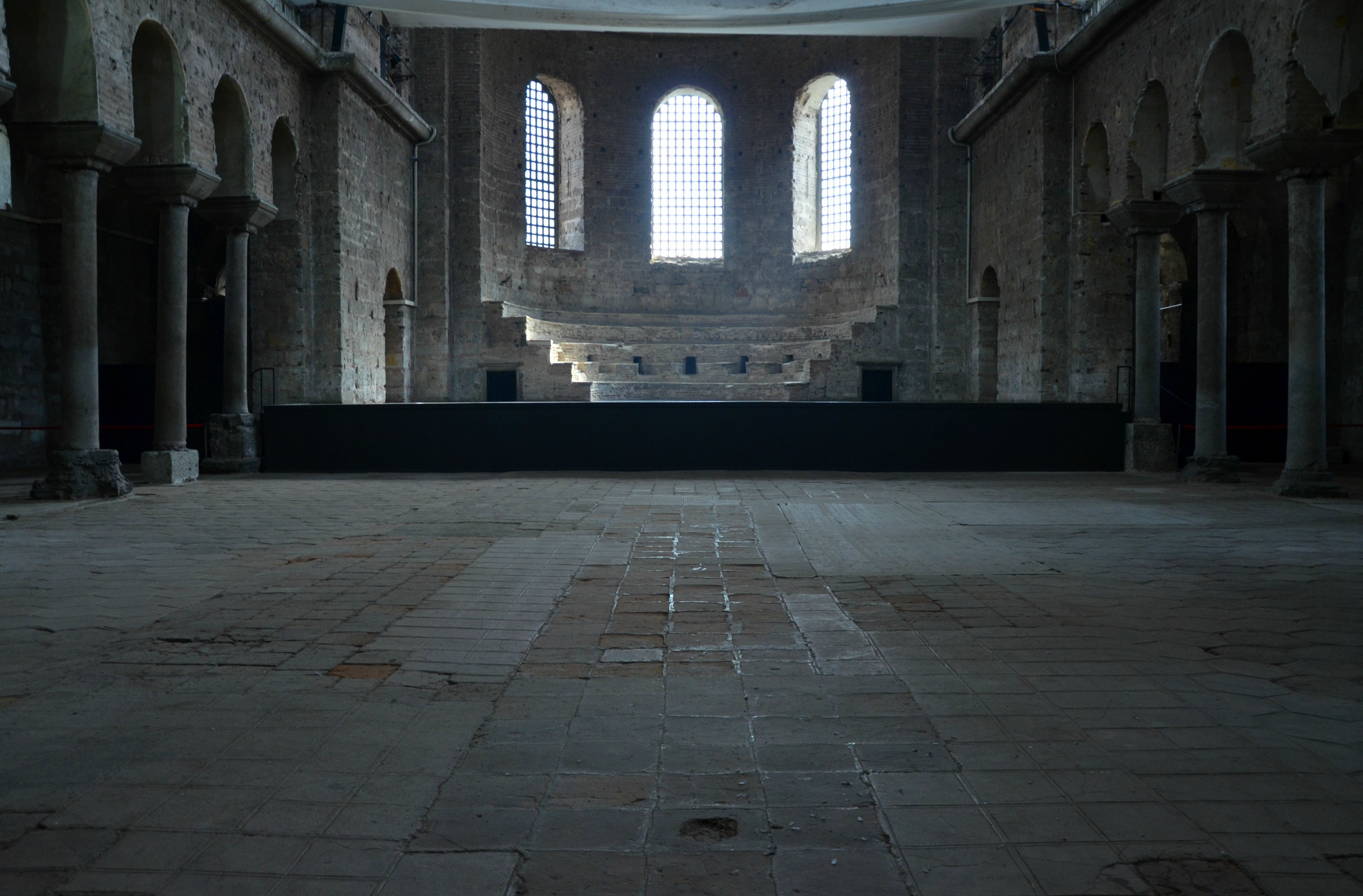
A synthronon at Hagia Irene in Constantinople (modern Istanbul, Turkey).

The synthronon (Greek: σύνθρονον; plural: σύνθρονα, synthrona) is a semicircular tiered structure at the back of the altar in the liturgical apse of an Eastern Orthodox church that combines benches reserved for the clergy with the bishop's throne in the centre.

The term is known from at least the 5th century. Some of the well-preserved synthrona exist in the 6th-century Byzantine churches of Saint Irene and Saint Euphemia in Constantinople. These structures were high enough to allow a space for a passage underneath and along the apse wall. According to the 8th-century Pseudo-Germanos, the bishop's ascent to the synthronon symbolized both Christ's sacrifice and subsequent glory, while the hierarch seated on the throne and flanked by the clergy represented Christ among his disciples.
