= Qvareli Municipality =

Coordinates: 41.9514°N 45.8017°E

Kvareli Municipality ყვარლის მუნიციპალიტეტი
- Municipality
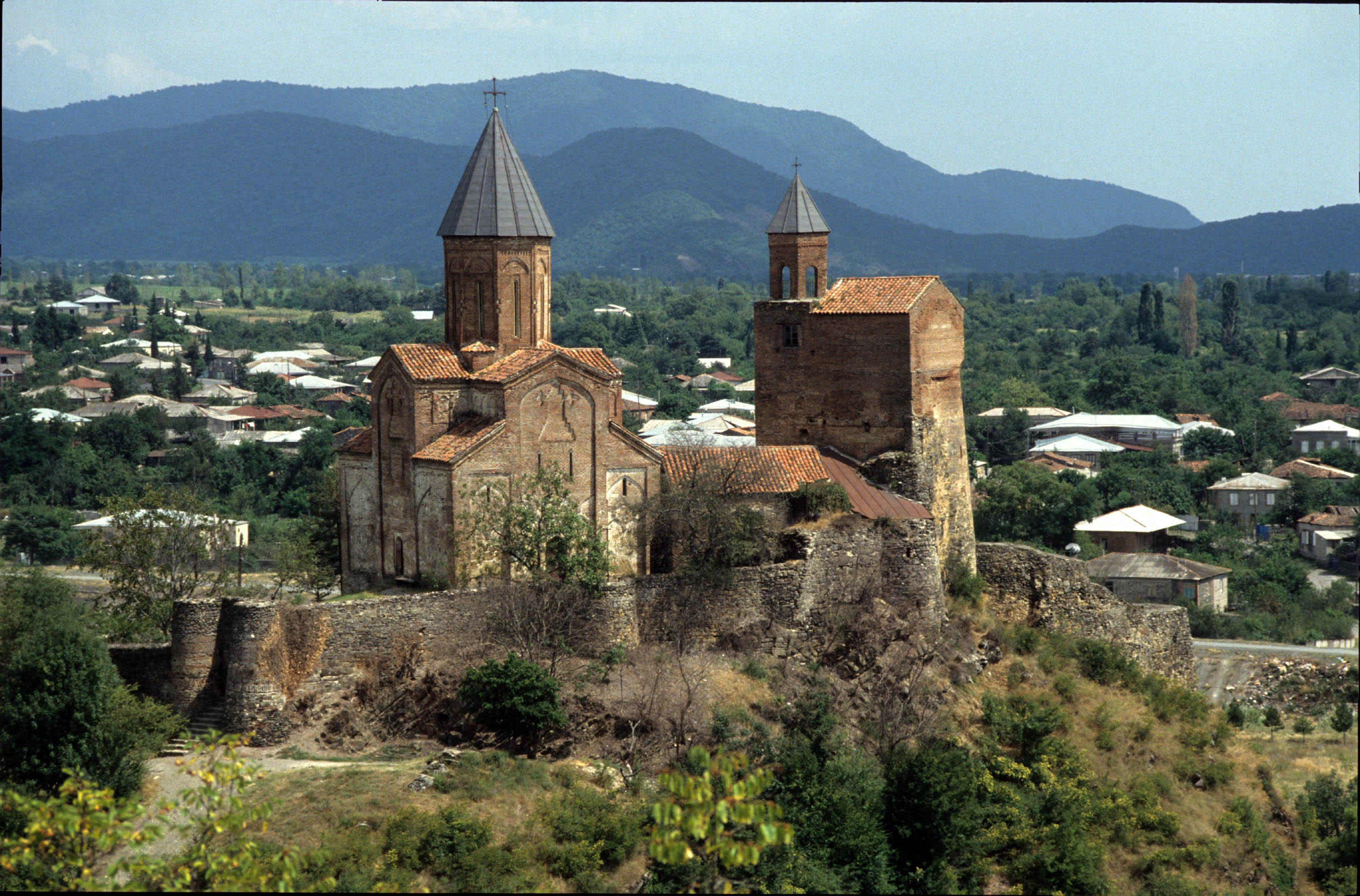
- Gremi

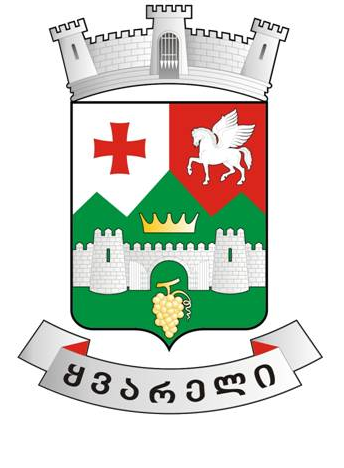
- Flag Seal

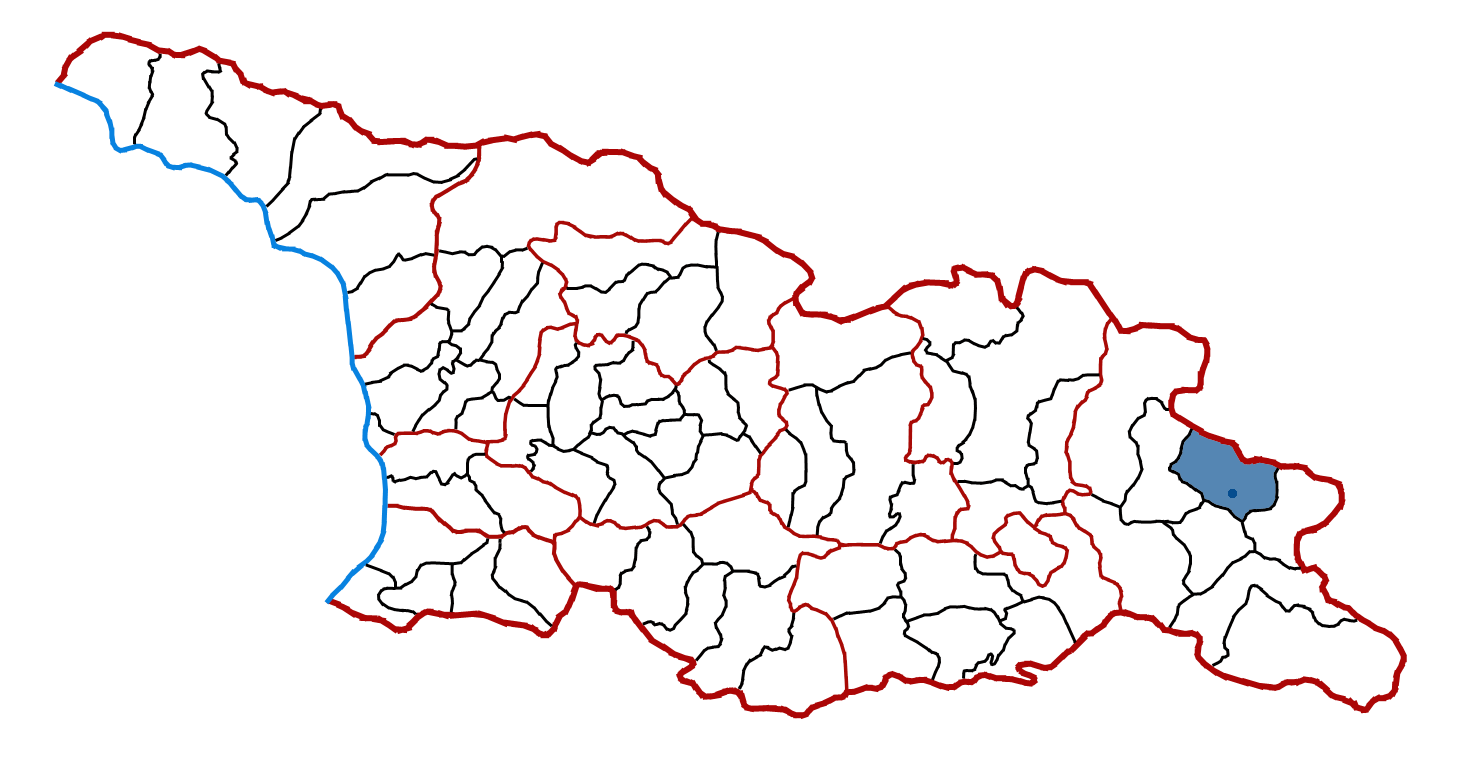
- Qvareli Municipality
- Interactive map of Kvareli Municipality
- Country: Georgia
- Mkhare: Kakheti
- capital city: Kvareli

Government
  - mayor: Givi Zautashvili

Area
  - Total: 1,000.8 km^{2} (386.4 sq mi)

Population (2014)
  - Total: 29,827
  - Density: 29.803/km^{2} (77.190/sq mi)

Population by ethnicity
  - Georgians: 93.84%
  - Avars: 3.26%
  - Ossetians: 1.21%
  - Udis: 0.55%
  - Armenians: 0.47%
- Time zone: UTC+4 (Georgian Standard Time)
- Website: http://kvareli.gov.ge/

Kvareli (Georgian: ყვარლის მუნიციპალიტეტი) is an administrative-territorial unit in eastern Georgia, in the northeastern part of the Kakheti region. Until 1917, the territory of Qvareli Municipality was included in Telavi Mazra of Tbilisi Governorate; with the administrative division of 1921, the territory of Qvareli Municipality was again assigned to Telavi Mazra. Since 1930, it has been formed as a separate district. Currently, it is a municipality. The city of Qvareli, located at the confluence of the Bursa and Duruji rivers, has been a city since 1964.

Area: 1000,8 km^{2}.

== History ==
Historical sources and archaeological field investigations have confirmed that there were ancient settlements in the territory of Qvareli municipality. At the State Museum of Academician Simon Janashia, archaeological items found in the area of present-day Shielda and Enisli, which belong to the Late Bronze Age, are preserved, and in the territory of Old Gavazi (now Akhalsopeli), Balghojiani and Gremi, household and war items of the ancient era are conserved. Gremi-Nekresi area shelters ancient religious structures. The religious center of this region was Nekresi, founded by King Pharnajom (2nd–1st century BC). In the 4th century, King Thrdat built a church here, where one of the Assyrian fathers, Abibos, settled in the 6th century. During his time, the episcopal diocese of Nekresi was founded (it existed until the 19th century). Nekresi was immediately given great importance. Nekresi Episcopal Diocese included not only Gaghmamkhari but also part of Dagestan (Didoeti). The monastery complex of Nekresi combines several monuments of Georgian architecture, of which the small basilica of the second half of the IV century is one of the oldest churches that have survived to this day in Georgia. The large three-church basilica belongs to the beginning of the 7th century. A tower was built for the bishop's two-story palace (8th–9th century, now in ruins) in the 16th century. On the monastery's territory, there are remains of residential and commercial buildings, small chapels and others.

In the XV-XVI centuries, the kingdom of Kakheti reached the peak of its power; during this period, its throne city was Gremi. The unique Gremi fortress with the Church of the Archangel, ruins, archaeological material and historical sources in the territory of Nakalakari confirm that it was one of the most important trades and economic centers of the feudal age Georgia. Manuscripts have been reproduced here since the 15th century. Important caravan routes passed through Gremi, including the "Silk Road", which connected China with the Mediterranean and Black Sea countries.

Though Gremi was the capital of Kakheti, very little information about its history, lifestyle and appearance has been preserved. However, the surviving buildings and archaeological material prove the strength and importance of the city. During the campaigns of Shah Abbas I of Iran in 1614–1616, Gremi was brutally attacked and turned into ruins. Since then, Gremi, as the throne city of Kakheti, existed for a while but could not restore its old glory. In 1667, a safer place for the throne city was identified, and King Archil chose Telavi as the capital of Kakheti, which was relatively safe from the constant attacks of the Dagestani feudal lords.

Areshi, or Arishi, was the name of the village in Qvareli municipality, on the territory of which today's village of Mtisdziri is located. It was a strategic point in ancient Hereti, on the trade route that connected Kartli and Kakheti to the interior regions of Albania in the early feudal times. A sheep road that used to take sheep to the mountains of Dagestan passed through Aresh and still passes today. According to "Matiane Kartlisai" at the beginning of the 10th century, the combined army of the Abkhaz king Constanti and Kvirike, the Chorebishop of Kakheti, defeated the army of Hereti, and according to the truce, Adarnase, the Patricius of Herteti, gave Orchobi to Kvirike, and Gavazni and Areshi to Constanti".

The material remains of the old glory – ancient strongholds and the ruins of carved churches – are preserved in abundance in this area. And to further glorify the name, it is enough that the people of Areshi, together with other nobles of Hereti, contributed to the unification of Georgia. Many sources and archaeological excavations have confirmed that there were essential settlements here.

There are many legends about the foundation and origin of Qvareli. According to one of the legends, the king, while hunting in Duruji swamps, enjoyed its surroundings, especially the place where Qvareli is situated now, and ordered: "This is a favoured place, and a village should be settled here." Based on historical sources, in the early centuries (IV century), mountainous Pshavians from the village of Kvara settled in the present territory of Qvareli; The settlers from Kvara were called Kvarlelis, and this name was also chosen for the settlement. Subsequently, this name underwent a change, and finally, the toponymal Qvareli was formed.

== Administrative divisions and population ==
There is one town and 21 villages in Kvareli municipality.

- Kvareli administrative unit – Kvareli
- Administrative unit of Mtisdziri – Mtisdziri village
- Balghojiani administrative unit – Balghojiani village
- Akhalsopeli administrative unit – villages: Akhalsopeli, Tkhilistskaro, Shorokhi, Satskhene, Tivi
- Chikaani administrative unit – villages: Chikaani, Zinobiani, Chantliskure
- Kuchatni administrative unit – villages: Kuchatani, Sanavardo, Tsitskanaantseri
- Gavazi administrative unit – Gavazi village
- Administrative unit of Shilda – village Shilda
- Eniseli administrative unit – Eniseli village
- Sabue administrative unit – villages: Sabue, Almati
- Administrative unit of Gremi – villages: Gremi, Shakriani, Grdzelichala.

The municipality is home to almost whole of Georgia's Avar community – 973 residents (3.26%) of the Kvareli municipality were counted as Avars in the 2014 census, while Georgia total has 1060 Avars, making the municipality's share 91.8%. Three villages – Shorokhi (94%), Chantliskure (88.13%) and Tivi (68.81%) are Avar-majority. In addition, the village of Zinobiani is home to Georgia's Udi community – 164 out of 174 (94.25%) of Georgia's Udis live in the village, which is about evenly split between Udis and Georgians.

== Politics ==
Kvareli Municipal Assembly (Georgian: ყვარლის საკრებულო) is a representative body in Kvareli Municipality. currently consisting of 27 members. The council is assembled into session regularly, to consider subject matters such as code changes, utilities, taxes, Municipal budget, oversight of Municipal government and more. The Municipal Assembly and Mayor are elected every four years. The last election was held in October 2021.

Party	2017	2021	Current Municipal Assembly
Georgian Dream	20	19	
United National Movement	4	7	
For Georgia		1	
Alliance of Patriots	1		
European Georgia	1		
Labour Party	1		
Total	27	27	

== Geography and climate ==
Kvareli Municipality is bordered by three administrative municipalities (Telavi Municipality, Gurjaani Municipality, Lagodekhi Municipality) and the Autonomous Republic of Dagestan. The area of the municipality is 1000.8 km^{2}. Agricultural fields occupy 80,266 ha (36%), and the total area covered by forest is 58,600 ha (27%).

Qvareli municipality's territory belongs to the moderately humid subtropical climate region. In the lowlands, at 1000–1200 meters above sea level, moderately cold winters and warm summers develop; the average annual air temperature is 8–9 °C. At 1700–1800 meters above sea level, cold winters and long cold summers are observed, and the average annual air temperature is 5–6 °C. Above 1800 meters, the average annual air temperature drops down to 3–4 °C. The average annual rainfall varies from 795 mm to 938 mm, depending on the zones. The maximum precipitation occurs in May, and the minimum in January.

== Education ==
There are 21 public, one private school and 21 kindergartens, one nursery and three alternative kindergartens in the municipality. The number of schoolchildren is 3350.

One thousand one hundred children are enrolled in kindergartens.

There are seven libraries (6 rural, one urban), one student youth centre and seven music schools operating in the municipality.

== Culture ==
=== Theatre ===
The People's Theater, named after the founder and reformer of Georgian theatre Kote Marjanishvili operates in Qvareli, where amateur actors are mainly staff.

=== Festivals and public holidays ===
Important traditional events of Qvareli municipality
Event	date	Description
"Iliaoba"	8 November	"Iliaoba" is an important public holiday celebrated almost every year on 8 November since 1937.

== Sport ==
By 2022, the sports school will have nine departments: volleyball, handball, basketball, freestyle wrestling, judo, Georgian wrestling, boxing, karate and chess. About 600 student-athletes are involved in 9 sports departments. World champion Zurab Iakobishvili was brought up in Qvareli sports school.

== Economy ==
Agriculture, the main viticulture, is well developed in Qvareli municipality. The main branch of agriculture provides 80% of the income from all agricultural production. Agricultural fields occupy 35,945 ha. Animal husbandry, poultry farming, etc., are also developed in the municipality's territory. Winemaking is intensively developing; many wineries are popping up here. Here is the world-famous grape appellation "Kindzmarauli".

== Historical landmarks and sightseeing ==
Ancestral Tower of Ilia Chavchavadze House-Museum

In the municipality, firstly, the village of Gremi should be mentioned, located at an altitude of 480 meters above sea level. It is assumed that the population in the territory of Gremi should have appeared in the Late Bronze Age. Gremi was one of Kakheti's trade-economic and cultural centres during the feudal era. In 1466, Gremi became the capital of the Kingdom of Kakheti. An important architectural monument such as the Archangel Church of Gremi has been preserved in the territory of Gremi. It was built in 1565 by King Levan of Kakheti.

Among the many historical monuments, the ruins of the Church of the Virgin in the village of Shilda, known to the local population as "All Saints" of Bartskhana, are worth mentioning. The old Church of the Virgin of Gavazi (VI century) also exists. The Cathedral of the Resurrection (1574–1605) is located in Eniseli, and a former village of Shikhiani is nearby. On the municipality's territory is the historical city of Nekresi (founded by King Farnajom in the 2nd–1st centuries BC).

Other architectural monuments include:

- Dome church "Kvaratskhoveli" in the village Chikaani (XV-XVII centuries)
- Ruins of the Temple of the Sun from the 3rd millennium and a village called "Nelkarisi" of the same period and others.

=== Cultural facilities, museums and notable historical sites ===
- Ilia Chavchavadze Museum
- Kote Marjanishvili Museum
- Money Museum
- Qvareli Public Theater is named after Kote Marjanishvili
- Gremi Museum
- Qvareli Fortress

== Notable people ==
Prominent people of Qvareli municipality
Photo	name and surname	years	Description
	Ilia Chavchavadze	1837–1907	Georgian public figure, publicist, journalist, politician, writer.
	Kote Marjanishvili	1872–1933	Georgian director, people's artist.
	Mako Safarova-Abashidze	1860–1940	Georgian actress
	Vakhtang Tabliashvili	1914–2002	Georgian director

== Twin towns – sister Municipalities ==
- Municipality of Plungė District Municipality, Republic of Lithuania
- Engure Municipality, Republic of Latvia

== See also ==
- List of municipalities in Georgia (country)
