= Ertatsminda Cathedral =

Cathedral in Kaspi District, Georgia

Coordinates: 41°51′47″N 44°19′30″E

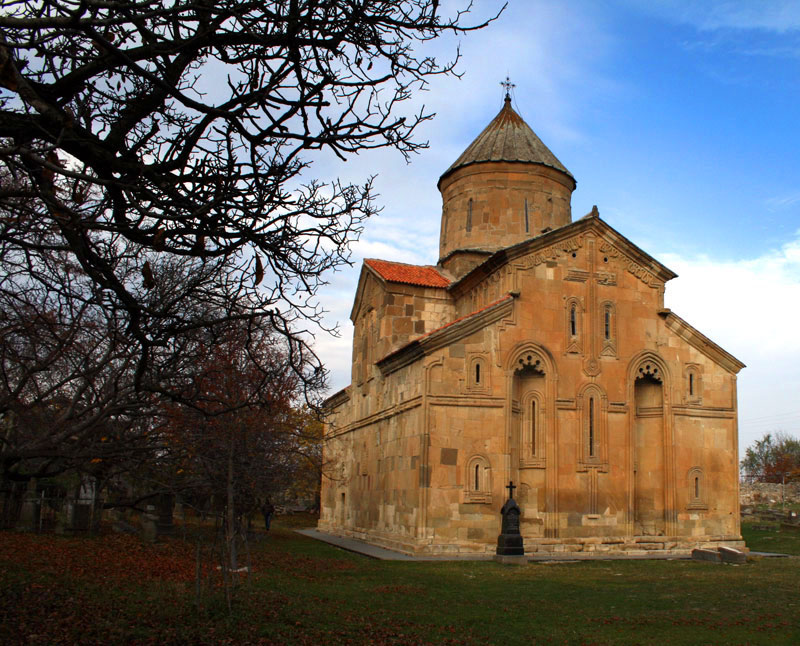
Ertatsminda Cathedral

The Ertatsminda Cathedral of Eustathius of Mtskheta (Georgian: ერთაწმინდის ტაძარი) is a medieval Georgian Orthodox cathedral in Kaspi District, the Shida Kartli region, Georgia. It is situated in the centre of the village Ertatsminda.

The Orthodox cathedral was built in the 13th century. The Ertatsminda cathedral stylistically resembles the other Georgian churches of the 12th-13th Centuries: Ikorta church, Pitareti, Betania, Kvatakhevi and Tsughrughasheni.
