= Georgian Golden Age =

Period during the High Middle Ages in Georgia

The Georgian Golden Age (Georgian: საქართველოს ოქროს ხანა, romanized: sakartvelos okros khana) describes a historical period in the High Middle Ages, spanning from roughly the late 11th to 13th centuries, during which the Kingdom of Georgia reached the peak of its power and development. In addition to military expansion, it was a period of flourishing medieval Georgian architecture, painting and poetry, which was frequently expressed in the development of ecclesiastic art, as well as the creation of the first major works of secular literature.

Lasting more than two centuries, the Golden Age came to a gradual end from persistent invasions of nomads such as Mongols, as well as the spread of Black Death by these same nomadic groups. Georgia further weakened after the Fall of Constantinople, which effectively marked the end of the Eastern Roman Empire, Georgia's traditional ally. As a result of these processes, by the 15th century Georgia fractured and turned into an isolated enclave, largely cut off from Christian Europe and surrounded by hostile Islamic Turco-Iranic neighbors. For Georgia, the Golden Age forms an important part of its status as a once-powerful and ancient nation that maintained relations with Greece and Rome.

== Origins ==
=== David IV ===
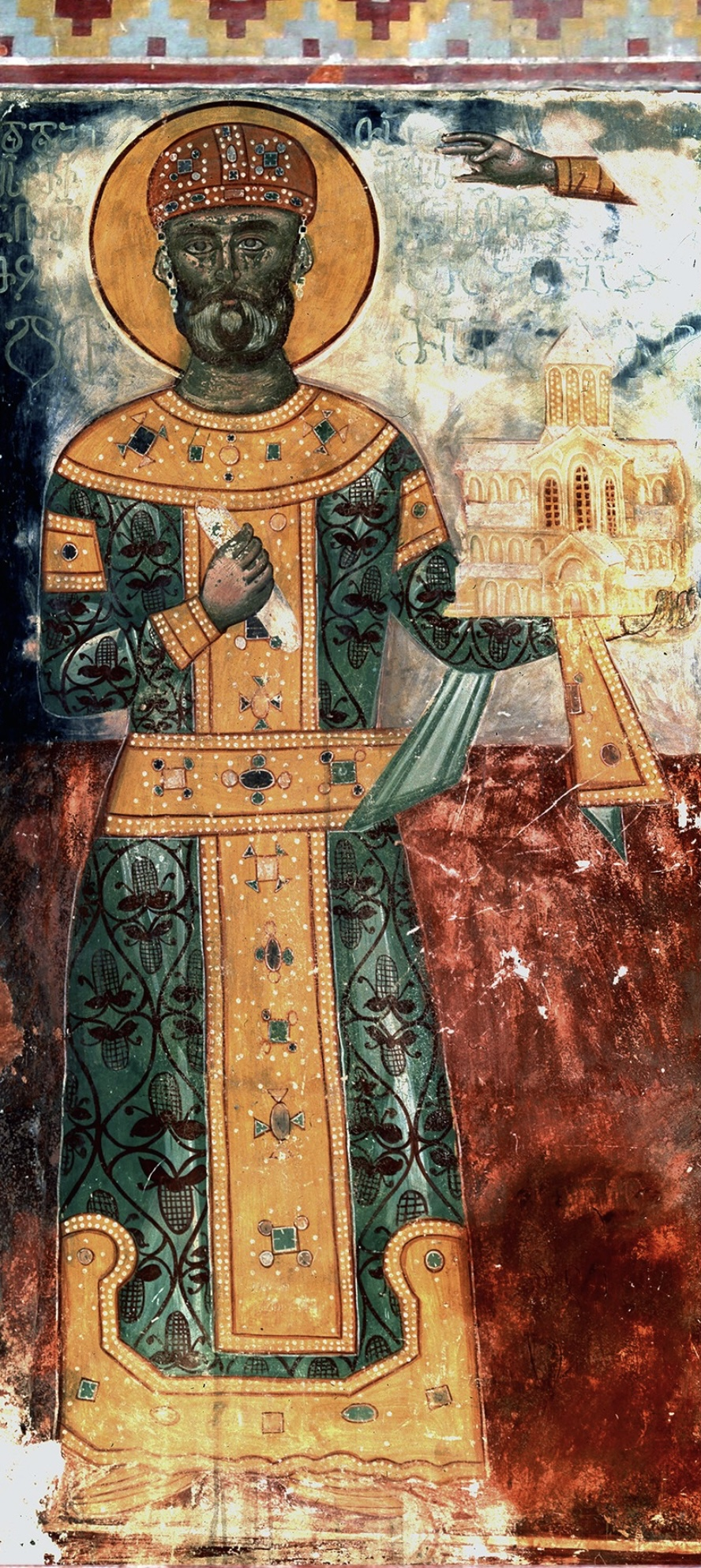
David the Builder, the original architect of the Golden Age. Fresco from Gelati monastery.

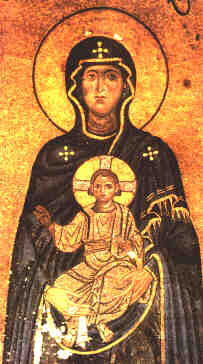
Gelati Theotokos. The use of costly mosaics in church decorations heralded Georgia's imperial ambitions.

The Golden Age began with the reign of David IV ("the builder" or "the great"), the son of George II and Queen Helena, who assumed the throne at age 16 in a period of Great Turkish Invasions. As he came of age under the guidance of his court minister, George of Chqondidi, David IV suppressed the dissent of feudal lords and centralized the power in his hands to effectively deal with foreign threats. In 1121, he decisively defeated much larger Turkish armies during the Battle of Didgori, with fleeing Seljuk Turks being run down by pursuing Georgian cavalry for several days. A huge amount of booty and prisoners were captured by David's army, which had also secured Tbilisi and inaugurated an era of revival.

To highlight his country's higher status, he became the first Georgian king to reject the highly respected titles bestowed by the Eastern Roman Empire, Georgia’s longtime ally, indicating that Georgia would deal with its powerful friend only on a parity basis. With the close family ties between Georgian and Byzantine royalty (Princess Martha of Georgia, aunt of David IV, was once a Byzantine empress consort), by the 11th century as many as 16 Georgian ruling princes and kings had held Byzantine titles, David becoming the last one to do so.

David removed the vestiges of unwanted Eastern influences, which the Georgians considered forced, in favor of the traditional Christian and Byzantine overtones. As part of this effort, he founded the Gelati Monastery, a UNESCO World Heritage Site, which became an important center of scholarship in the Eastern Orthodox Christian world of that time.

David played a personal role in reviving Georgian religious hymnography, composing the Hymns of Repentance (Georgian: გალობანი სინანულისანი, galobani sinanulisani), a sequence of eight free-verse psalms. In this emotional repentance of his sins, David sees himself as reincarnating the Biblical David, with a similar relationship to God and his people. His hymns also share the idealistic zeal of the contemporaneous European crusaders to whom David was a natural ally in his struggle against the Seljuks.

=== Demetrius I and George III ===
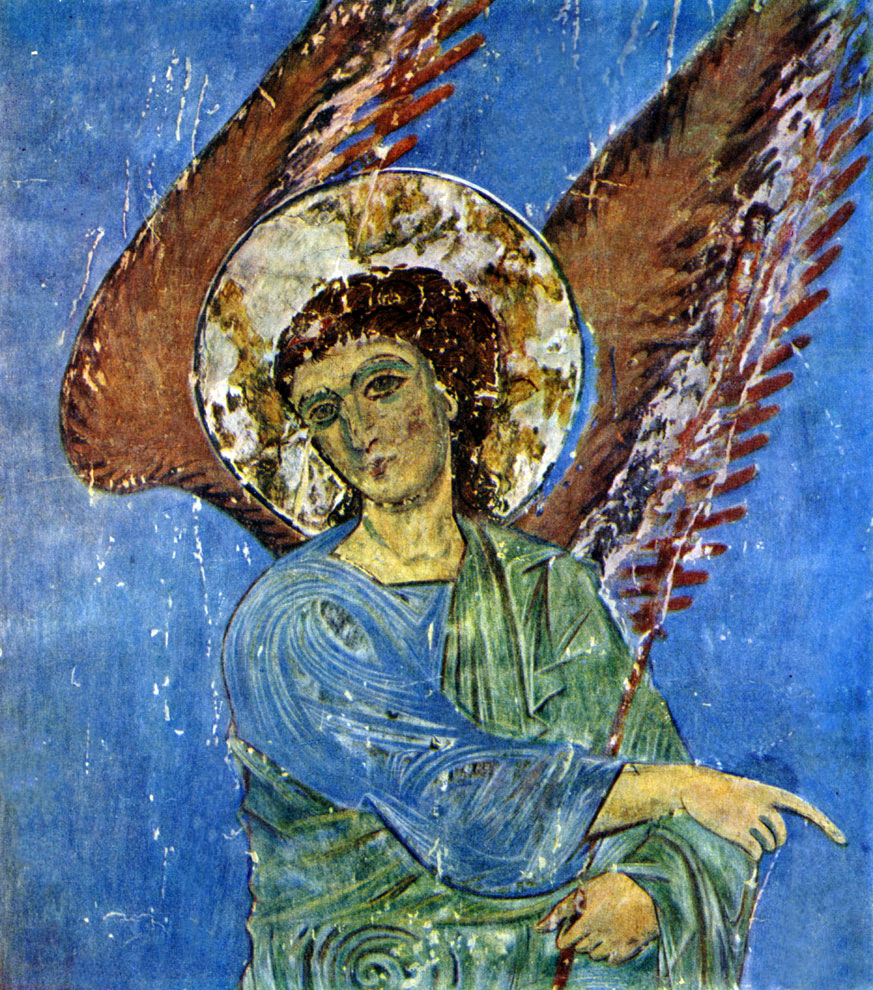
Archangel of Kintsvisi, complete with scarce and expensive natural ultramarine paint, evidences increasing sophistication and resources of Georgian masters following the reign of George III

The kingdom continued to flourish under Demetrius I, the son of David. Although his reign saw a disruptive family conflict related to royal succession, Georgia remained a centralized power with a strong military, with several decisive victories against the Muslims in Ganja, the gates of which were captured by Demetrius and moved as a trophy to Gelati.

A talented poet, Demetrius continued his father's contributions to Georgia's religious polyphony. The most famous of his hymns is "Thou Art a Vineyard", which is dedicated to the Virgin Mary, the patron saint of Georgia, and is still sung in Georgia's churches 900 years after its creation.

Demetrius was succeeded by his son George in 1156, beginning a stage of more offensive foreign policy. In 1156 George launched a successful campaign against the Seljuk sultanate of Ahlat. He freed the important Armenian town of Dvin from Turkish vassalage and was thus welcomed as a liberator in the area. George continued the process of intermingling Georgian royalty with the highest ranks of the Eastern Roman Empire, a testament of which is the marriage of his daughter Rusudan to Manuel Komnenos, the son of Emperor Andronikos I Komnenos.

== Zenith of development under Queen Tamar ==
The successes of her predecessors were built upon by Tamar, daughter of George III, who became the first female ruler of Georgia in her own right and under whose leadership the Georgian state reached the zenith of power and prestige in the Middle Ages. She shielded much of her empire from further Turkish onslaught and successfully pacified internal tensions, including a coup organized by her Russian husband Yury Bogolyubsky, prince of Novgorod. Additionally, she pursued policies that were considered enlightened for her time period, such as abolishing state-sanctioned death penalty and torture.

=== Foreign interventions and dealings in the Holy Land ===
Among the remarkable events of Tamar's reign was the foundation of the empire of Trebizond on the Black Sea in 1204. This state was established in the northeast of the crumbling Byzantine Empire with the help of the Georgian armies, which supported Alexios I of Trebizond and his brother, David Komnenos, both of whom were Tamar's relatives. Alexios and David were fugitive Byzantine princes raised at the Georgian court. According to Tamar's historian, the aim of the Georgian expedition to Trebizond was to punish the Byzantine Emperor Alexios IV Angelos for his confiscation of a shipment of money from Tamar to the monasteries of Antioch and Mount Athos. Tamar's pontic endeavor can also be explained by her desire to take advantage of the Western European Fourth Crusade against Constantinople to set up a friendly state in Georgia's immediate southwestern neighborhood, as well as by the dynastic solidarity to the dispossessed Komnenos family.

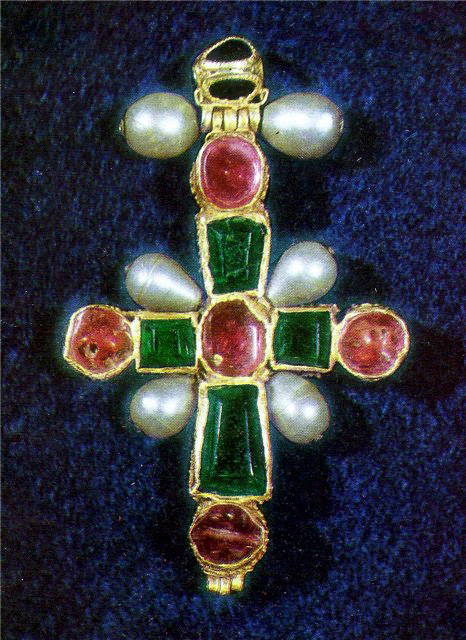
Golden cross of Queen Tamar, composed of rubies, emeralds, and large pearls

The country's power had grown to such extent that in the later years of Tamar's rule, the kingdom was primarily concerned with the protection of the Georgian monastic centers in the Holy Land, eight of which were listed in Jerusalem. Saladin's biographer Bahā' ad-Dīn ibn Šaddād reports that, after the Ayyubid conquest of Jerusalem in 1187, Tamar sent envoys to Saladin to request that the confiscated possessions of the Georgian monasteries in Jerusalem be returned. Saladin's response is not recorded, but Tamar's efforts seem to have been successful. Ibn Šaddād furthermore claims that Tamar outbid Byzantine Emperor Isaac II Angelos in her efforts to obtain the relics of the True Cross, offering 200,000 gold pieces to Saladin who had taken the relics as booty at the battle of Hattin – to no avail, however.

Jacques de Vitry, the contemporary Patriarch of Jerusalem, writes:

There is also in the East another Christian people, who are very warlike and valiant in battle, being strong in body and powerful in the countless numbers of their warriors...Being entirely surrounded by infidel nations...these men are called Georgians, because they especially revere and worship St. George...Whenever they come on pilgrimage to the Lord's Sepulchre, they march into the Holy City...without paying tribute to anyone, for the Saracens dare in no wise molest them...

=== Commerce and culture ===
With flourishing commercial centers under Georgia's control, industry and commerce brought new wealth to the country and Tamar's court. Tribute extracted from the neighbors and war booty added to the royal treasury, giving rise to the saying that "the peasants were like nobles, the nobles like princes, and the princes like kings."

Tamar's reign marked the continuation of artistic development in the country commenced by her predecessors. While her contemporary Georgian chronicles continued to enshrine Christian morality, the religious theme started to lose its earlier dominant position to the highly original secular literature. This trend culminated in an epic written by Georgia's national poet Rustaveli, The Knight in the Panther's Skin (Vepkhistq'aosani). Revered in Georgia as the greatest achievement of native literature, the poem celebrates the Medieval humanistic ideals of chivalry, friendship and courtly love.

== Nomadic invasions and the gradual decline of Georgia ==
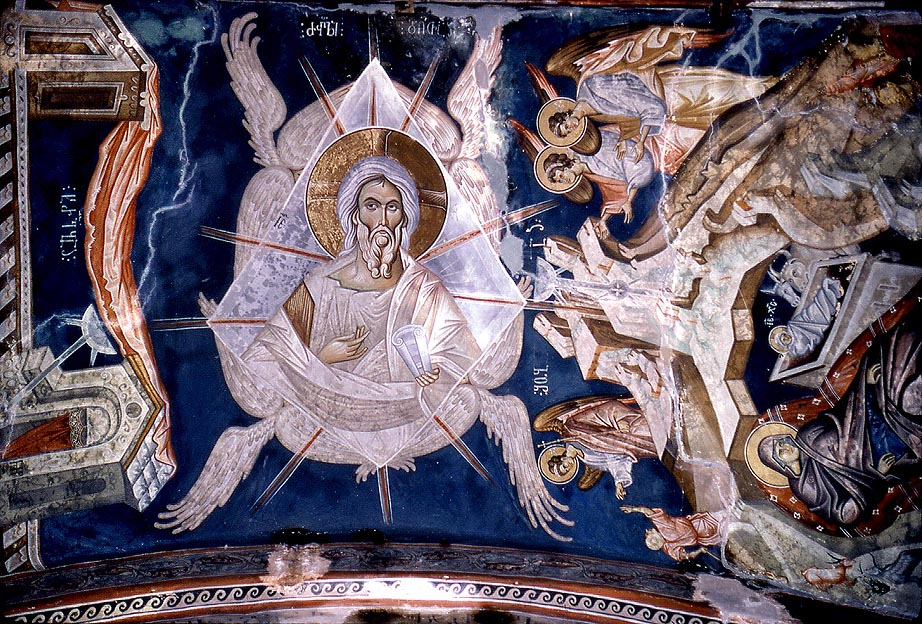
Despite setbacks at the hands of Mongols, Georgia continued to produce cultural landmarks, such as these frescoes at Ubisi by Damiane - one of Georgia's distinctive medieval artists.

Around the time when Mongols invaded the Slavic northeast of Europe, the nomadic armies simultaneously pushed down south to Georgia. George IV, son of Queen Tamar, put aside his preparations in support of the Fifth Crusade and concentrated on fighting the invaders, but the Mongol onslaught was too strong to overcome. Georgians suffered heavy losses in the war, and the king was severely wounded. As a result, George became handicapped and died prematurely at age 31.

George's sister Rusudan assumed the throne, but she was too inexperienced and her country too weakened to push out the nomads. In 1236 a prominent Mongol commander Chormaqan led a massive army against Georgia and its vassals, forcing Queen Rusudan to flee to the west, leaving eastern Georgia in the hands of noblemen who eventually made peace with the Mongols and agreed to pay tribute; those who resisted were subject to complete annihilation. The Mongol armies chose not to cross the natural barrier of Likhi Range in pursuit of Rusudan, sparing western Georgia of the widespread rampages. Later, Rusudan attempted to gain support from Pope Gregory IX but without success. In 1243 Georgia was finally forced to acknowledge the Great Khan as its overlord.

Perhaps no Mongol invasion devastated Georgia as much as the decades of anti-Mongol struggle that took place in the country. The first anti-Mongol uprising started in 1259 under the leadership of David VI and lasted for almost 30 years. The anti-Mongol strife continued without much success under Kings Demetrius the Self-Sacrificer, who was executed by the Mongols, and David VIII.

Georgia finally saw a period of revival unknown since the Mongol invasions under King George V the Brilliant. A far-sighted monarch, George V managed to play on the decline of the Ilkhanate, stopped paying tribute to the Mongols, restored the pre-1220 state borders of Georgia, and returned the Empire of Trebizond into Georgia's sphere of influence. Under him, Georgia established close international commercial ties, mainly with the Byzantine Empire—to which George V had family ties—but also with the great European maritime republics, Genoa and Venice. George V achieved the restoration of several Georgian monasteries in Jerusalem to the Georgian Orthodox Church and gained free passage for Georgian pilgrims to the Holy Land. The widespread use of the Jerusalem cross in Medieval Georgia—an inspiration for the modern national flag of Georgia—is thought to date to the reign of George V.

The death of George V, the last of great kings of unified Georgia, precipitated an irreversible decline of the kingdom. The following decades were marked by Black Death, which was spread by the nomads, as well as numerous invasions under the leadership of Tamerlane, who devastated the country's economy, population, and urban centers. After the fall of Byzantium, Georgia definitively turned into an isolated, fractured Christian enclave, a relic of the faded East Roman epoch surrounded by hostile Turco-Iranic neighbors.

Georgia's decline resulted in "emasculation" of its image in Russian Imperial perceptions, which systematically overlooked the nation's origins and instead portrayed it as a vulnerable, feminine "orient" in need of imperial protection.

=== Artistic inheritance ===
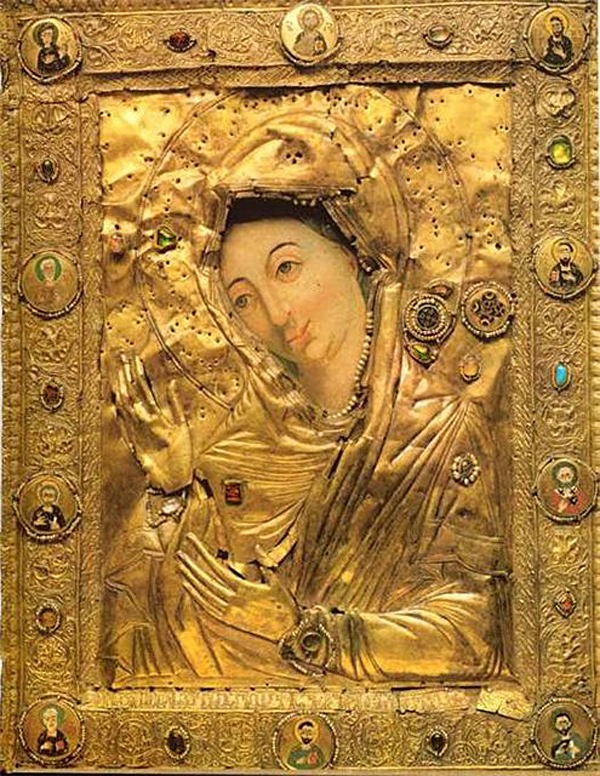
Golden Theotokos of Khobi Monastery, with some precious stones stolen by the communists

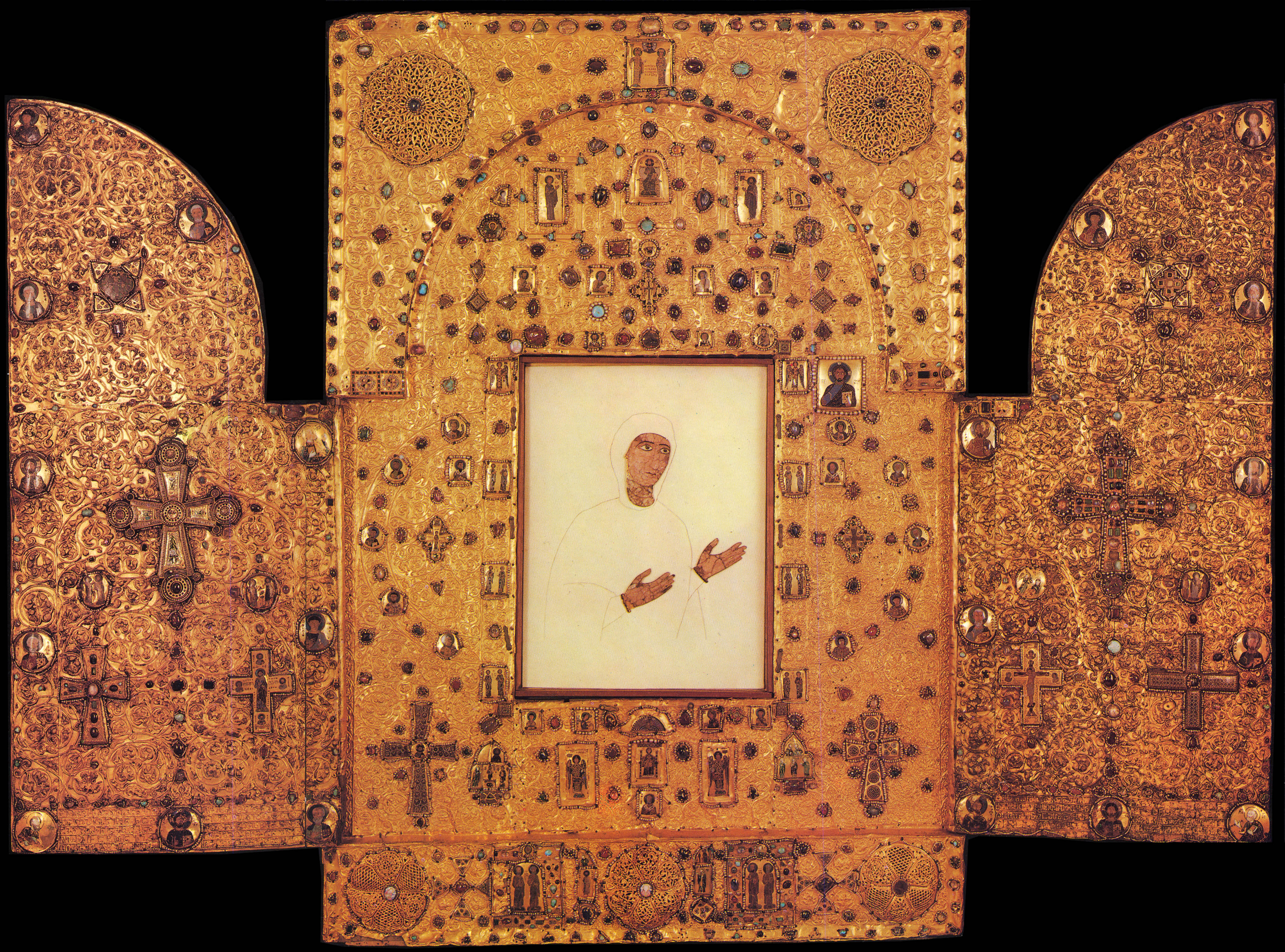
Triptych of Khakhuli

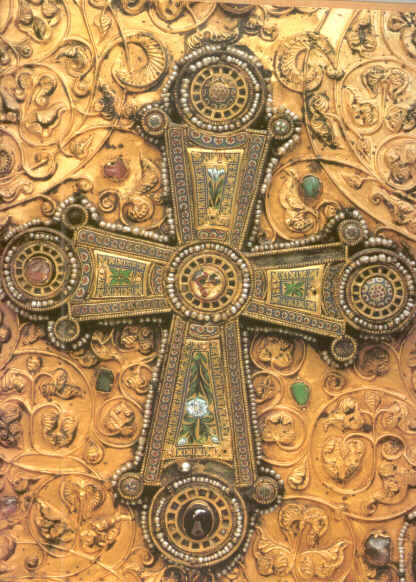
Detail of the Khakhuli Triptych

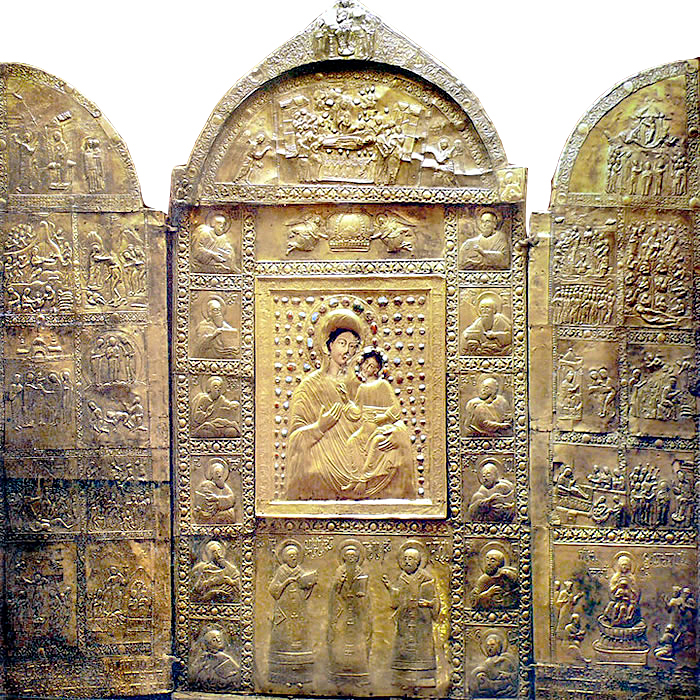
Atskuri Triptych

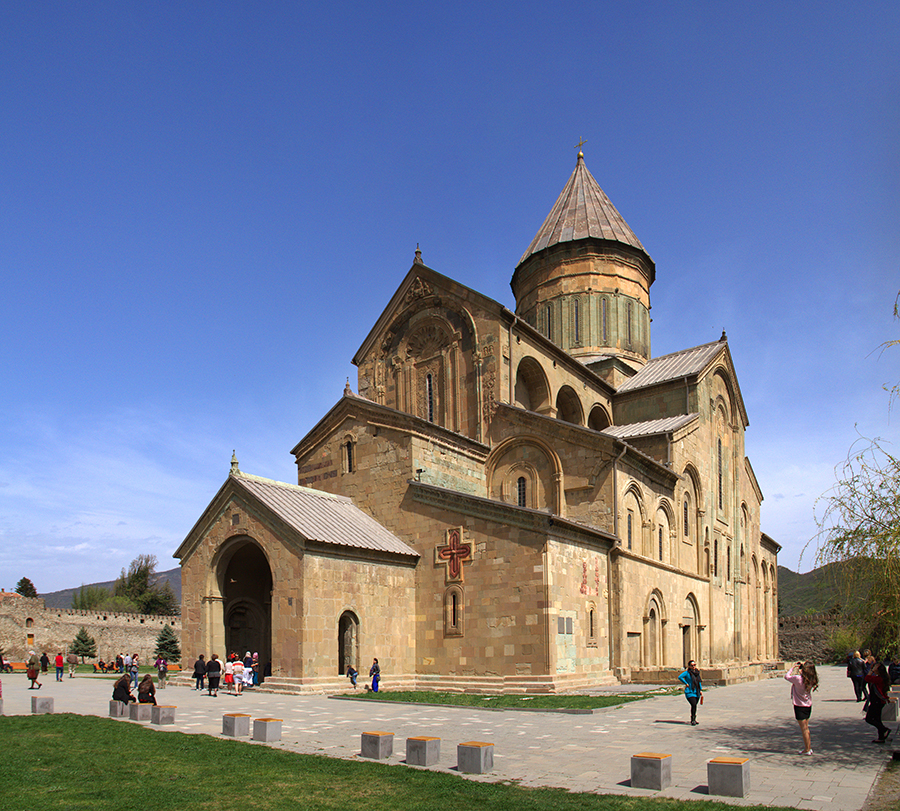
The construction of Svetitskhoveli Cathedral in Mtskheta, now a UNESCO World Heritage Site, was initiated in the 1020s by George I.

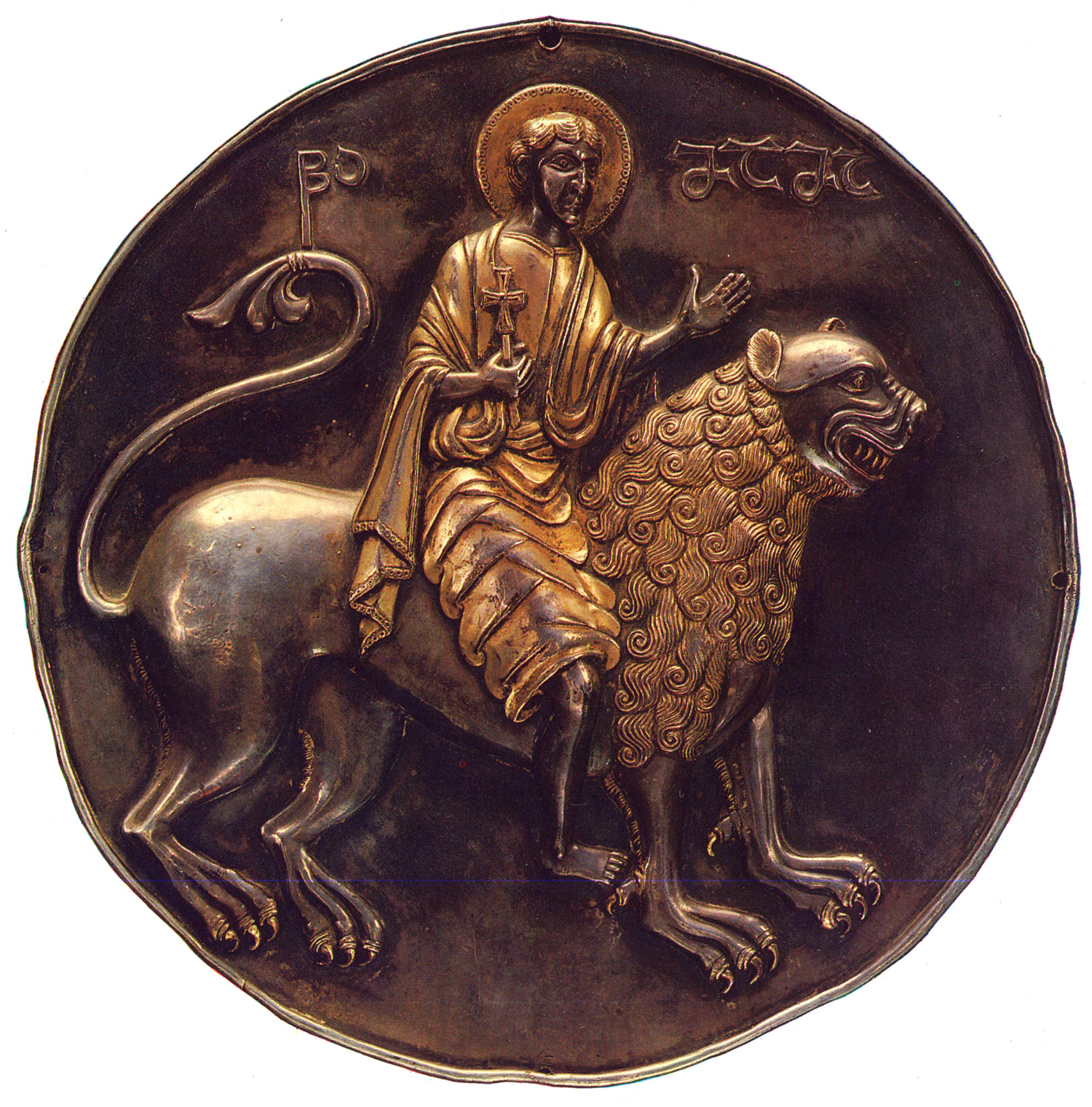
Georgian tondo commemorating Roman martyr Mammes of Caesarea

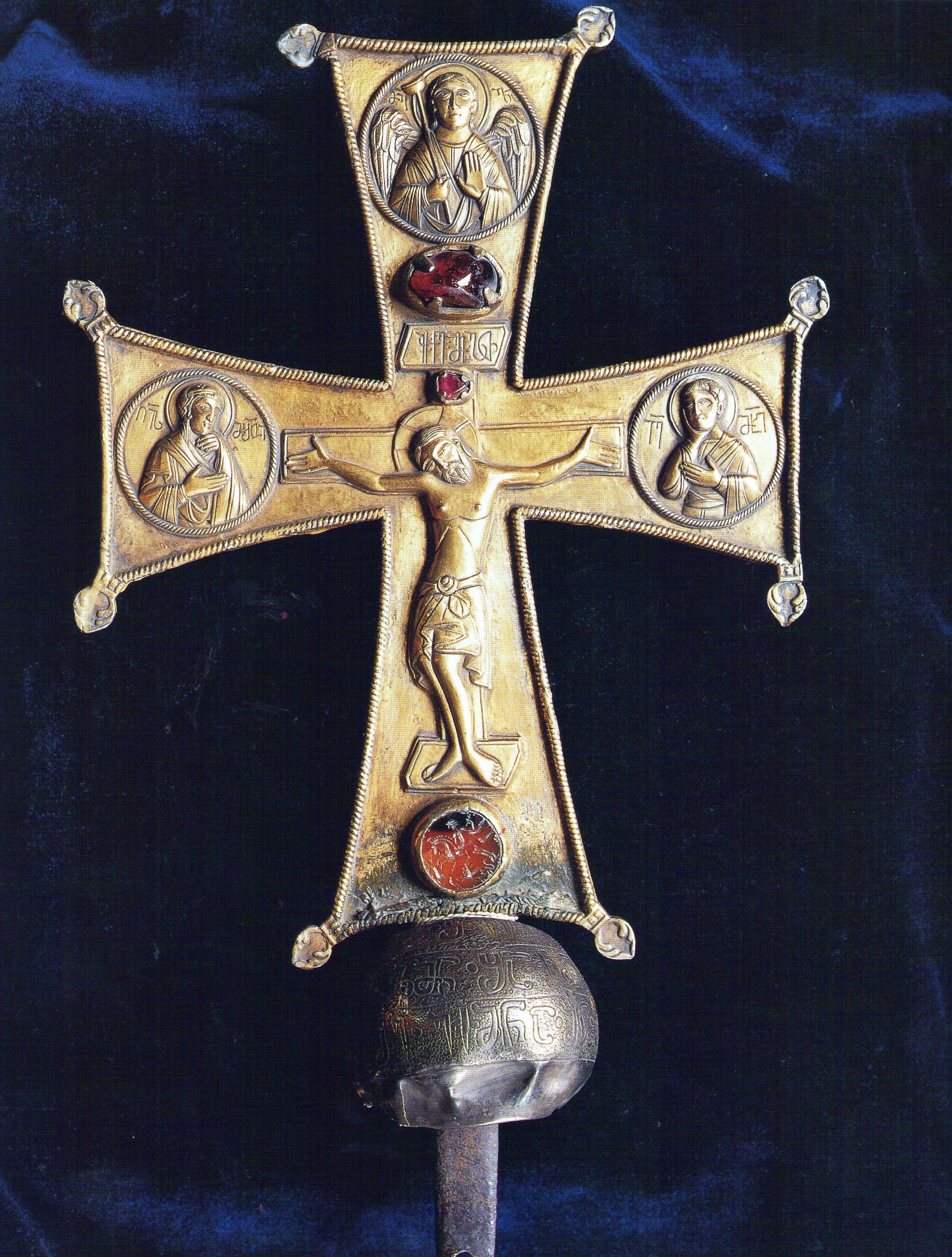
David IV's processional cross

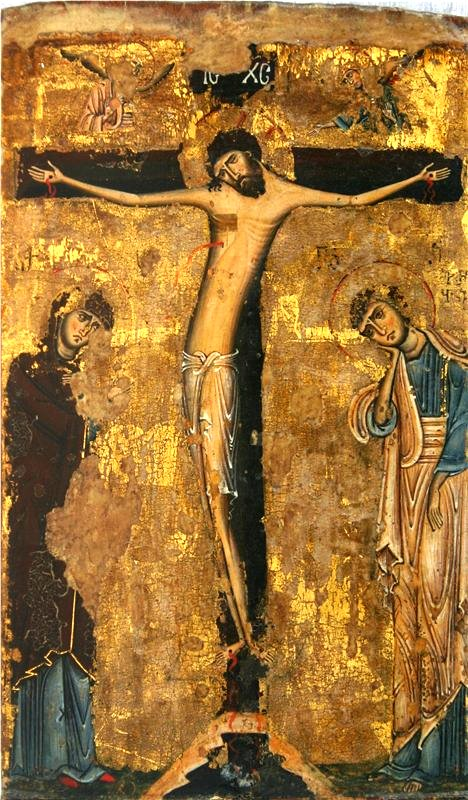
Crucifixion from Mestia

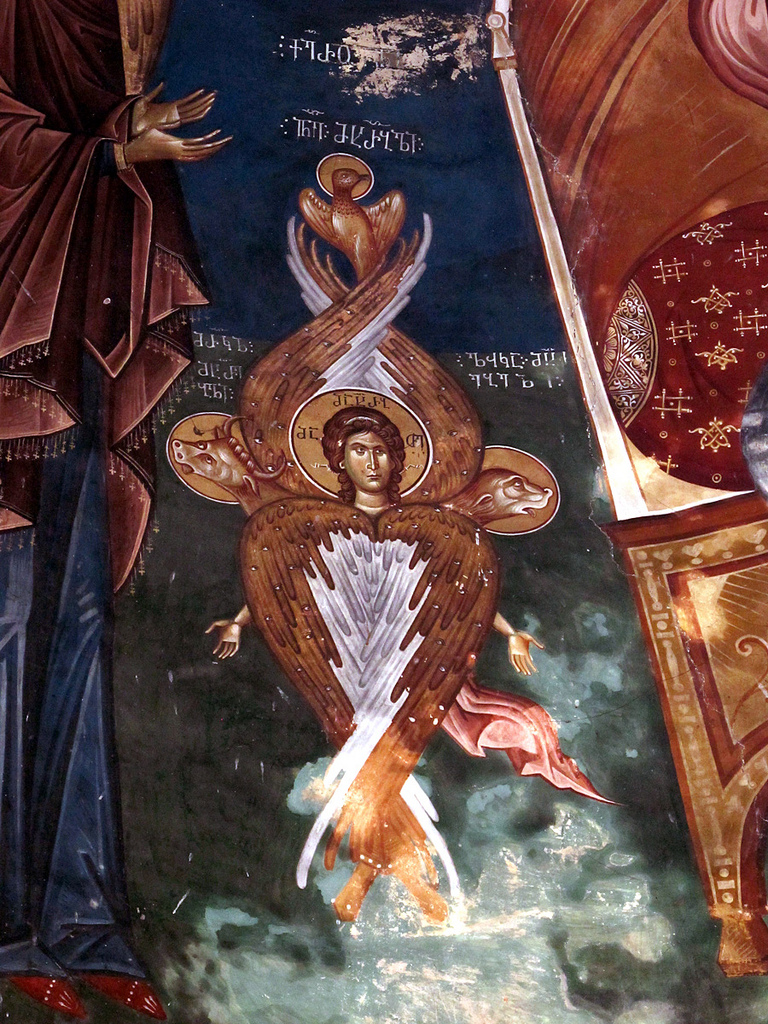
Fresco from Ubisi, Georgia

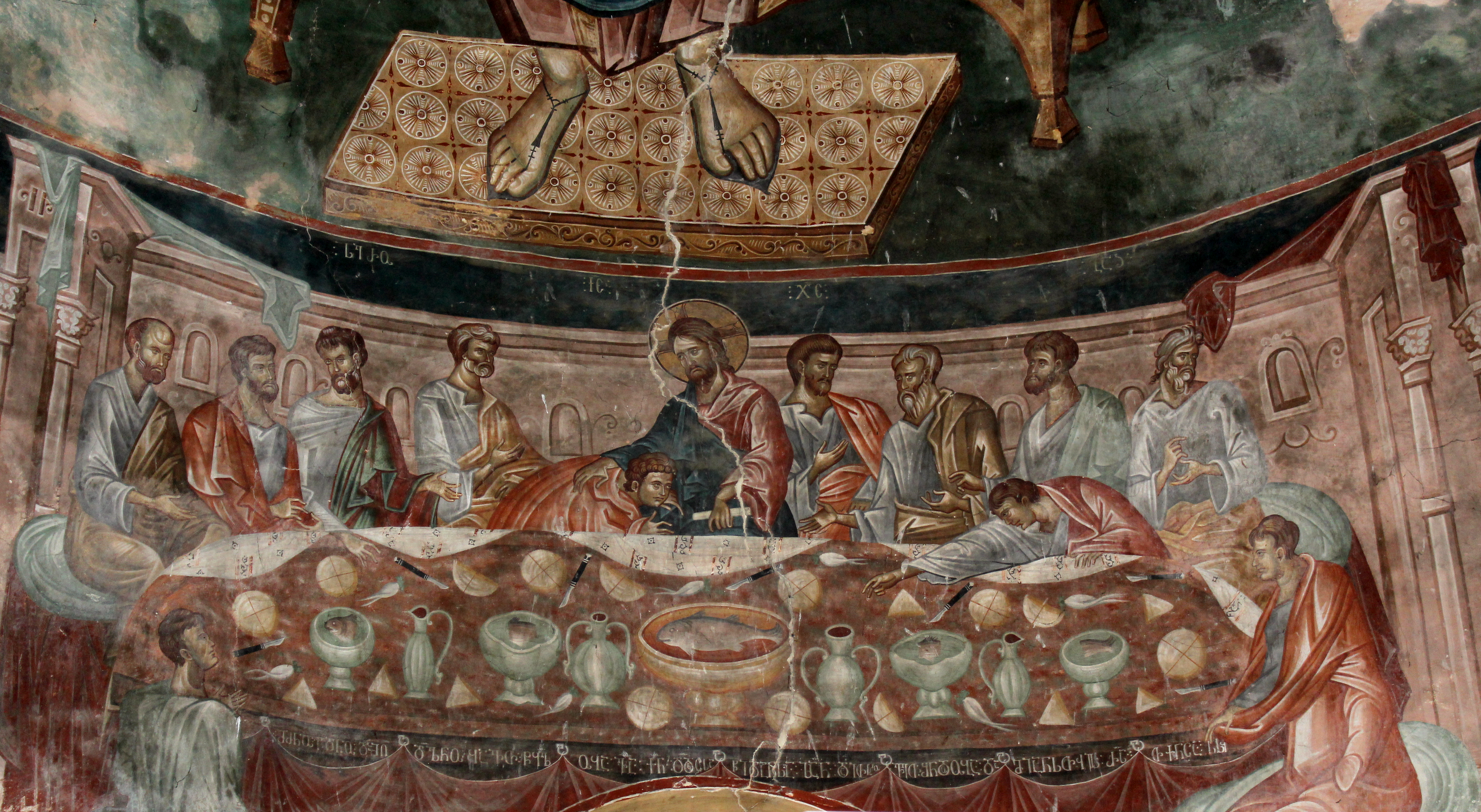
The Last Supper of Ubisi

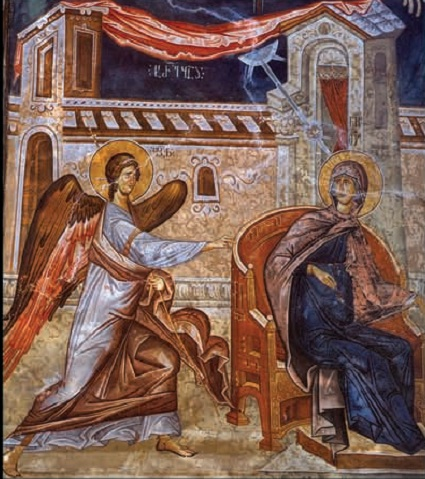
Annunciation of Ubisi

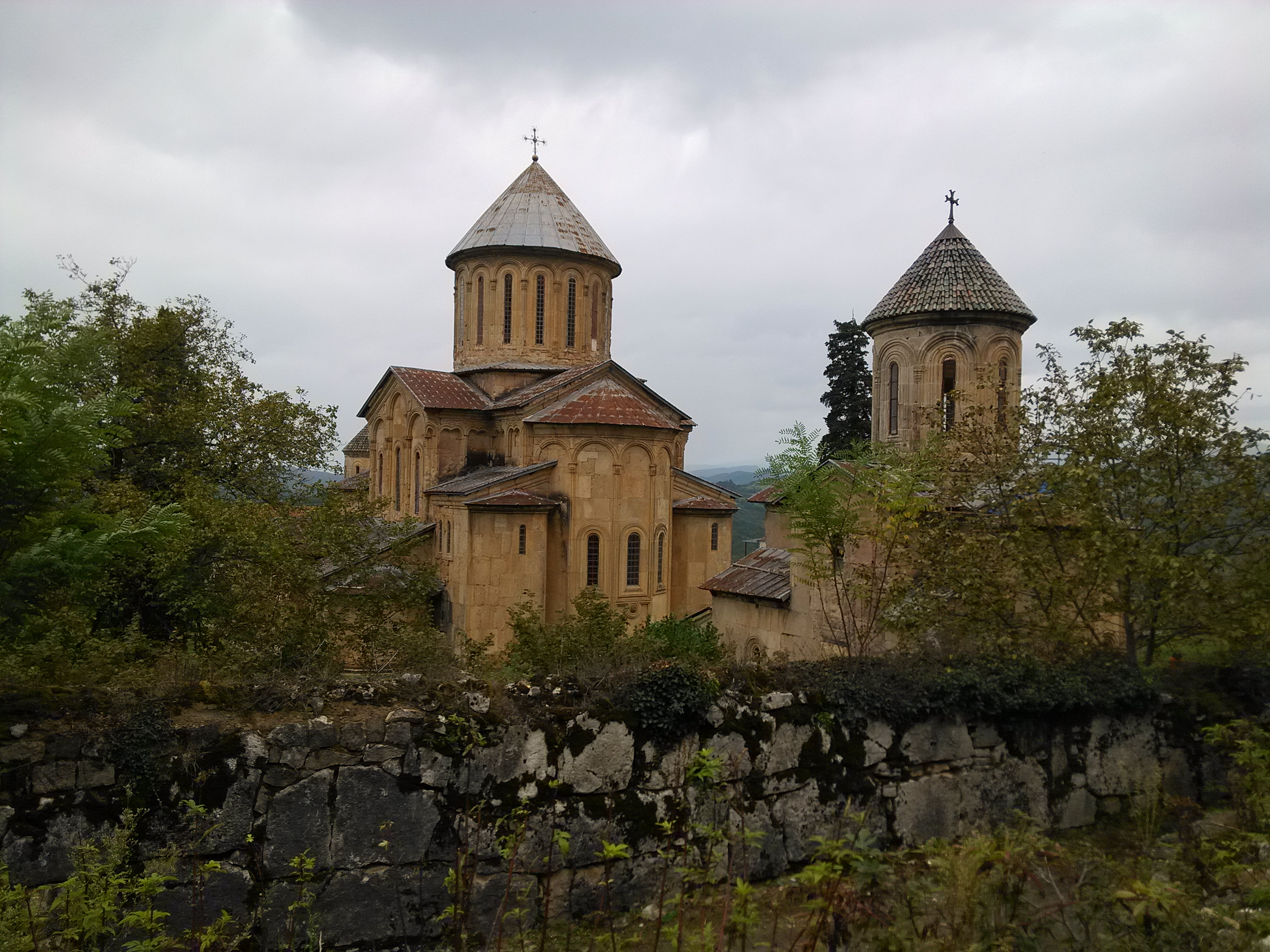
Gelati Monastery, a UNESCO World Heritage Site

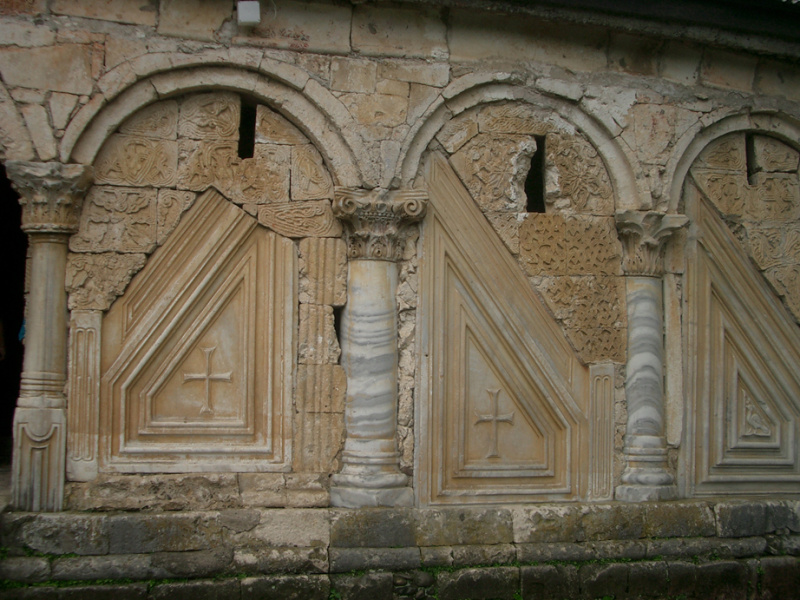
Walls of the Khobi Monastery showing strong Roman influence

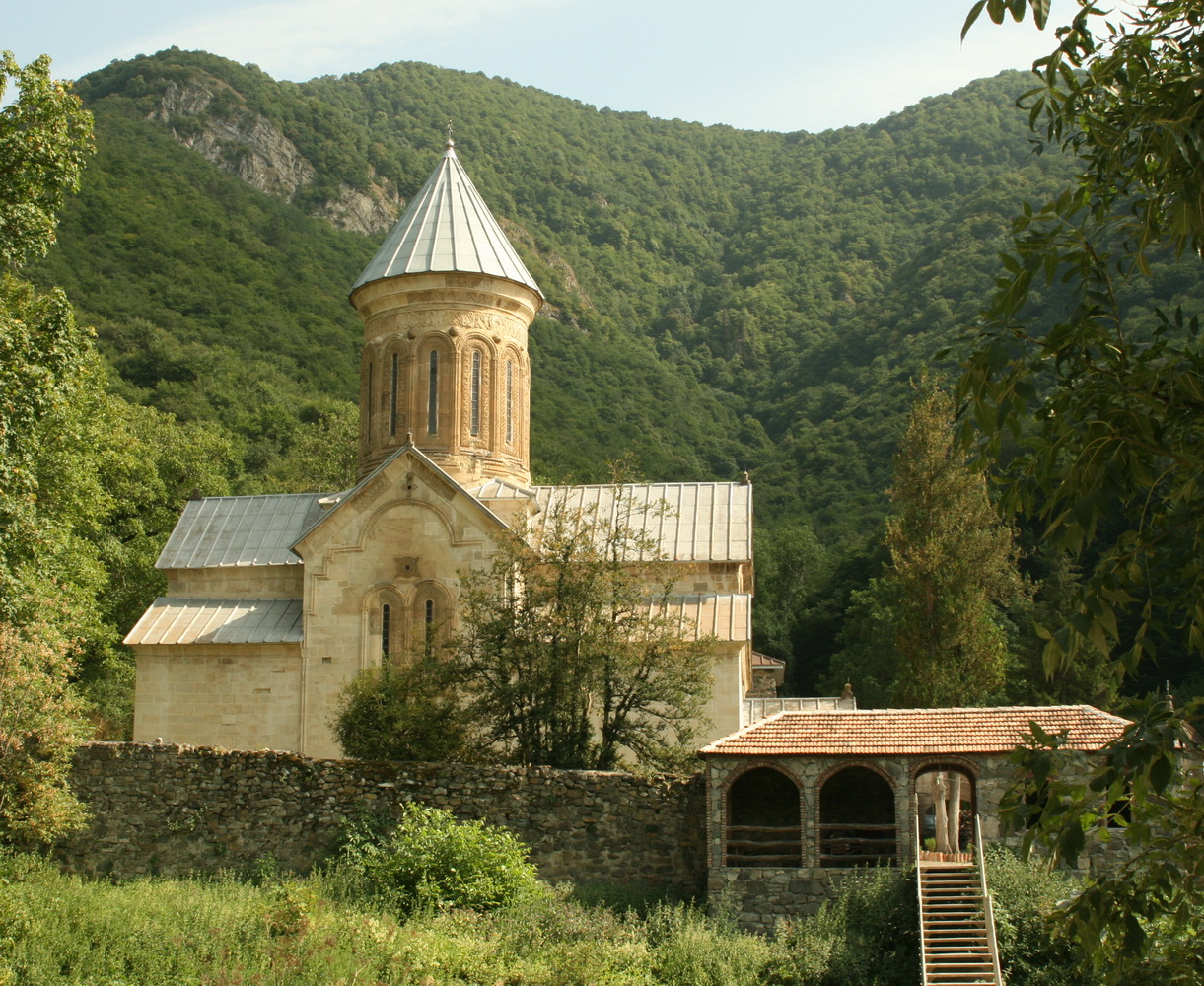
Kvatakhevi monastery

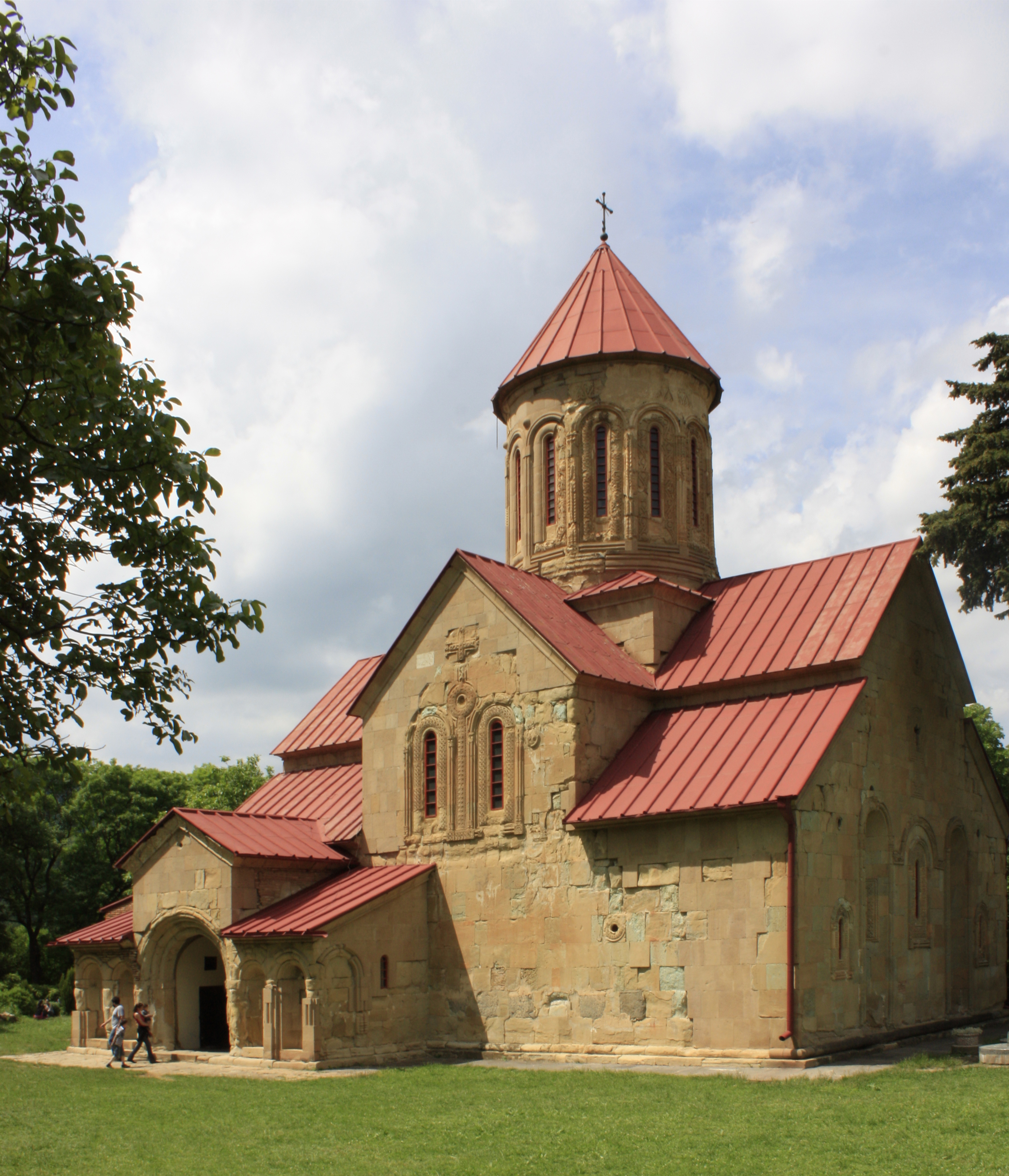
Betania Monastery

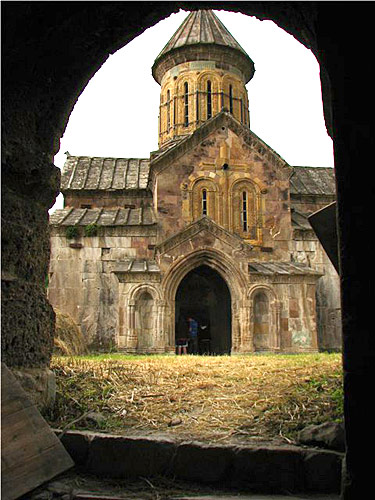
Pitareti Monastery

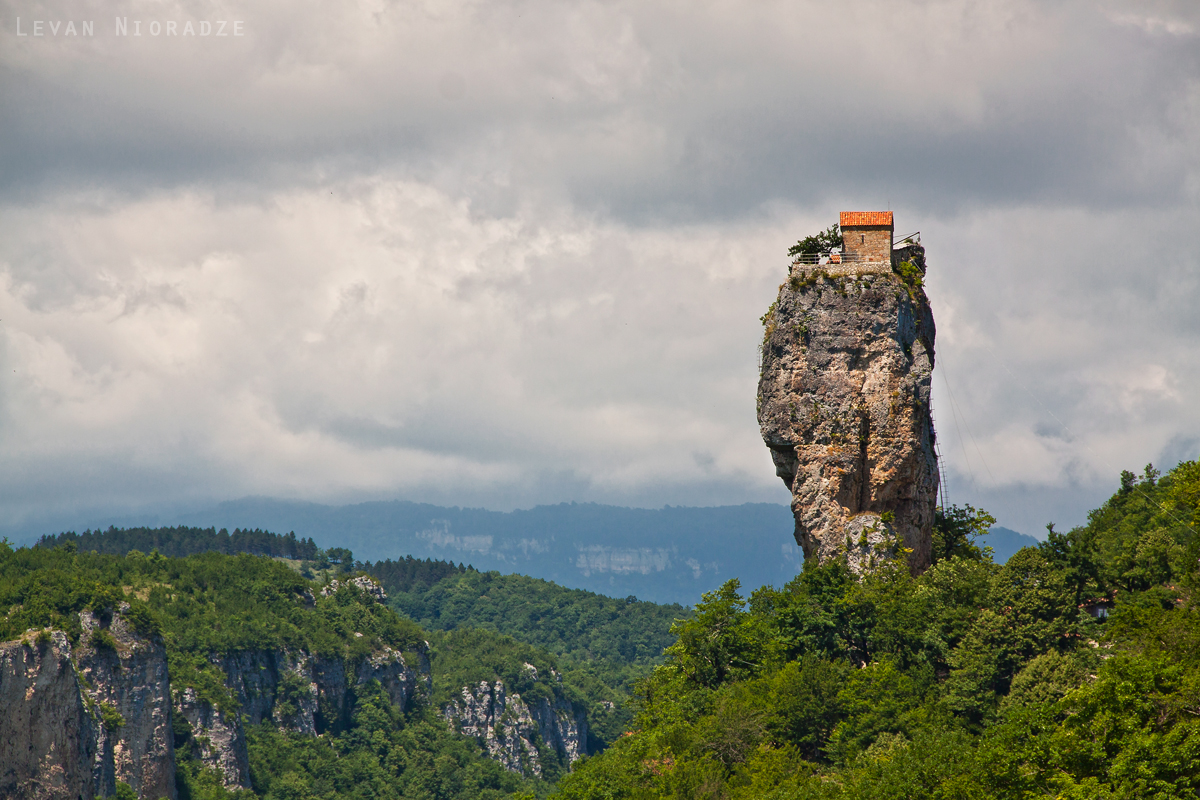
Katskhi Pillar
