= Tsughrughasheni Church =

Church building in Bolnisi Municipality, Georgia

Tsughrughasheni Church წუღრუღაშენის ეკლესია
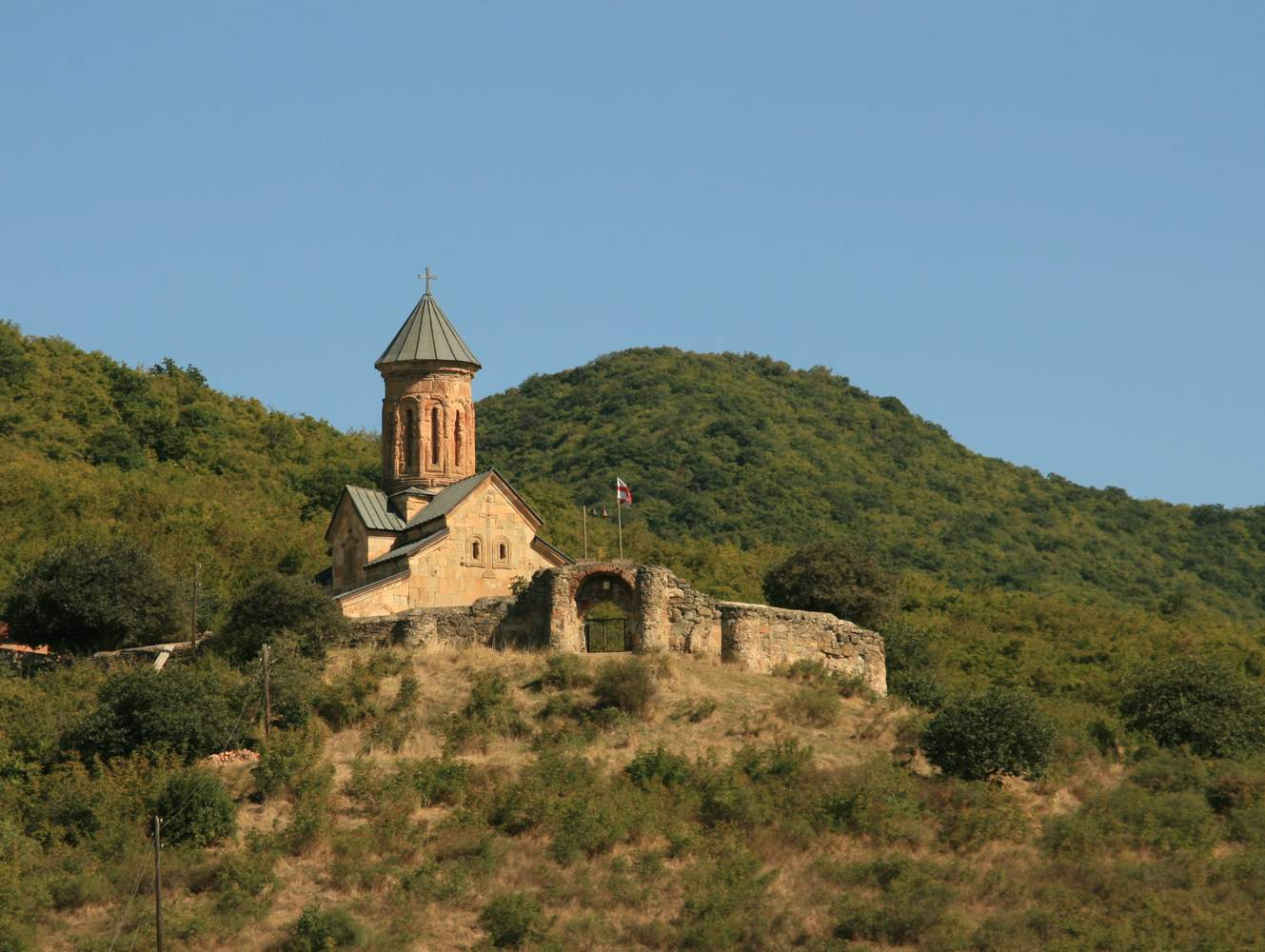
- Tsughrughasheni church and fortification wall.

- Location within Georgia

Religion
- Affiliation: Georgian Orthodox Church
- District: Bolnisi District
- Region: Caucasus
- Status: Active

Location
- Location: Located approximately 2 km from Bolnisi Sioni Basilica, Bolnisi District, Kvemo Kartli Province (Mkhare), Georgia
- Coordinates: 41.3803°N 44.5294°E

Architecture
- Type: Georgian; Church
- Founder: King George IV Lasha of the Bagrationi dynasty
- Funded by: King George IV Lasha of the Bagrationi dynasty
- Groundbreaking: 1212
- Completed: 1222

Tsughrughasheni (Georgian: წუღრუღაშენის ეკლესია) is a Georgian Orthodox church located in the Bolnisi District of Georgia. It is situated approximately 2 kilometres from Bolnisi Sioni basilica, on the right bank of the Bolnisistsqali River. The church was built in 1212–1222 supposedly by King George IV Lasha of the Bagrationi dynasty.

The Tsughrughasheni church resembles stylistically the other Georgian churches from the 12th to 13th century – Betania, Kvatakhevi, Pitareti – but it is smaller than those and has a higher cupola. The plan of the church is right-angled. The church is rich with the Georgian traditional ornaments adorned.

== Gallery ==
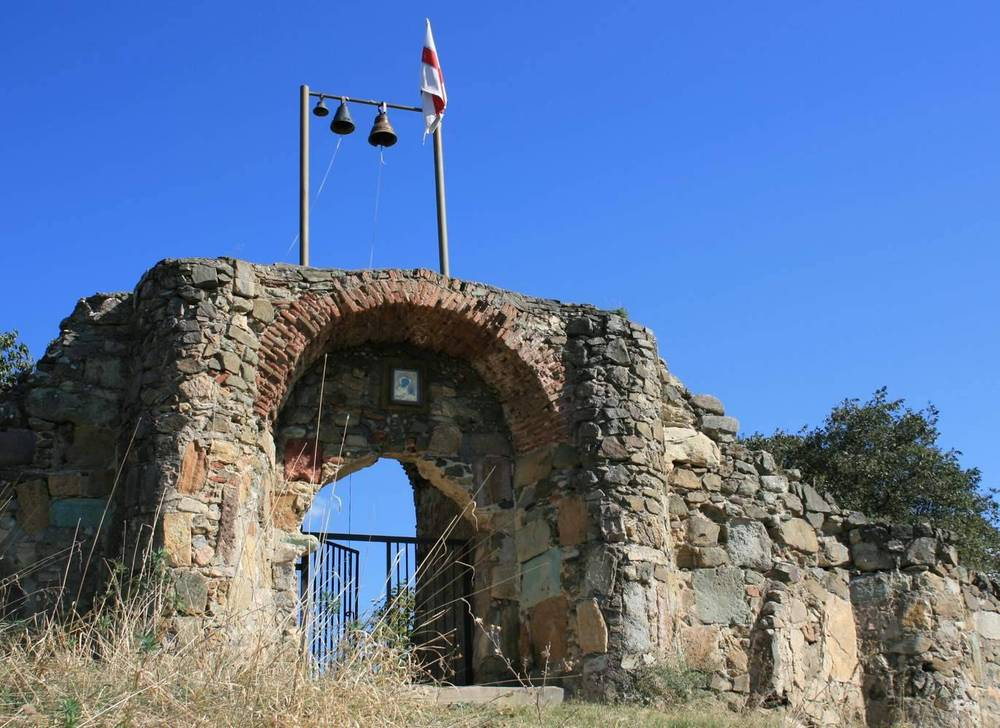
Church gate

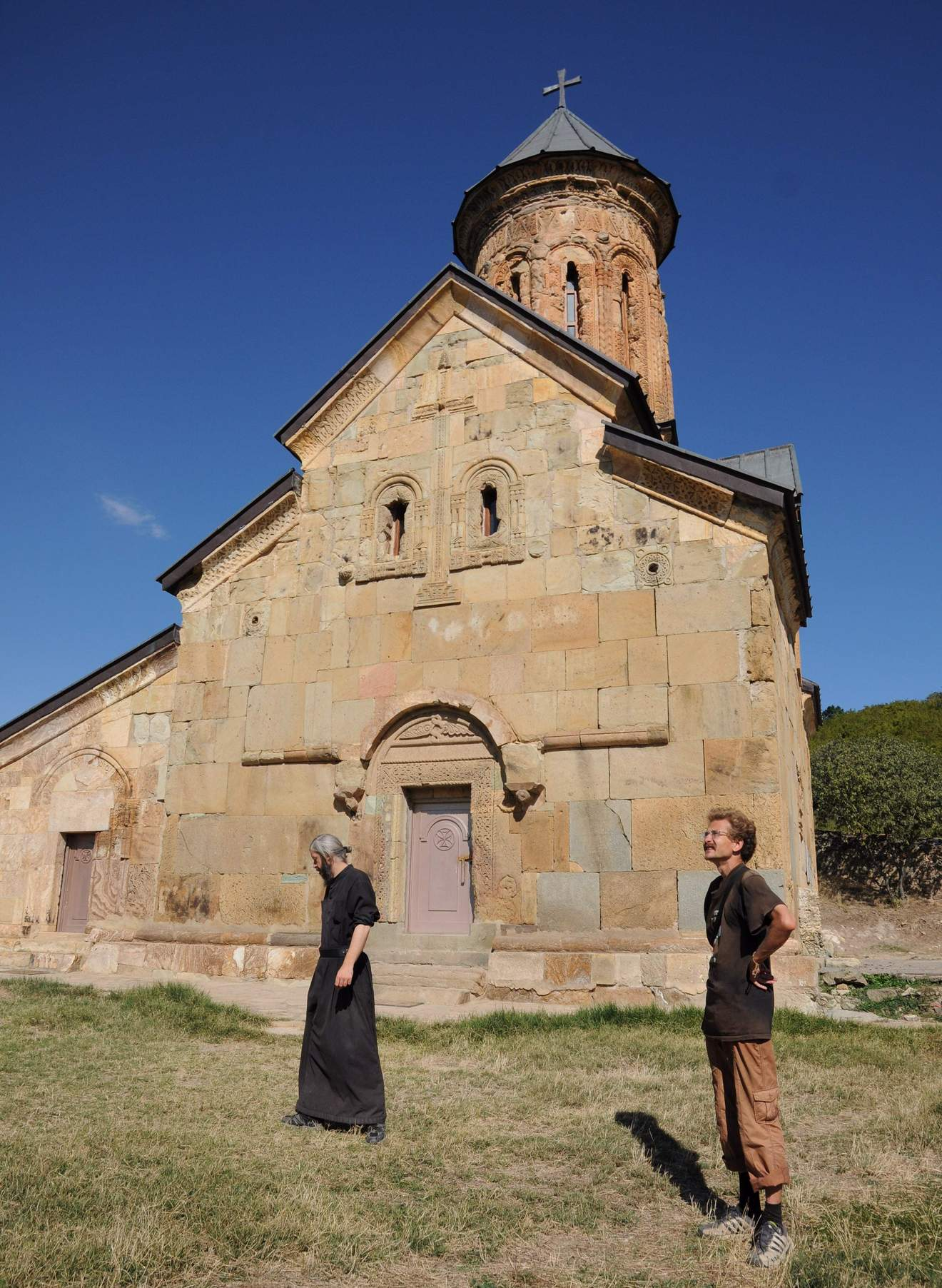
Tsughrughasheni Church

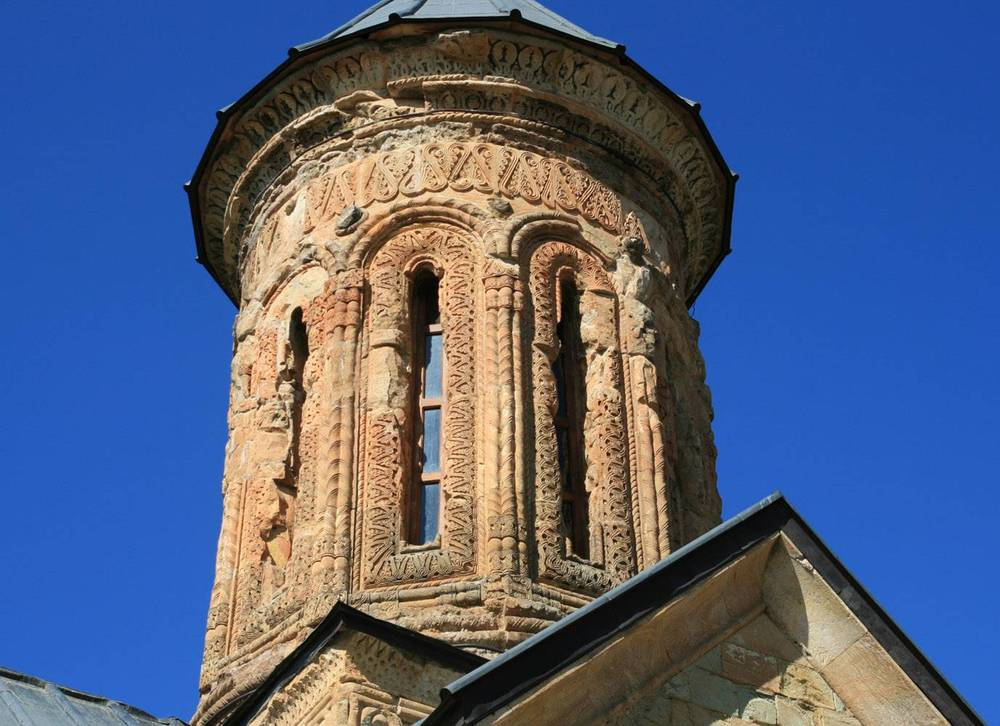
Exterior detail of the drum.

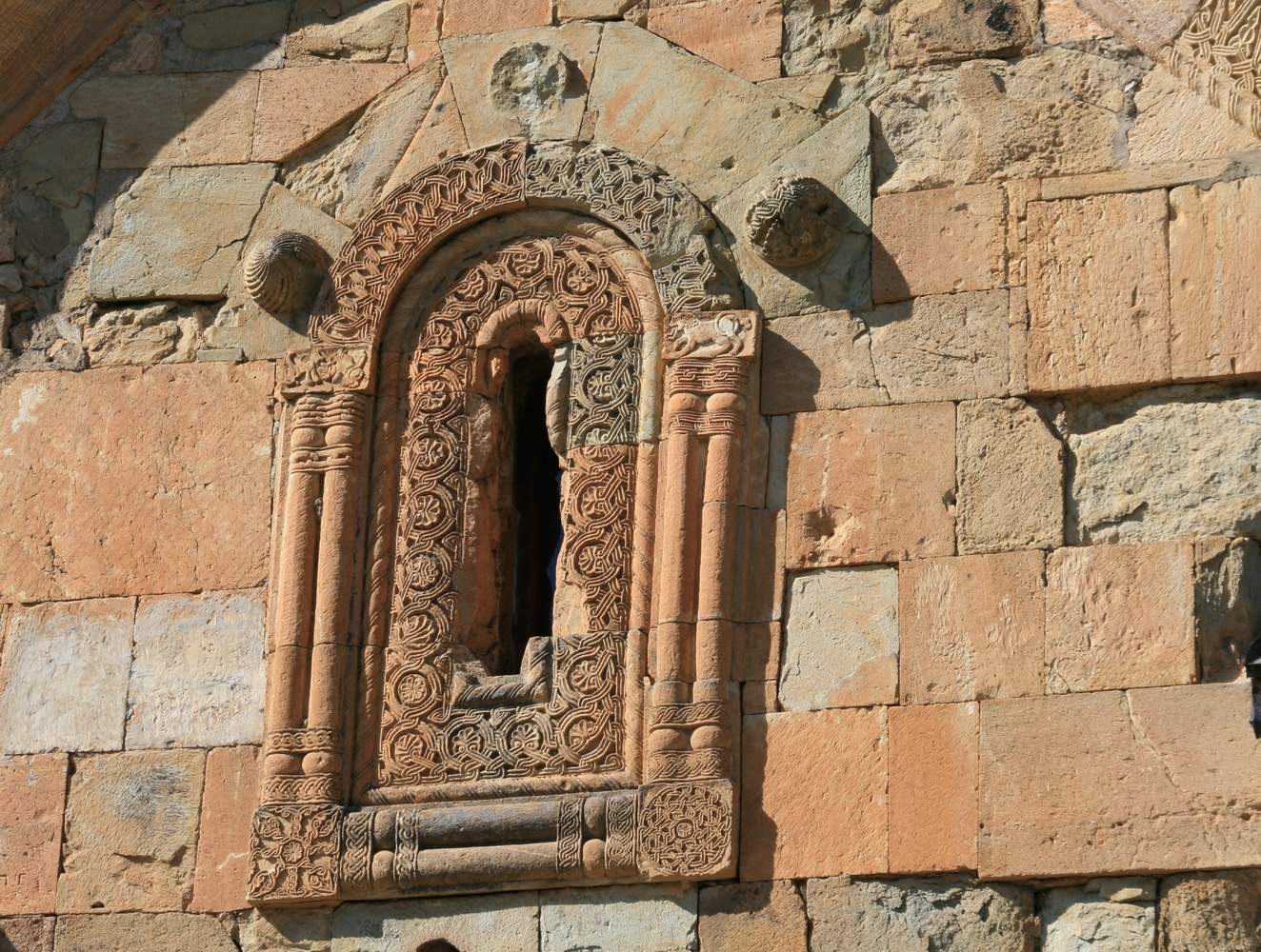
Window on the southern exterior facade.

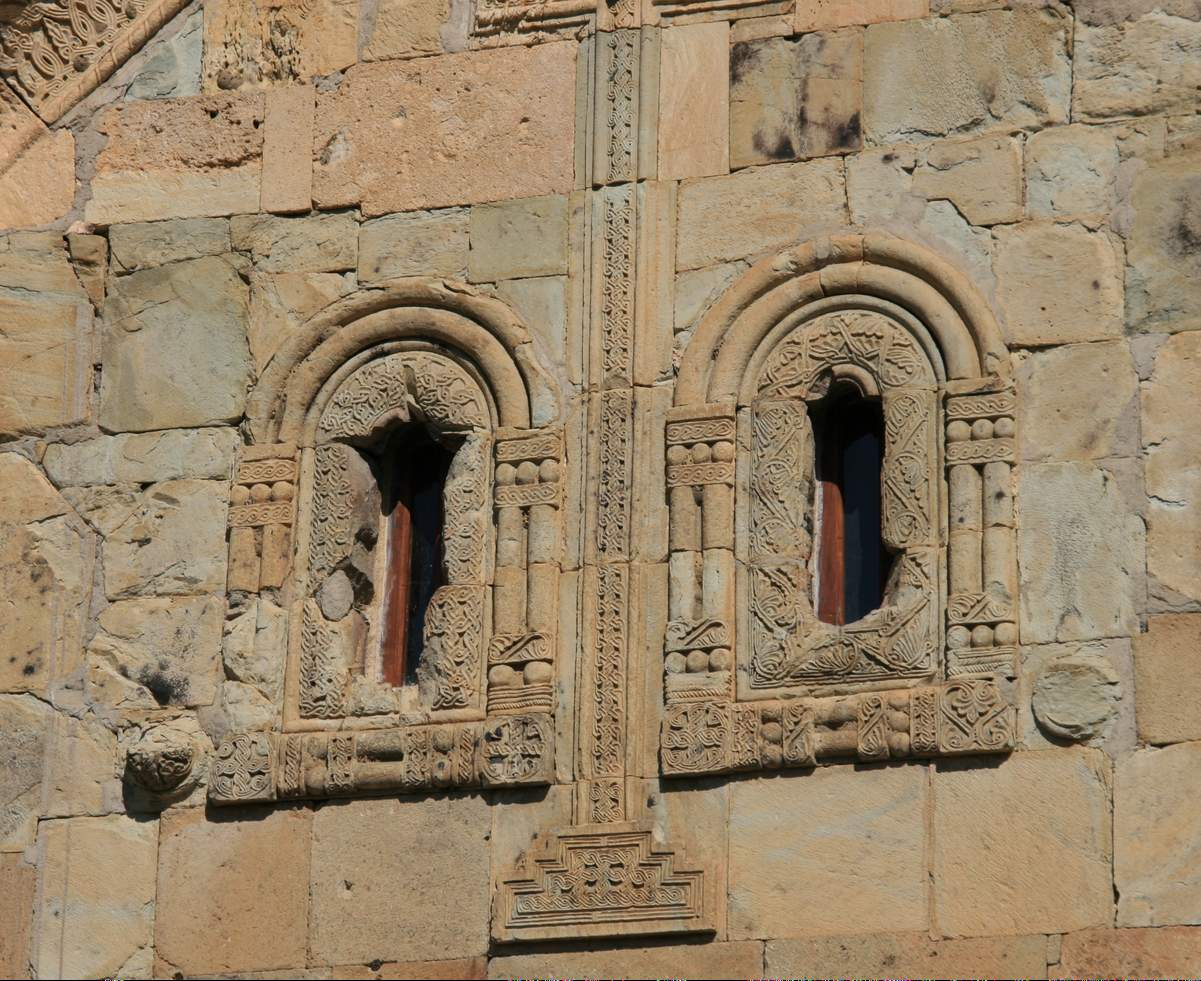
Windows on the western exterior facade.

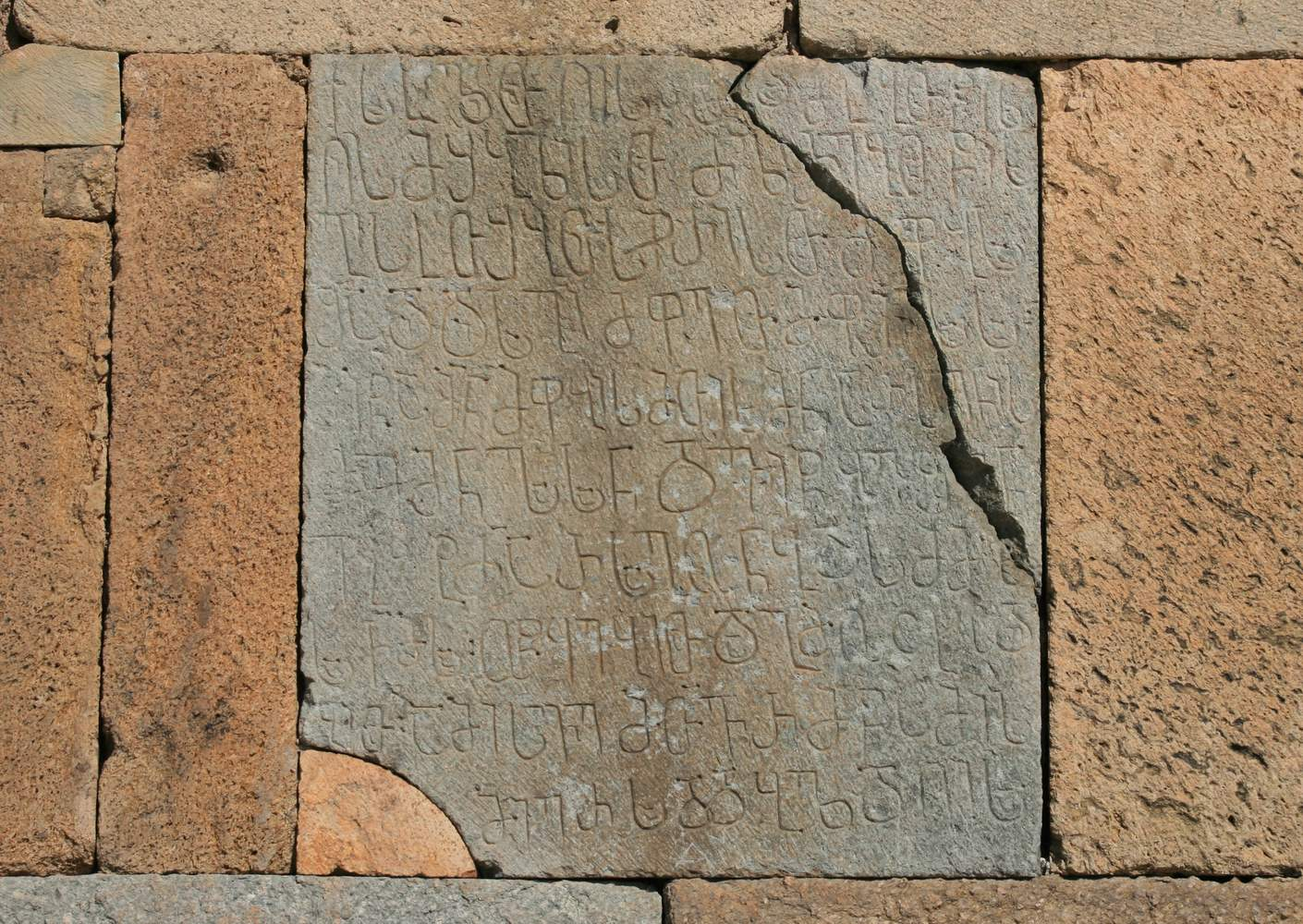
Inscription on the western exterior facade.

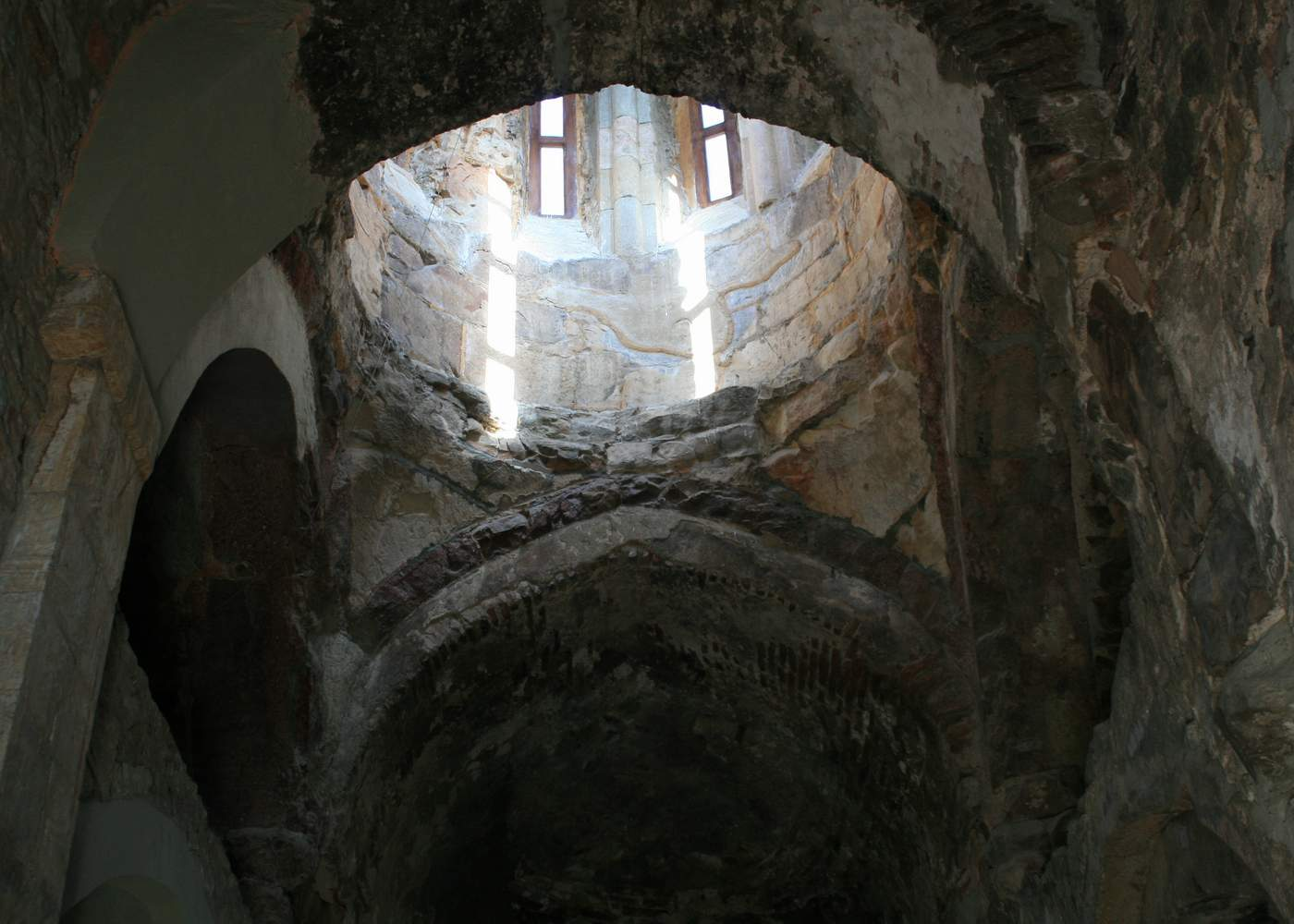
Interior of the drum.

== Bibliography ==
- Georgian Soviet Encyclopedia, P. Zakaraia, XI, p. 351, Tbilisi, 1987
