= Kvatakhevi =

Monastery in Georgia

Coordinates: 41°47′36″N 44°27′29″E

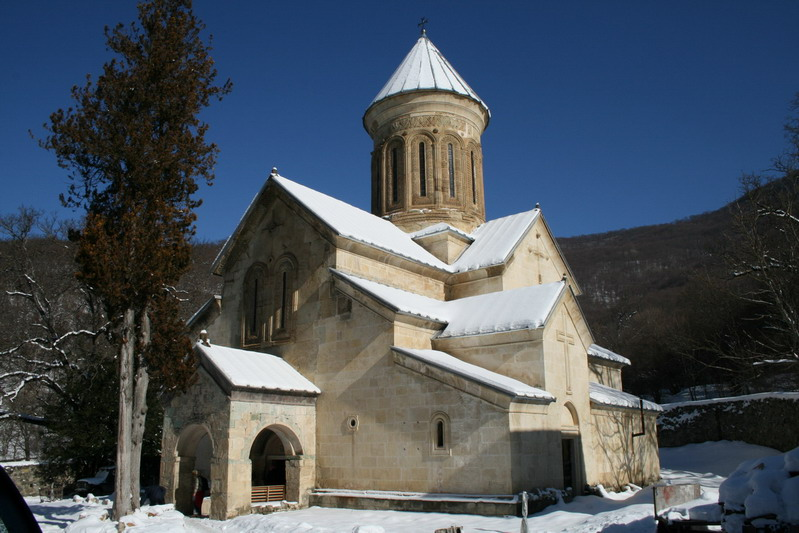
Kvatakhevi Church

Kvatakhevi (Georgian: ქვათახევი) is a medieval Georgian Orthodox monastery in Shida Kartli, Georgia, about 5 km south east of the village Tsinarekhi and 55 km (34 mi) west of the nation’s capital of Tbilisi.

The Kvatakhevi monastic complex is situated near the village Kavtiskhevi at the end of the gorge cut by a stream in the northern slopes of the Trialeti Range, protected on three sides by the steep mountain slopes. It dates to the 12th-13th century, and resembles the monasteries of Betania, Pitareti, and Timotesubani in its architectural form and decoration, reflecting a contemporary canon of a Georgian domed church architecture. The overall plan is nearly a square, with the dome resting upon 2 freely standing pillars and 2 pillars fused with the ledges of the altar. The internal space of the church is formed by the arms of the cross and the dome which surmounts the crossing point.

The building has two portals, one to the south and one to the west. The façades are covered with finely hewn white stone squares. The decoration abounds in fretwork, especially around the windows and the base of the dome; the eastern façade is adorned with a large ornate cross.

Historically, Kvatakhevi was also a literary center where several manuscripts were copied. It also possessed a treasure with many artifacts of medieval Georgian jewelry, a sizeable portion of which was later acquired by and are now on display at the Moscow State Historical Museum.

The monastery was significantly damaged during Timur's invasions of Georgia in the 14th century, but was subsequently repaired, more completely under the patronage of Prince Ivane Tarkhan-Mouravi in 1854. A belfry was added in 1872.
