= Pitareti Monastery =

Monastery in Tetritsqaro, Georgia

Pitareti Monastery ფიტარეთის მონასტერი
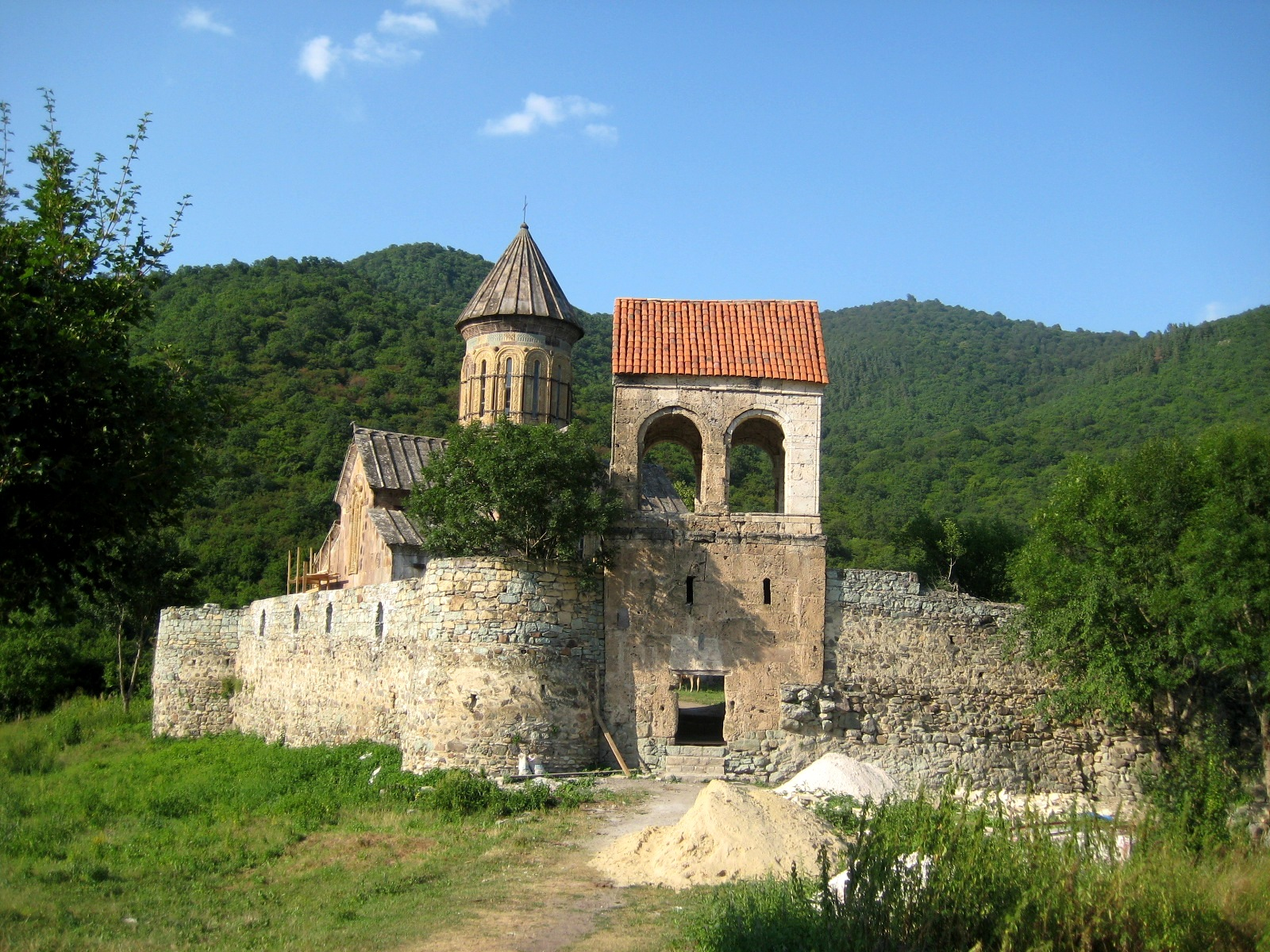
- The monastic complex of Pitareti.

- Location within Georgia

Religion
- Affiliation: Georgian Orthodox Church
- Region: Caucasus

Location
- Location: Located approximately 26 km southwest of Tetritsqaro, Kvemo Kartli Province (Mkhare), Georgia
- Coordinates: 41.4789°N 44.3197°E

Architecture
- Type: Georgian; Monastery
- Style: Monastic complex
- Funded by: Qaplan Orbelishvili - refurnished Pitareti, 1671
- Completed: Theotokos Church - Possibly 13th century

Pitareti Monastery (Georgian: ფიტარეთის მონასტერი) is a medieval Orthodox Christian monastery in Georgia, approximately 26 km southwest of the town of Tetritsqaro, Kvemo Kartli, southwest of the nation's capital Tbilisi.

The Pitareti monastery consists of the Theotokos church, a belfry, the ruined wall and several smaller accessory buildings. The main church appears to have been built in the reign of George IV early in the 13th century. Its design conforms to the contemporary canon of a Georgian domed church and shares a series of common features – such as a typical cross-in-square plan and a single lateral porch – with the monasteries of Betania, Kvatakhevi, and Timotesubani. The façades are decorated, accentuating the niches and dormers. The entire interior was once frescoed, but only significantly damaged fragments of those murals survive.

The monastery was a property and a burial ground of the noble family of Kachibadze-Baratashvili and, since 1536, of their offshoots – the princes Orbelishvili. A 14th-century inscription mentions a ctitor – the royal chamberlain Kavtar Kachibadze. Another inscription, from a grave stone, records the name of Qaplan Orbelishvili who refurnished the monastery in 1671. The monastery thrived at Pitareti until 1752 when it was forced to close due to a marauding attack from Dagestan.

== Gallery ==
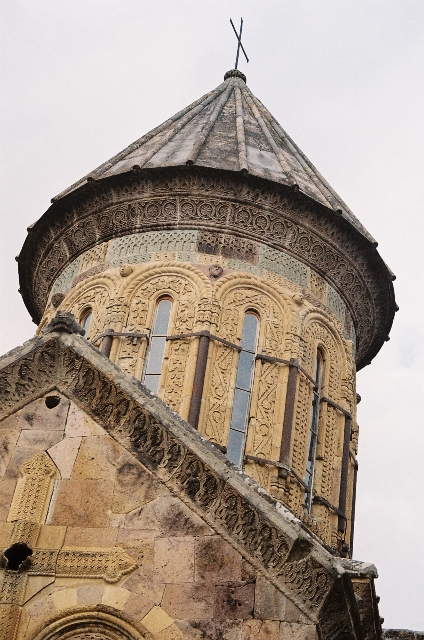
Drum and dome of the church.
