= Betania Monastery =

Georgian Orthodox monastery in Georgia

Coordinates: 41.69°N 44.6114°E

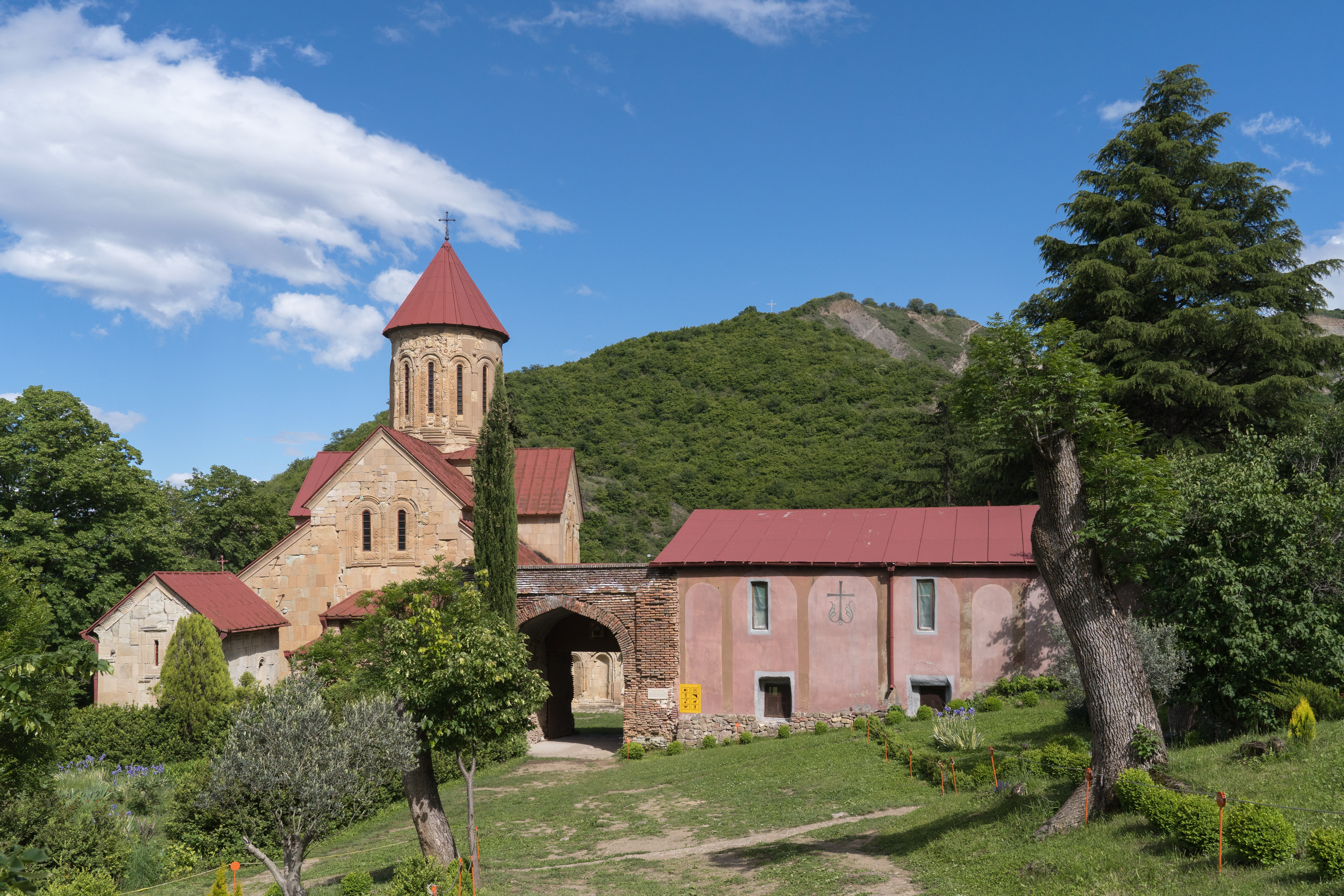
General view of Betania Monastery.

The Betania Monastery of the Nativity of the Mother of God (Georgian: ბეთანიის ყოვლადწმინდა ღვთისმშობლის შობის მონასტერი) commonly known as Betania or Bethania (ბეთანია [betʰania]) is a medieval Georgian Orthodox monastery in eastern Georgia, 16 km (9.9 mi) southwest of Tbilisi, the nation's capital. It is a remarkable piece of architecture of the Georgian Golden Age of the Kingdom of Georgia, at the turn of the 11th and 12th centuries, and is notable for its wall paintings which include a group portrait of the contemporary Georgian monarchs.

== History ==
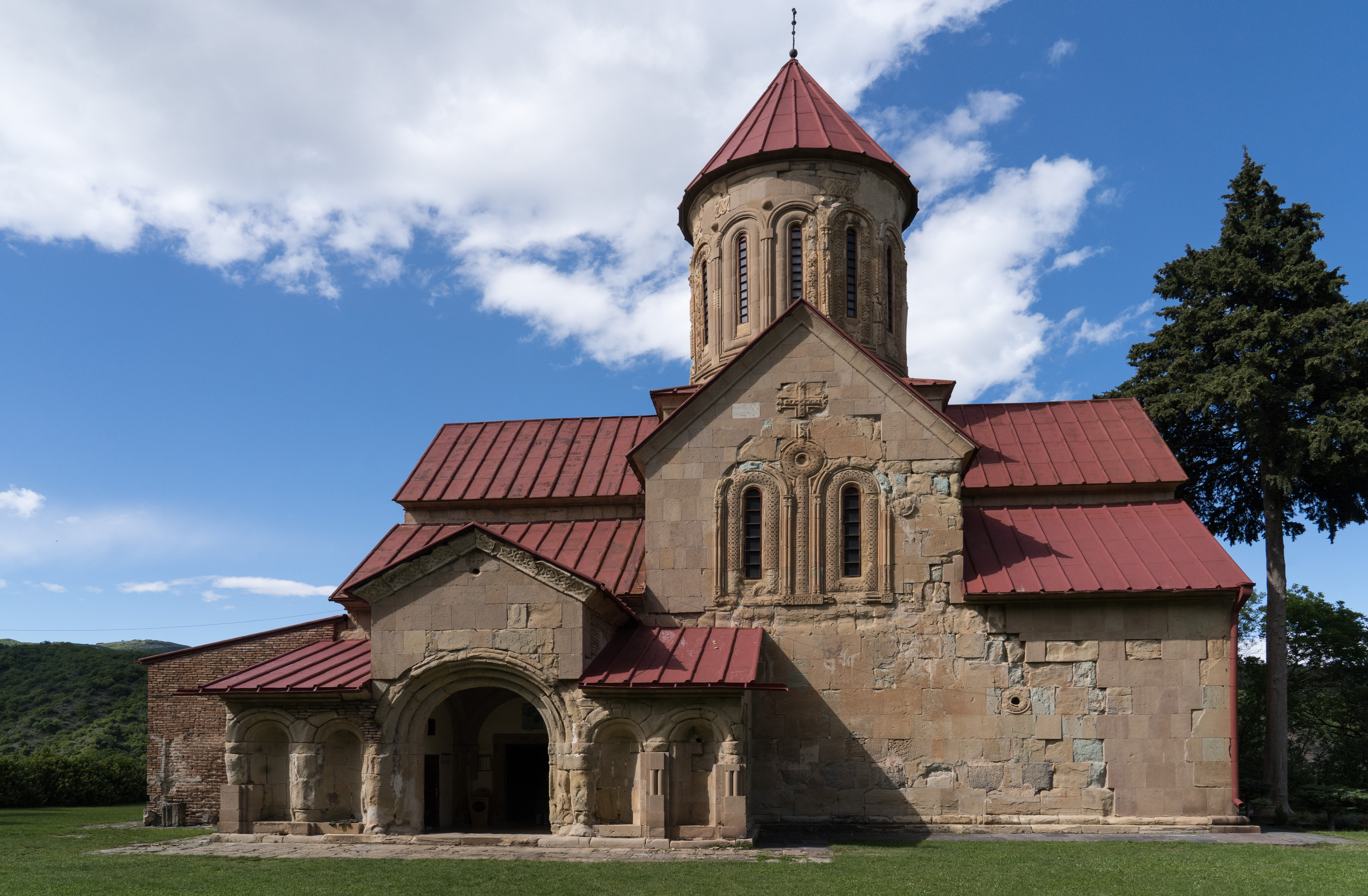
The principal church of the Betania Monastery complex.

Betania is located in the isolated wooded valley of the Vere River, 16 km (9.9 mi) southwest of Tbilisi. The name of the monastery is derived from that of the village Bethany in Palestine recorded in the New Testament as the home of Mary, Martha and Lazarus, as well as that of Simon the Leper.

The history of the monastery is poorly recorded in Georgian historical tradition. It was a familial abbey of the House of Orbeli. The donor image of Sumbat and Liparit Orbeli before the Mother of God appears on the south transept of the monastery. The Orbeli were temporarily dispossessed of their estates by the royal crown at the end of the 12th century, but their later offshoot, the Gostashabishvili family, appear to have been the monastery's owners in early modern Georgia.

A series of conflicts and foreign invasions that fill the history of Georgia left the monastery depopulated and half-ruined. It was restored, in the latter half of the 19th century, through the efforts of Hieromonk Spiridon Ketiladze who resigned as an abbot in 1922 and was succeeded by Hieromonk Ilia Pantsulaia. Both these monks were shot during the Soviet purges. Betania remained the only operating Georgian monastery, though unofficially, until 1963, when it also became defunct for the next 15 years. In 1978, the energetic Patriarch of Georgia Ilia II succeeded in obtaining permission from the Soviet authorities to reopen a monastery at Betania. In the 1990s, the cloister was refurnished and the local monastic community grew in size and influence.

== Architecture ==
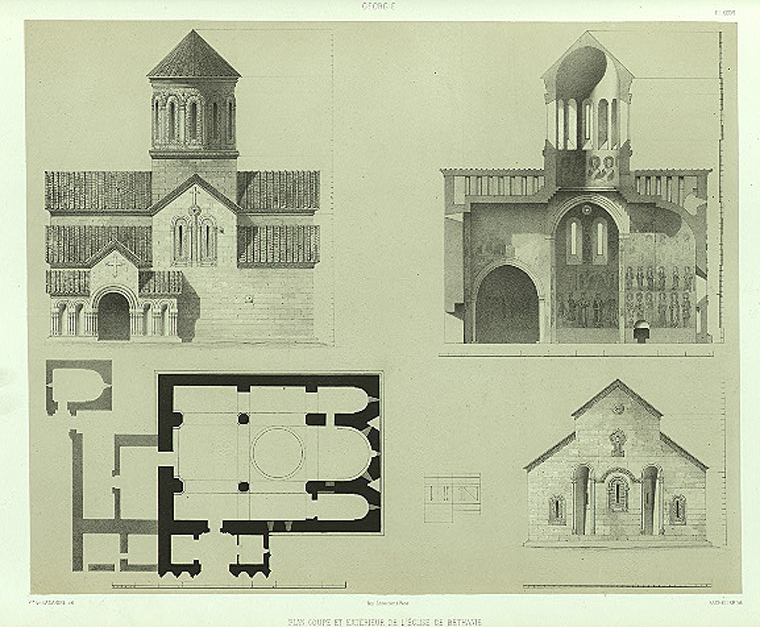
Plan of the Betania monastery per Prince Grigory Gagarin, 1847.

The monastery's territory seems to have been once surrounded by a massive wall, but only dismembered stones scattered in the adjacent forest have survived of it. The extant edifices are a principal domed church of the Nativity of the Mother of God (constructed at the turn of the 12th and 13th centuries), a smaller hall church of St. George (1196), and a ruined tower.

The church of the Nativity of the Mother of God is a cross-in-square design with a dome and built of stone, with some external carved decoration in the eastern façade where traditional niches have multifoil or scalloped tops connected to the frame of the middle window. Its high dome, slightly shifted to the east, rests upon the two westerly located freely standing pillars and ledges of the altar. The southern entrance portal is fronted by the gate roofed with a star-shaped vault. Modern scholars have surmised that the church is actually an expanded, domed and decorated version of an earlier basilica probably dating from the 10th century.

== Murals ==
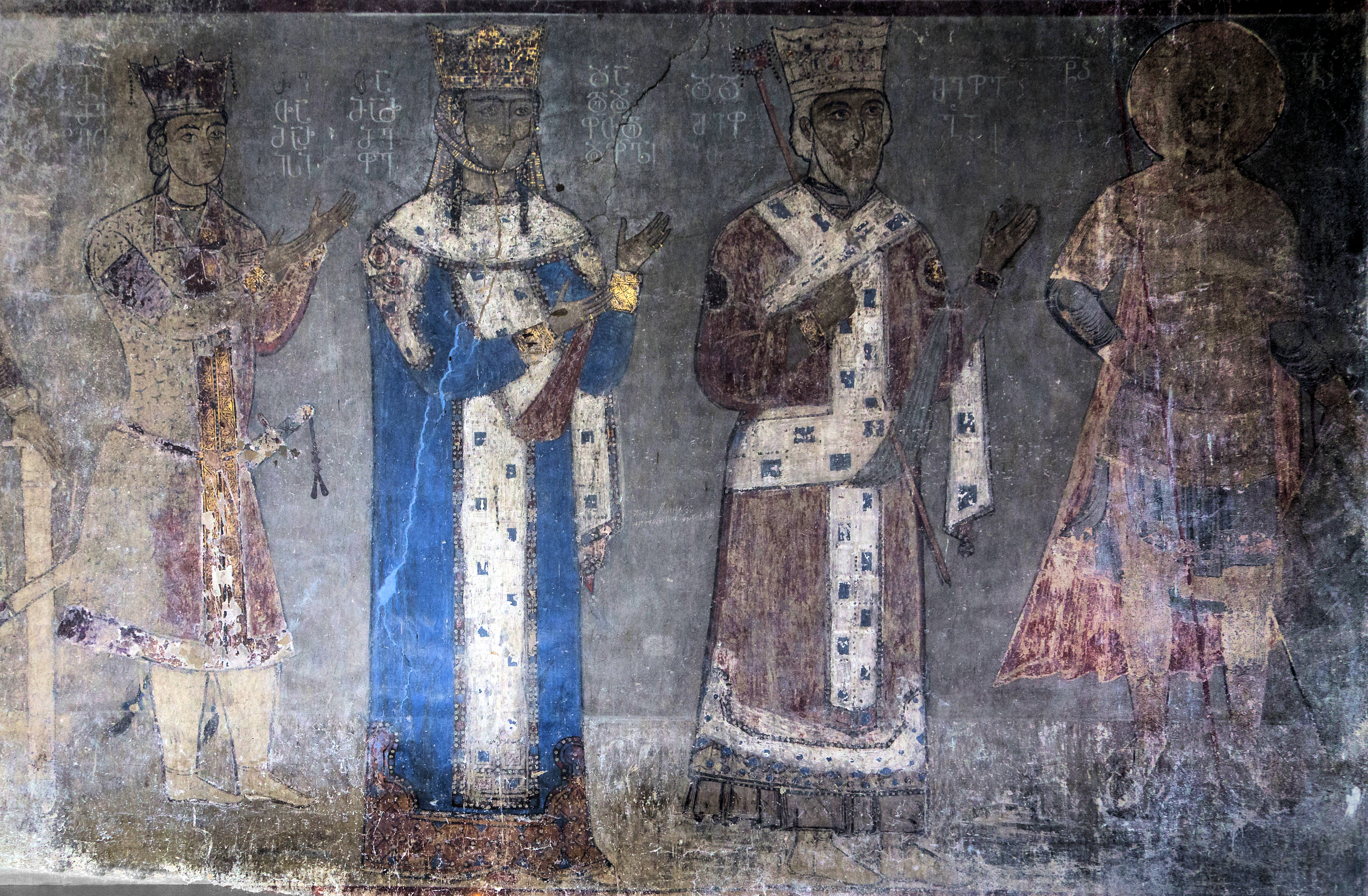
The royal panel at the Betania monastery: George IV Lasha, Tamar, and George III (from left to right)

The interior is adorned with significantly damaged murals which mark one of the high points of medieval Georgian wall painting. The conch of the altar contains a scene of Supplication of which only the fragments of the figure of an enthroned Christ have survived. The walls of the apses behind the altar are decorated with the frescos of Prophets holding scrolls with Georgian inscriptions. The northern wall is occupied by a cycle of the Passion of the Christ while the southern wall contains the scenes from the Old Testament and the western – those of the Last Judgment.

The north transept of the monastery is notable for the depiction of the Georgian monarchs dating from c. 1207. These are the portraits of George III (r. 1156–1184), his daughter Queen Tamar (r. 1184–1213), and the son of the latter George IV (r. 1213–1223). The Russian prince Grigory Gagarin discovered and cleaned the image of Tamar in 1851, and published his drawings and reports the same year. George IV is shown as a beardless young man in Georgian court robes, but he wears a crown and sword. These attributes suggest that George is depicted as a young king after his co-coronation with his mother, which took place after the death of his father, David Soslan, in 1207. The painting, therefore, helps to determine the approximate date of the Betania church. An important irregularity observed by modern scholars is that none of the secular figures at Betania has a halo, an attribute that was normally used in Georgian imagery to distinguish a royal person from the rest of society.

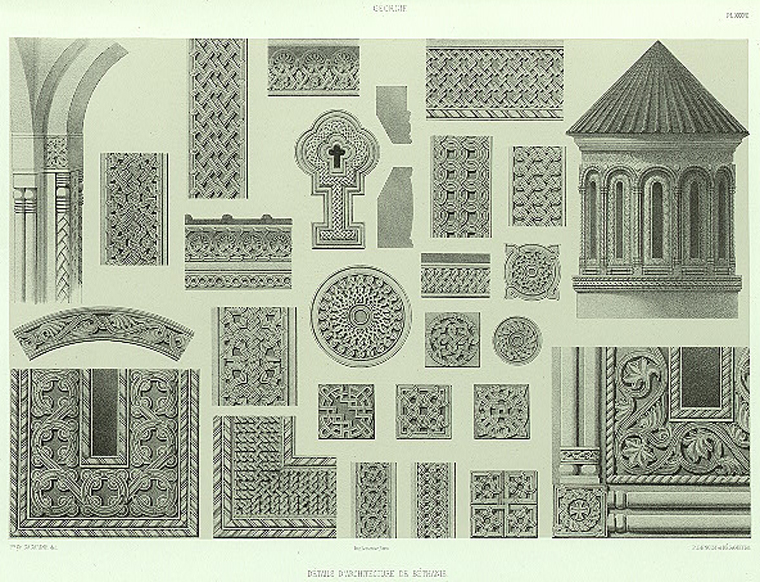
Betania architectural details, by Prince Gagarin, 1847

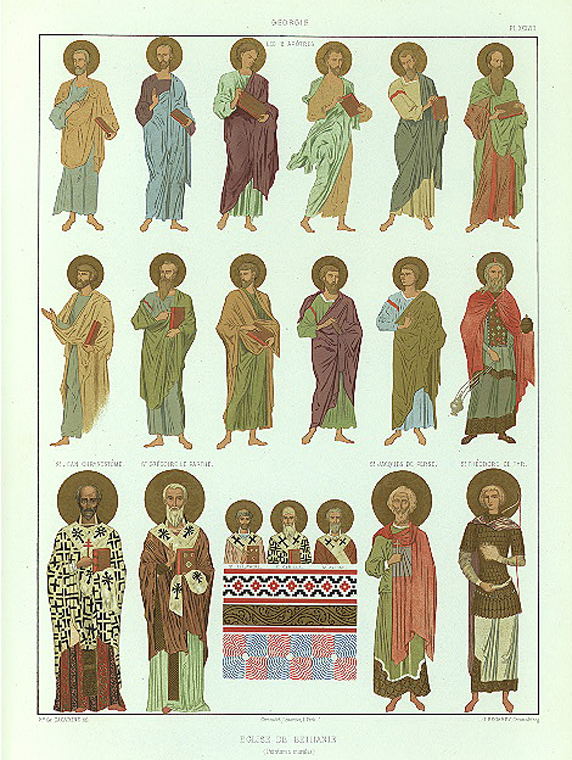
Murals from Betania, by Prince Gagarin, 1847

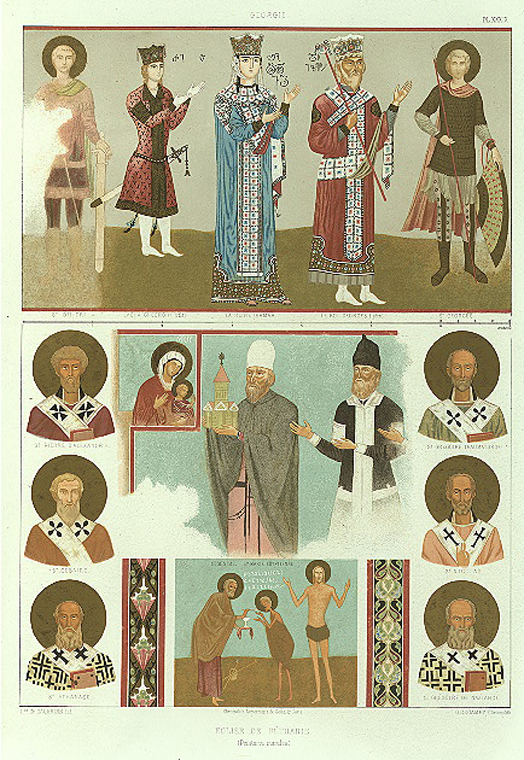
Murals from Betania, by Prince Gagarin, 1847
