= Omar Keshelashvili =

Georgian economist and scientist

Omar Keshelashvili Professor
- ომარ ქეშელაშვილი
- Born: July 9, 1940; Tbilisi, Georgian SSR
- Died: October 8, 2026 (aged 86)
- Other names: Omara Keshelashvili, Омар Кешелашвили
- Education: The Agricultural Institute of Georgia
- Occupations: Economist, professor, political scientist
- Years active: 1963–2026
- Employer: Georgia Business University
- Title: Professor of Economics
- Spouse: Marina Lezhava
- Children: 2
- Father: Grigol Keshelashvili
- Family: Keshelashvili
- Awards: 1999 - Order of Merit
- Website: http://www.nplg.gov.ge/bios/ka/00000516/

Omar Keshelashvili (Georgian: ომარ ქეშელაშვილი or ომარა ქეშელაშვილი, Russian: Омар Кешелашвили) was an economist, political scientist, agriculture scientist and professor. He also founded the Georgia Business University with his brother Nikoloz Keshelashvili. Omar graduated from The Agricultural Institute of Georgia in 1963, he became a senior scientist, sector manager and deputy director at the Scientific Research Institute of Agricultural Economy and Organization. Omar worked in the agriculture industry like his father, Grigol Keshelashvili.

In 1991 Omar and his brother Nikoloz Keshelashvili founded the Georgian Business University, Omar was the director of the Institute of Economics and Business LLC based in the university until his death in 2026.

== Life ==
=== Early life ===
Omar was born in the capital Tbilisi in the Georgian SSR of the Soviet Union. His parents were both scientists and professors, his father Grigol Keshelashvili was an agricultural scientist and professor of the field while his mother, Elisabed Mkheidze, was a professor of International politics and world affairs. Omar graduated from the Faculty of Economics and Organization of the Agricultural Institute of Georgia in 1963.

=== Institute of Agricultural Economy and Organization ===
Since 1966, he worked in the Scientific Research Institute of Agricultural Economy and Organization: as a senior scientist, sector manager, deputy director, director; In 1968, he defended the scientific degree of Candidate of Economic Sciences, and in 1978, Doctor of Economic Sciences; His doctoral dissertation was recognized as a new scientific direction in the field of economic evaluation of agricultural chemicalization, during which, as an innovative approach, the author used the possibilities of information technology. He has been awarded the scientific title of professor, he also wrote various books and investigations on economics and agricultural science.

=== Founding the Georgia Business University ===
1991–2011 For 20 years, Omar was the rector of the private higher education institution he founded - Georgia Business University. From 2011, he was the director of the Institute of Economics and Business LLC based on the base of this university; and from 2007 to 2011 as director of the newly established Institute of Agrarian Economics of the State Agricultural University, and then the Chairman of the Scientific Council. From 2008, he was the chairman and chief editor of the editorial-scientific board of the international, refereed, scientific-methodological and practical journal "Agrarian-Economic Science and Technology," founded by him. With his research, he created new directions in Georgian agrarian-economic science. He was the first to develop a very specific methodology, with a computer program, and based on it, he gave an economic assessment of the use of chemical means in Georgian agriculture and its scientific foundations, taking into account zonal features, laying the foundation for research on the problems of agricultural risk management in farms and was the first (2008–2009) to determine the economic shifts in the appropriateness of risk and the optimal levels of return, taking into account the zonal characteristics of farms. In 2009, the territory of Georgia was divided into 13 zones and 8 sub-zones in terms of agricultural production specialization. In 2019, following the development of the integration of production processes, which led to the functional convergence and connection of agriculture and the food industry, made some changes to this scheme, and it adapted to the development of the food industry for the first time in a period of almost 70 years since 1950. From 1980, he began giving lectures at Tbilisi State University and Agricultural University of Georgia. He taught 31 postgraduate and doctoral students, took part in 5 world congresses, published 1050 scientific works, including 230 books, of which 53 monographs, 9 textbooks, 136 brochures, 275 newspaper scientific - publication works, with a total number of scientific and scientific publication works coming to 1,325. In 2013, he was awarded the "Best Scientist of the Year" honour in the agricultural field rank in the field of economy. In 2018 he was given an honorary award of the Ministry of Education, Science, Culture and Sports of Georgia for long lasting and successful scientific and educational activities in the field of higher education and science, with the title of "Doctor of Economic Sciences, Professor."

Omar developed serious complications with Parkinson's disease. He passed away in October, 2026, in Tbilisi, Georgia.

== Notable works ==
Below is a list of books and parts of books which were fully or partially written by Omar Keshelashvili.

- ეკონომიკური გააზრებები : ახლებური მიდგომები და განმარტებები (ავტორი). - თბილისი, 2021
- სოფლის მეურნეობისწ ეკონომიკურ-სტატისტუკური შეფასება (ავტორი). - თბილისი, 2020
- სოფლის მეურნეობის სპეციალიზაცია, ეკონომიკური ზრდის პირობები და განვითარების პროგნოზი : სამეცნიერო-საგანმანათლებლო და გამოყენებითი ხასიათის მონოგრაფია) : კვლევის უნარ-ჩვევებისა და განზოგადების მასტერ-კლასი მაგისტრანტების, დოქტორანტებისა და მეცნიერ-თანამშრომლებისათვის (ავტორი). - თბილისი, აგრო, 2019. - 138გვ.. - ISBN 9789941045325
- ეკონომიკის გენეზისი (ავტორი). - თბილისი, აგრო, 2019. - 85გვ.. - ISBN 9789941809910
- სოფლის მეურნეობის მეცნიერების განვითარების პროგნოზი (თანაავტორი). - თბილისი, საქ. სოფლის მეურნეობის მეცნ. აკადემია, 2015. - 67გვ.. - ISBN 9789941081354
- ეს, ყველამ უნდა იცოდეს (ავტორი). - თბილისი, არეალი, 2015. - 256გვ.
- ეკონომისტისა და ბიზნესმენის ცნობარი : მონოგრაფია (ავტორი). - თბილისი, 2014. - 335გვ.. - ISBN 978-9941-0-6293-3
- ეკონომიკური ცოდნის მცირე საგანძური (ავტორი). - თბილისი, არეალი, 2014. - 162გვ.. - ISBN 978-9941-0-6531-6
- ბიზნესური ეკონომიკა : სახელმძღვ. (ავტორი). - თბილისი, არეალი, 2010. - 440გვ.. - ISBN 978-9941-0-2383-5
- საქართველოს აგრარული სექტორის ეკონომიკური ზრდის სტრატეგიული სისტემა : მონოგრაფია (ავტორი). - თბილისი, არეალი, 2010. - 107გვ.. - ISBN 978-9941-0-0900-6
- რისკის მართვა ფერმერულ მეურნეობებში : მონოგრაფია (ავტორი). - თბილისი, არეალი, 2009. - 206გვ.. - ISBN 978-9941-0-1892-3
- ინტელექტუალური საუბრები : დამხმარე სახელმძღვანელო (ავტორი). - თბილისი, არეალი, 2005. - 283გვ.
- ფერმერული მეურნეობის მენეჯმენტი : პრაქტ. სახელმძღვ. (ავტორი). - თბილისი, არეალი, 2005. - 137გვ.
- ვინ იცის ეკონომიკა? : 2 წიგნად : დამხმ. სახელმძღვ. (ავტორი). - თბილისი, არეალი, 2004
- საქართველო მსოფლიო გლობალიზაციის წრედში (ავტორი). - თბილისი, არეალი, 2004. - 30გვ.
- საბაზრო ეკონომიკა და სამეურნეო რისკი (ავტორი). - თბილისი, არეალი, 2004. - 27გვ.
- სამართალმცოდნეობა ყველასათვის (ავტორი). - თბილისი, პეგასი, 2001. - 342გვ.
- ბიზნესი ყველასათვის : საუბრები ბიზნესზე (ავტორი). - თბილისი, მნათე, 1996. - 68გვ.
- ბიზნესის ორგანიზაცია : სახელმძღვ. (ავტორი). - თბილისი, მნათე, 1995. - 196გვ.
- სოფლის მეურნეობა აგროსამრეწველო კომპლექსის სისტემაში (ავტორი). - თბილისი, საქართველო, 1991. - 151გვ.
- საქართველოს სსრ აგროსამრეწველო კომპლექსის ეკონომიკური პოტენციალი (ავტორი). - თბილისი, საქ. სსრ საზ-ბა "ცოდნა", 1989. - 32გვ.
- სამთო სოფლის მეურნეობის განვითარების ეკონომიკური პრობლემები = Экономические проблемы развития горного сельского хозяйства = Economic problems of development of mountain agriculture (ავტორი). - თბილისი, არეალი. - 33გვ.. - ISBN 978-9941-0-2062-9

== See also ==
- Keshelashvili
- Tsinarekhi
