= Pavnisi church =

Monument in Shida Kartli, Georgia

Pavnisi church of Saint George
- ფავნისის წმინდა გიორგის ეკლესია
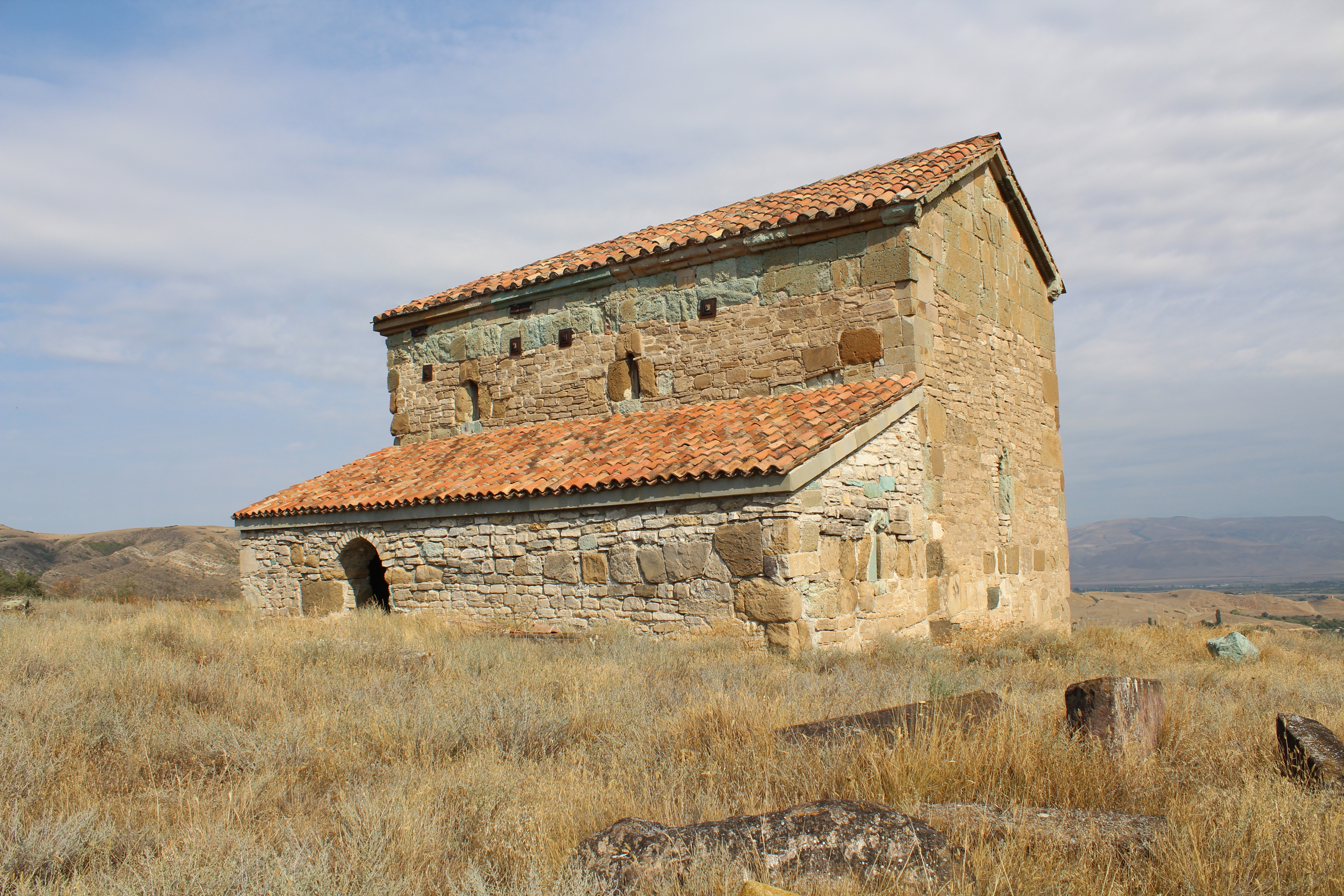
- Pavnisi church of Saint George.
- Interactive map of Pavnisi church of Saint George
- Location: Gariqula, Kaspi Municipality; Shida Kartli, Georgia
- Coordinates: 41.874282°N 44.334672°E
- Type: Hall church

The Pavnisi church of Saint George (Georgian: ფავნისის წმინდა გიორგის ეკლესია, romanized: pavnisis ts'minda giorgis ek'lesia) is a Georgian Orthodox church in the Kaspi Municipality in Georgia's east-central region of Shida Kartli. It is a hall church dated to the 9th–10th-century. The church is known for its frescoes dated to the latter half of the 12th century. The church is inscribed on the list of Georgia's Immovable Cultural Monuments of National Significance.

== Layout ==
The Pavnisi church is located at an old cemetery south of the modern village of Gariqula, in the territory that had historically been known as Pavnisi. Built of sandstone and tuff and measuring 12.4 × 10.8 m, it is a simple hall church with a semicircular apse on the east. The church is covered by a semi-cylindrical vault which is supported by arches on pilasters. The building can be accessed through a doorway in the south wall. A low chapel, an eukterion—now half-ruined—is annexed to the south façade of the church. The interior is frescoed. On the eastern façade, there are the sculpted ornamental crosses on either side of the window and a depiction of a serpent swallowing the sun on a large sandstone slab placed above the window.

== Frescoes ==
The plastered walls of the interior bear frescoes of high artistic value, executed between around 1170 and 1180 and painted over an earlier layer of the murals which can be traced on the northern and southern walls. The style of the paintings demonstrate that the painter was well-acquainted with Byzantine models. The frescoes—noted for the color harmony and the purity of line—have largely faded away or have been peeled off, but are in a relatively better state of preservation in the apse.

The conch of the sanctuary is adorned with the Deesis. In the middle register are bust figures of the twelve Apostles and the lower register depicts ten Church Fathers and two deacons in two rows which converge on the Holy Cross enclosed in a medallion and the image of the Mandylion just below it. The west wall is taken up with a Christological cycle, containing the Transfiguration, and below, Pentecost and Entry into Jerusalem.

There is also an extensive cycle of the life and martyrdom of Saint George, consisting of five scenes, including the one depicting George rescuing a youth from captivity, one of the oldest representations of the legend in Christian art. That the veneration of St. George was especially great in medieval Georgia is illustrated by a donor portrait in the north wall, where two imposing figures of noble laymen and a child between them are shown as praying, with George as the intercessory saint. Flanking the scene, the images of swords and shields are displayed. The donors are probably members of the Pavneli noble family, known from medieval records.
