= Grigol Keshelashvili =

Georgian Agronomist

Grigol Keshelashvili Professor
- გრიგოლ ქეშელაშვილი
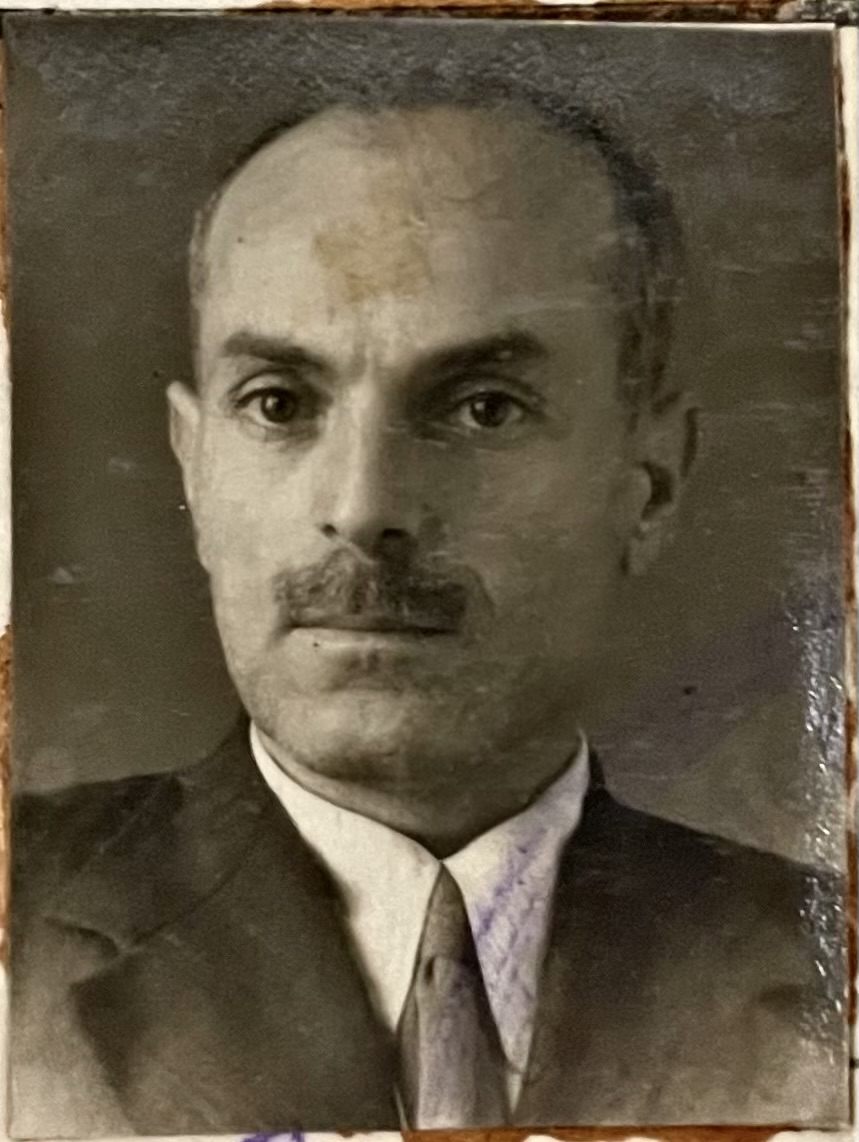
- Born: August 31, 1906; Tiflis Governorate, Russian Empire
- Died: 1994; Tbilisi, Georgia (country)
- Other name: Григол Николаевич Кешелашвили
- Education: Agricultural Institute of Georgia
- Occupations: Professor, agronomist, agricultural scientist, writer
- Years active: 1931–1994
- Spouse: Elizabed Mkheidze
- Children: Omar Keshelashvili, Nikoloz Keshelashvili
- Family: Keshelashvili
- Awards: Order of the Red Banner of Labour

Grigol Nikolaevich Keshelashvili (Georgian: გრიგოლ ნიკოლოზის ძე ქეშელაშვილი, Russian: Григол Николаевич Кешелашвили) was a Georgian agronomist, agricultural scientist, professor and an Honored Worker of Sciences of the Georgian SSR.

== Biography ==
Grigol Keshelashvili was born in the village of Tsinarekhi in 1906, he was sent to Tbilisi by his parents to attend school for better a quality education since his hometown didn't have any schools, he lived with a close family friend during school semesters and visited his family during summers by train. On one occasion, during World War I, train transportation was halted for civilians due to the Imperial Russian Army ordering for it to be used for the transportation of soldiers and weapons, Keshelashvili had to walk 43 kilometres to Kaspi to visit his family. In 1931, he graduated from the Agricultural Institute of Georgia. In 1938–1981, he was the head of the General Agriculture Department of the same institute. He studied the main issues of soil cultivation for field crops in Georgia, as well as weeds and means of fighting them. Author of textbooks: "Farming and Planting" (1964); "General Farming" (co-author, 1975); "Fundamentals of Agriculture" (co-author, 1972); "Georgian weed vegetation and means of combating it" (1966) and others. He was awarded the Order of the Red Banner of Labor and medals.

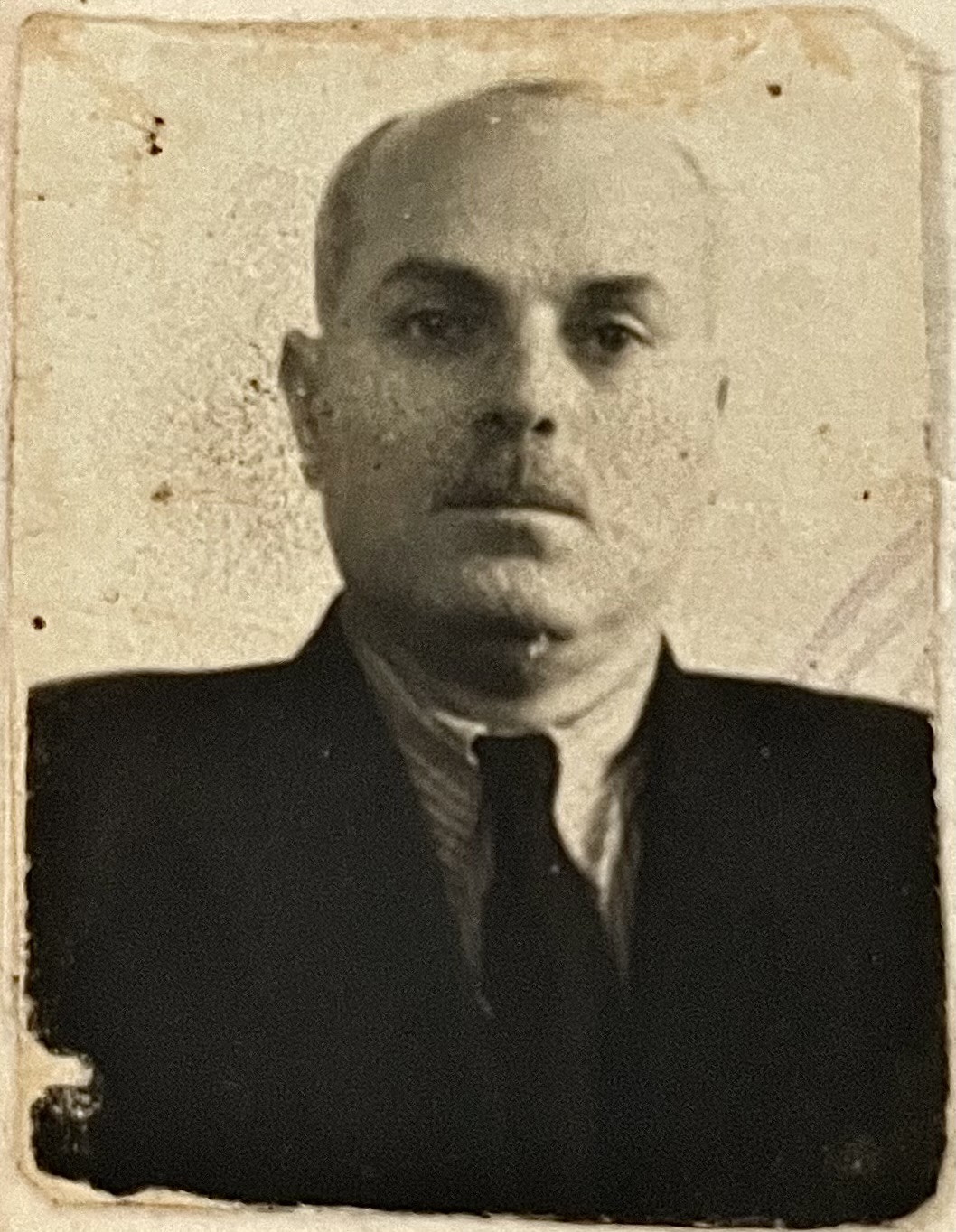

== Notable works ==
- სარეველა მცენარეები, მათთან ბრძოლის საშუალებანი და ეკონომიკური შეფასება. (Author). – Tbilisi, Georgian SSR, 1987. – 89გვ.
- საქართველოს სარეველა მცენარეულობა და მასთან ბრძოლის საშუალებები : დამხმ. სახელმძღვ. სას.-სამ. ინ-ტის სტუდენტებისათვის (Author). – Tbilisi, Georgian SSR, განათლება, 1966. – 201გვ.
- მიწათმოქმედება და მემცენარეობა : სახელმძღვ. სას.-სამ. ინ-ტების მექანიზაციის ფაკ-ტის სტუდენტებისათვის (Author). – Tbilisi, Georgian SSR, ცოდნა, 1964. – 326გვ.

== See also ==
- Keshelashvili
- Omar Keshelashvili
