= Keshelashvili =

Keshelashvili, Qeshelashvili ქეშელაშვილი Кешелашвили
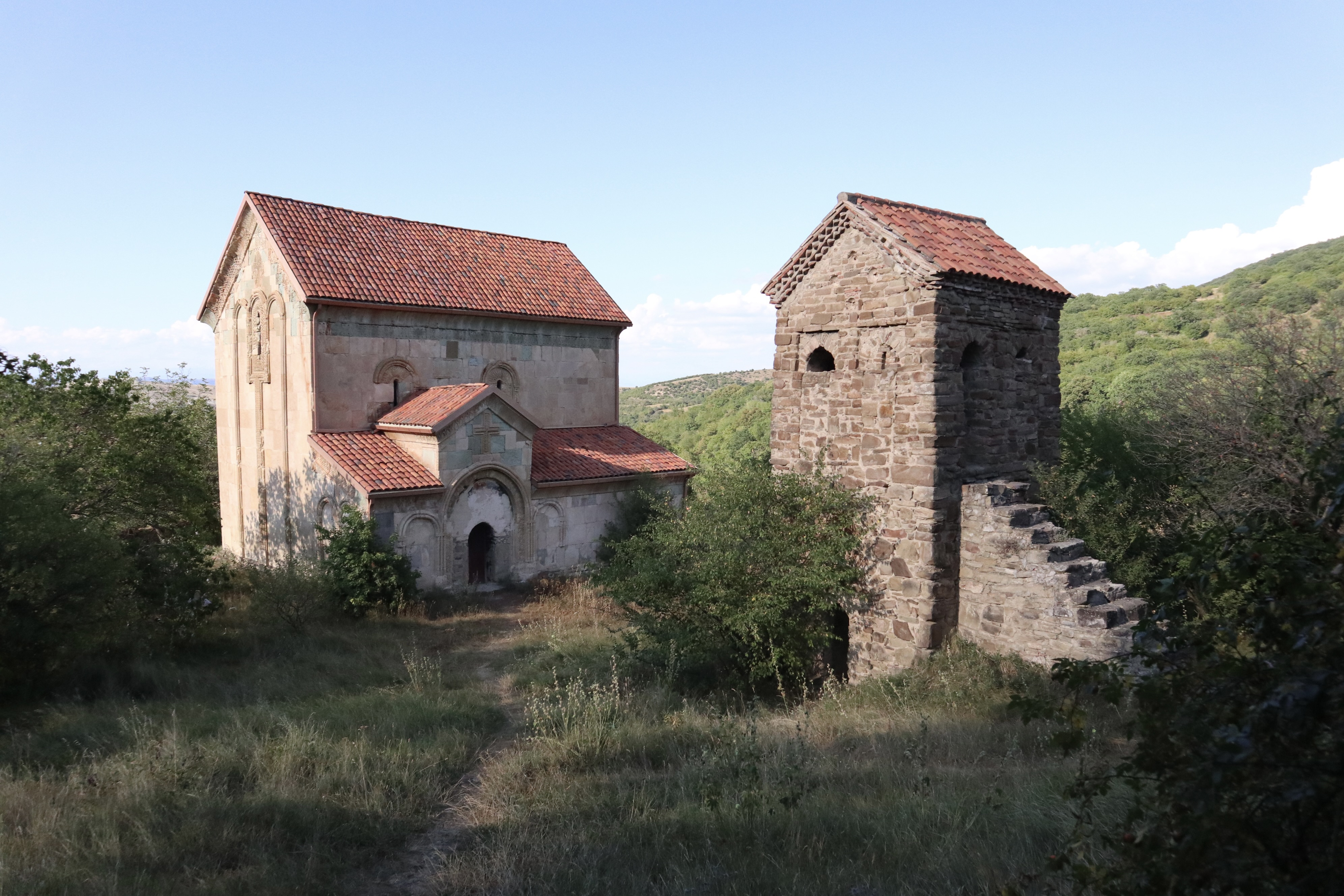
- The Maghalashvili monastery near the village of Tsinarekhi.
- Parent family: Lomisashvili
- Country: Georgia
- Current region: Central and Southern Georgia
- Origin: Shida Kartli, Kvemo Kartli
- Founded: 1606–1615
- Founder: Mamuka Keshelashvili, Luarsab II of Kartli
- Properties: Tsinarekhi, Maghalashvili castle complex, Kvatakhevi monastery

Keshelashvili or Qeshelashvili (Georgian: ქეშელაშვილი, Russian: Кешелашвили) is a Georgian surname that is from the Shida Kartli and Kvemo Kartli regions of Georgia, it is most common in the village of Tsinarekhi, Gori, Thezi, Kavthiskhevi, Kaspi and in the capital city of Tbilisi. It is mostly occurrent in Georgia, Russia and Turkey. The surname originated from the Kingdom of Kartli during the reign of Luarsab II between the years 1606 and 1615.

== Origins ==
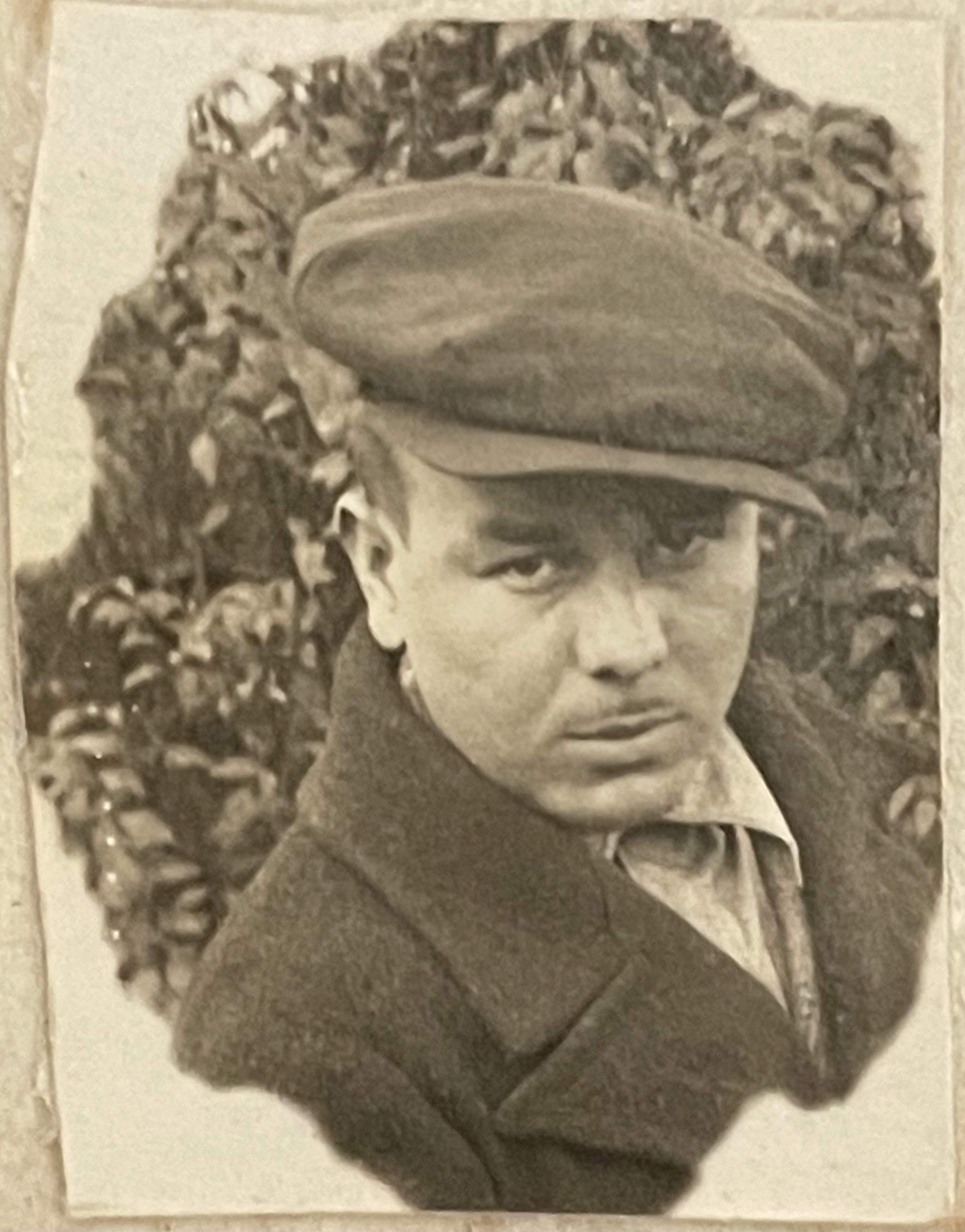
Teimuraz Nikolaevich Keshelashvili.

The origins of Keshelashvili are debated but it is known from a medieval Georgian legend that the surname came from a very old surname known as "Lomisashvili" (alternate spelling: "Lomasashvili"), the history of Keshelashvili goes back to the 17th century, a man named "Mamuka Lomisashvili" was given an honorary title of the founder of a new surname and he became "Mamuka Keshelashvili". It is believed that he was the first person to bear the surname, it was given to him by the king Luarsab II between 1606 and 1615 during a royal ceremony.

== Notable people ==
- Grigol Keshelashvili, professor and scientist of agriculture in the Soviet Union.
- Omar Keshelashvili (born 1941), professor of economics and agriculture, founder of the Georgian Business University.
- Irakli Nikolaevich Keshelashvili (1913–unknown), professional oboe player and junior lieutenant from the Red Army in WWII.
- Teimuraz Nikolaevich Keshelashvili (1917–unknown), chemist and lieutenant in the Red Army in WWII.

== See also ==
- Tsinarekhi
- Maghalashvili
- Kaspi
