= Maghalashvili =

Maghalashvili მაღალაშვილი Maghaladze, მაღალაძე

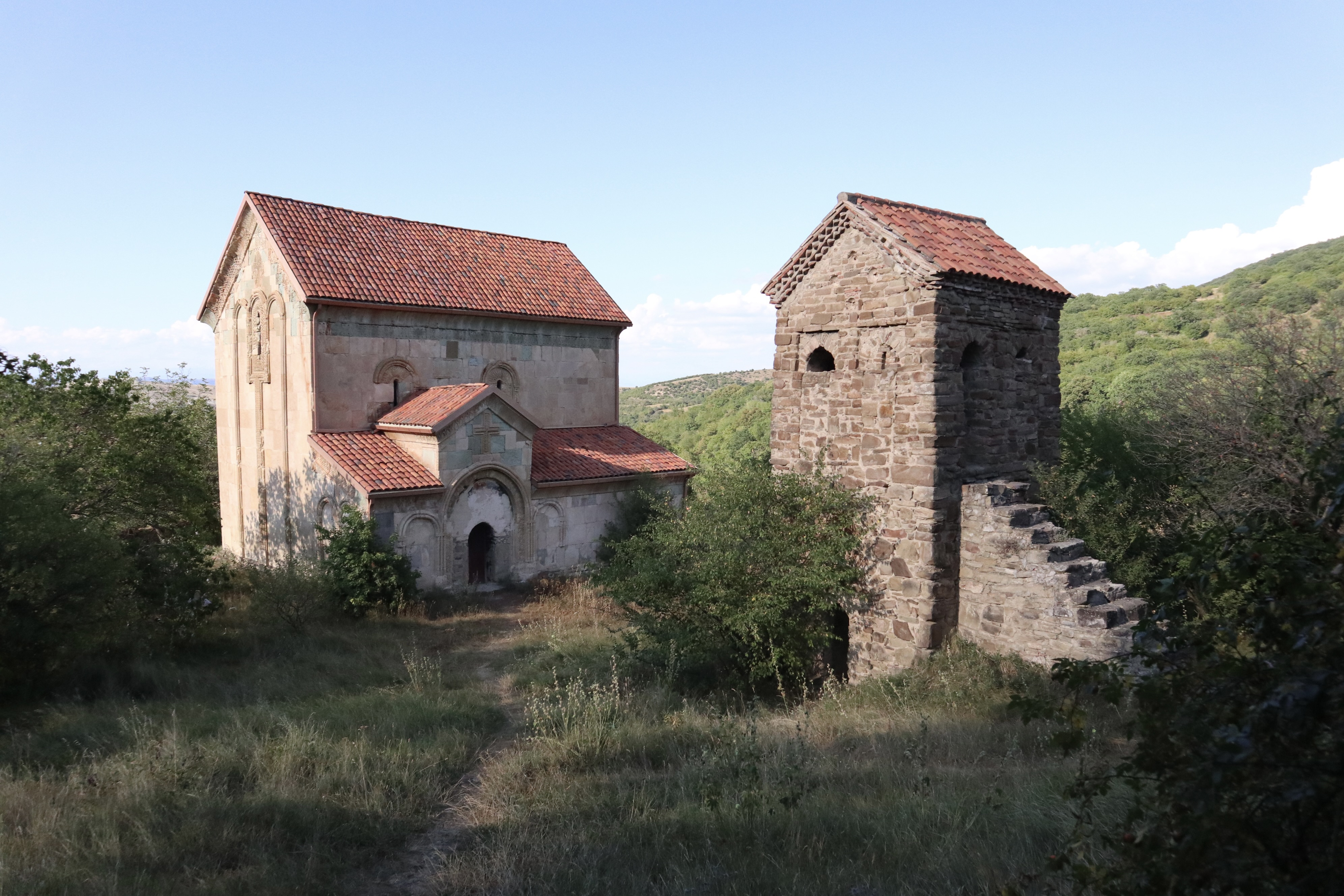
- Maghalashvili monastery located 2.1 Kilometres south of Tsinarekhi.
- Parent family: Mkhargrdzeli
- Country: Georgia
- Current region: Shida Kartli, Imereti, Kvemo Kartli
- Etymology: Maghala (Georgian: Tall, Greek: Great) Shvili (Georgian: Son)
- Founded: AD 1415

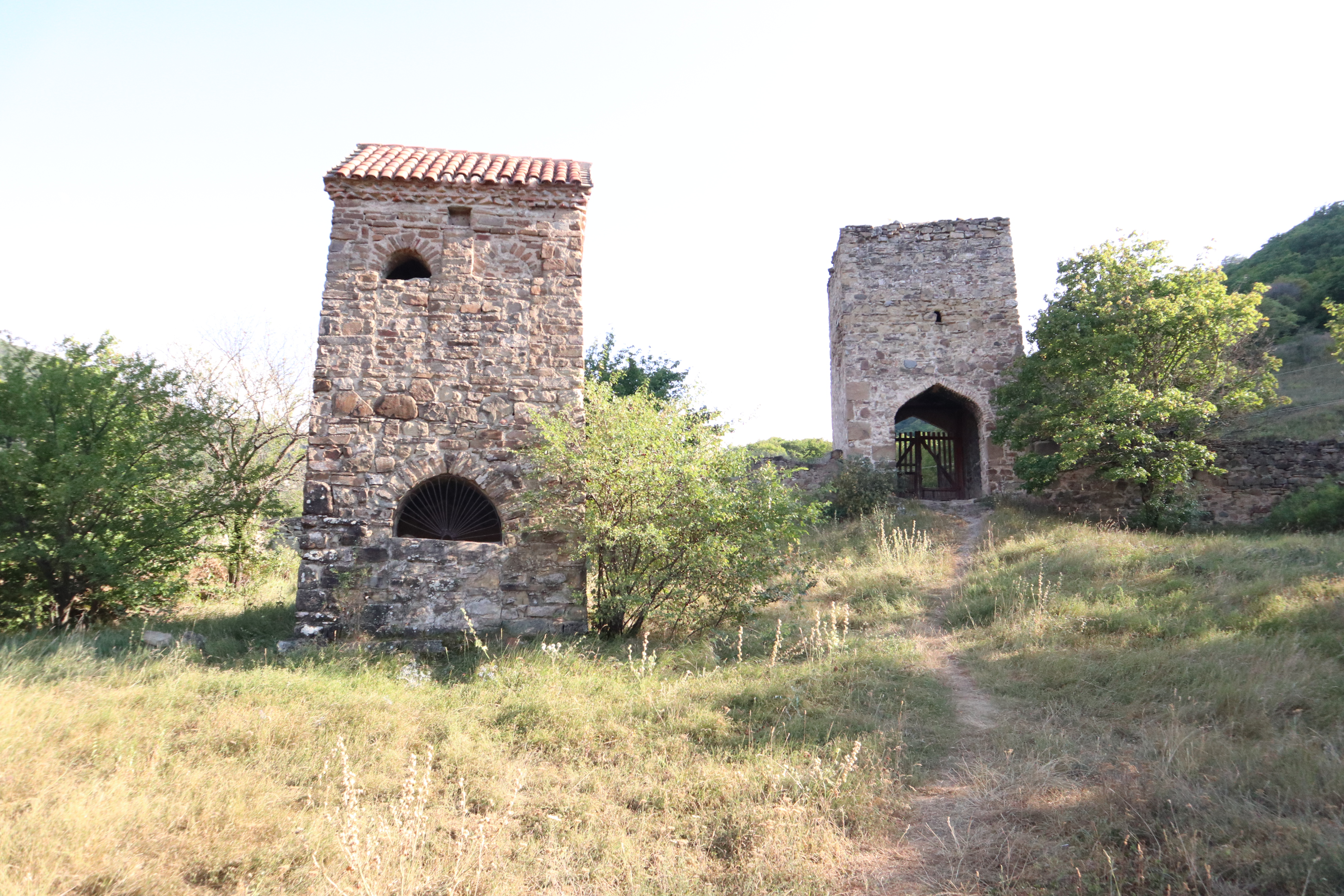
Photo of Maghalashvili monastery

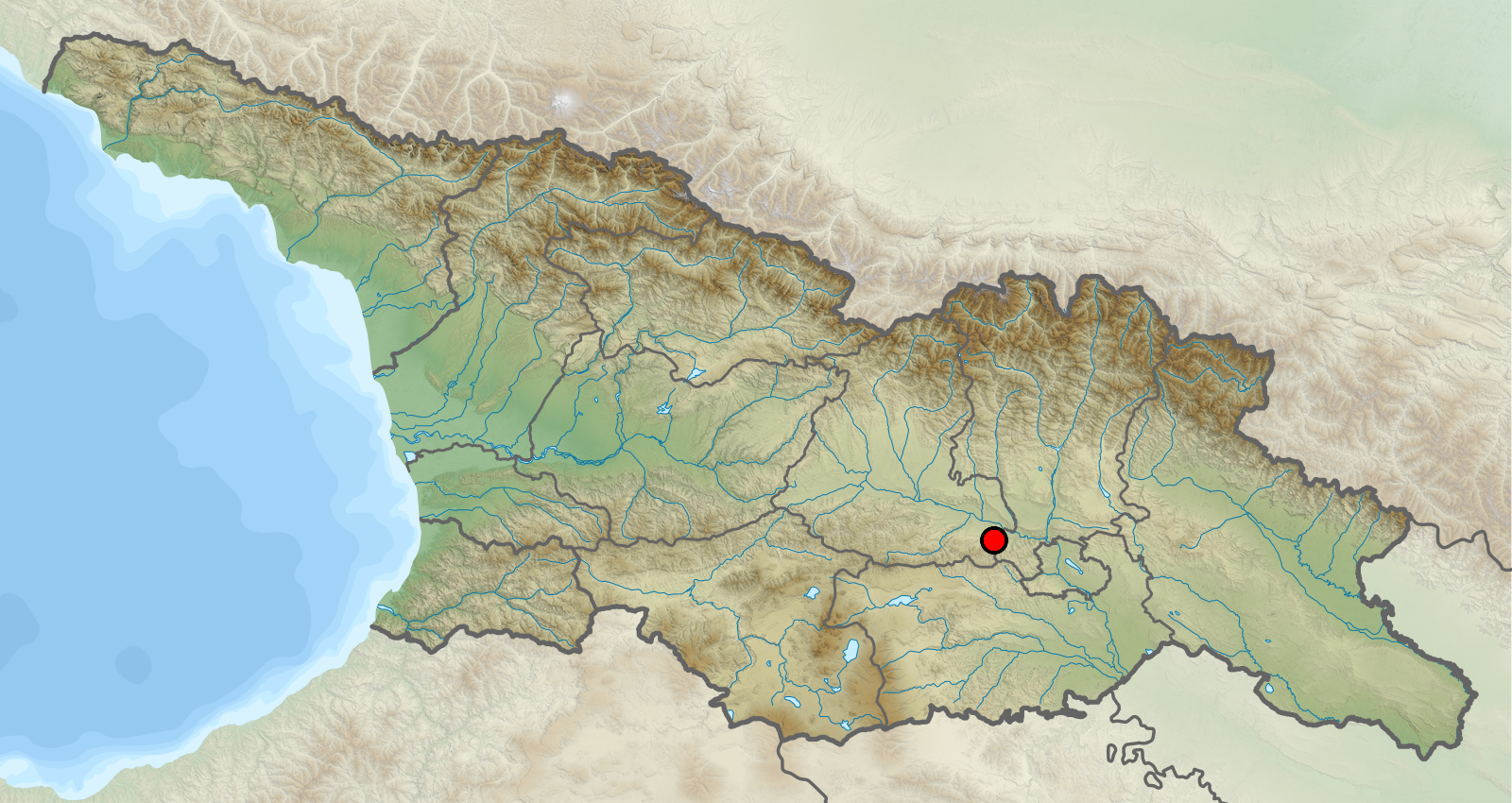
Location of Tsinarekhi and the Maghalashvili monastery.

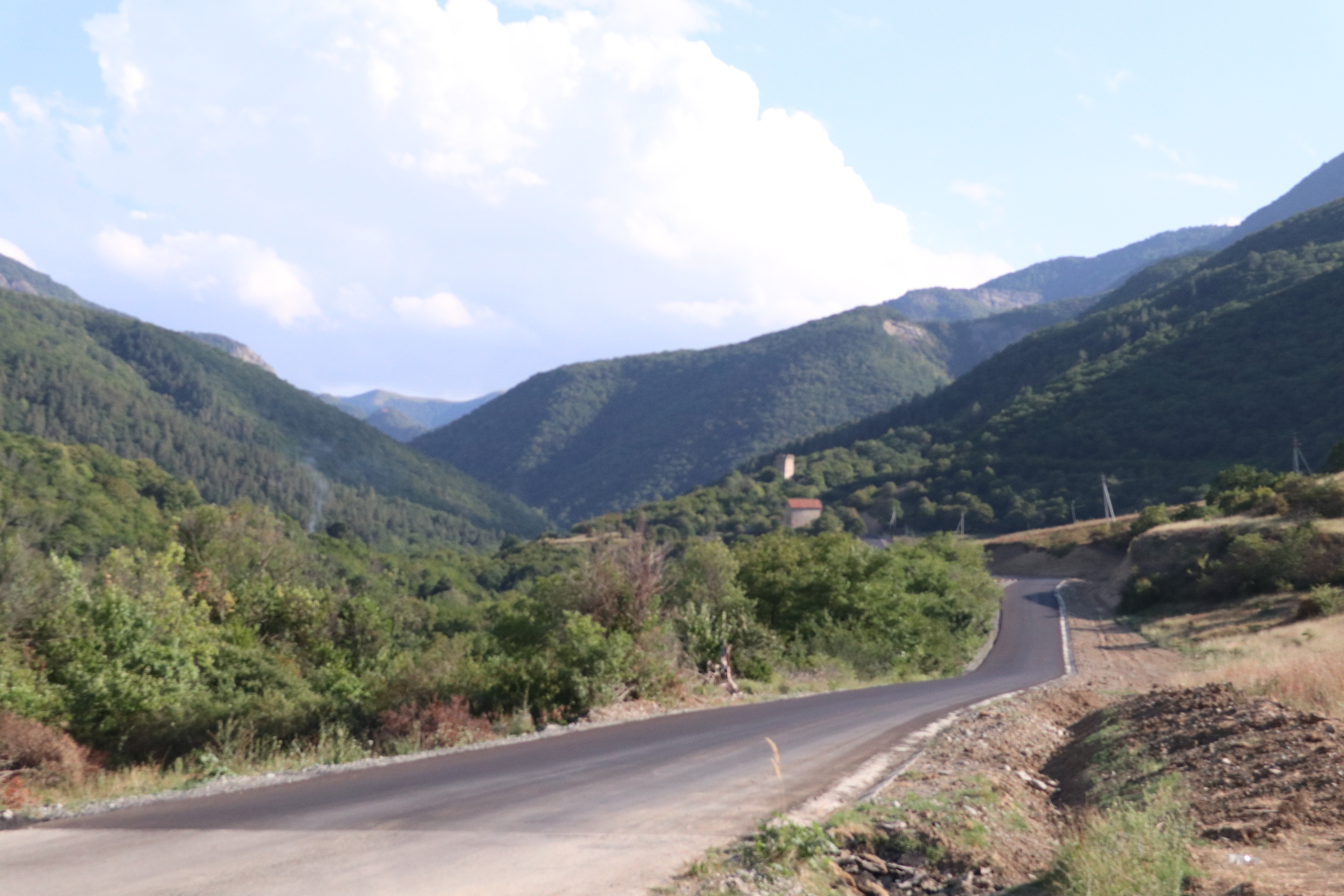
A road that goes past the Maghalashvili monastery.

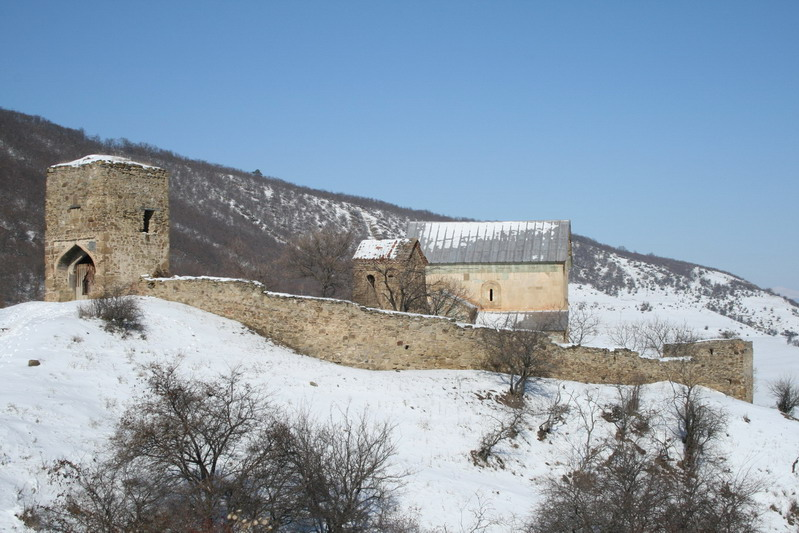
The Maghalashvili familial church and castle ("Maghalaant complex") in Shida Kartli.

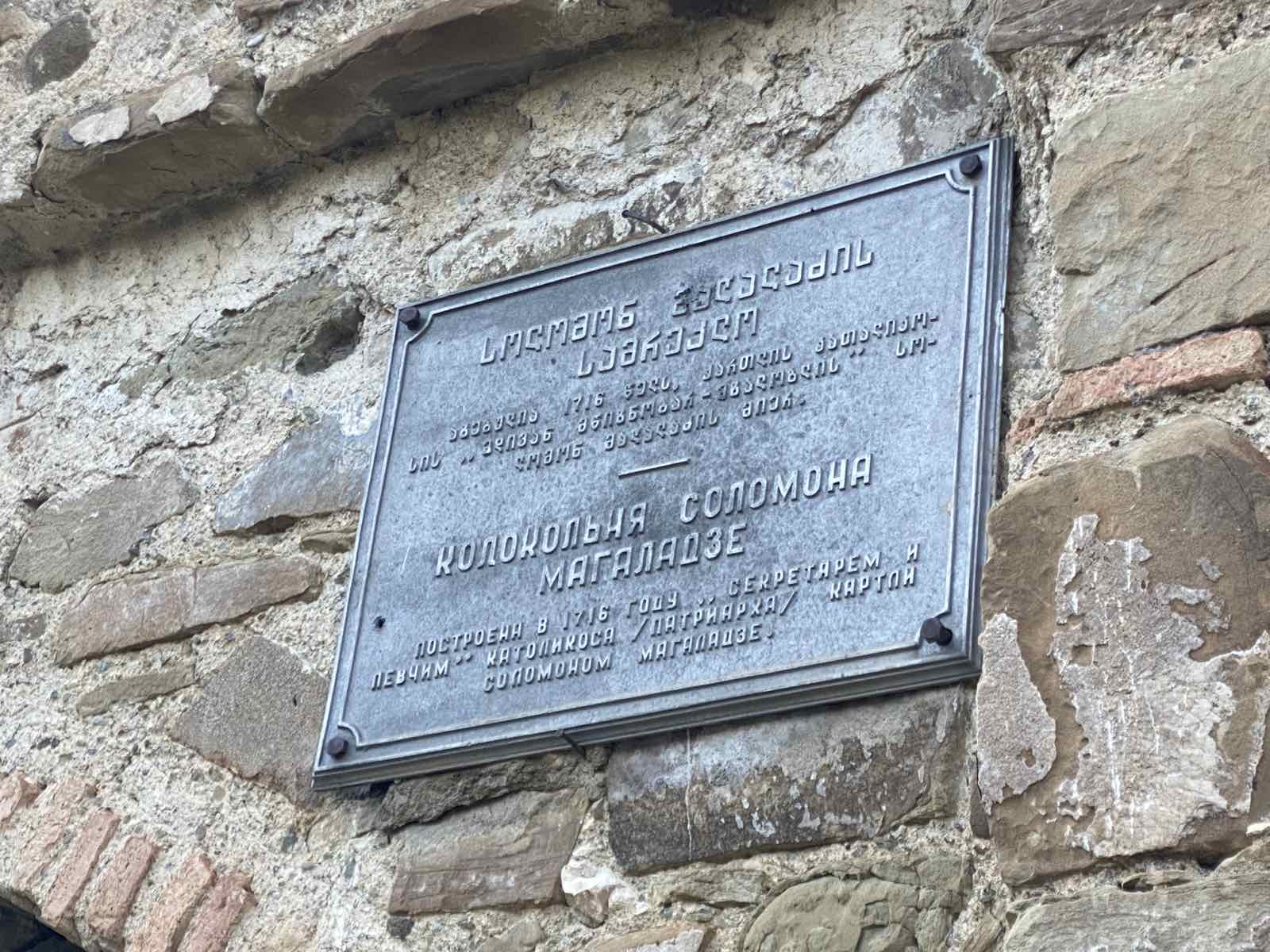
plaque on the wall of the front entrance of the monastery written in Georgian (top) and Russian (bottom): "the bell tower of Solomon Maghaladze was built in 1716 by Catholicos patriarch secretary chancellor choir singer Solomon Maghaladze."

The House of Maghalashvili (Magalashvili; Georgian: მაღალაშვილი) or Maghaladze (Magaladze, მაღალაძე) is a Georgian noble family; according to Cyril Toumanoff, an offshoot of the medieval house of Mkhargrdzeli. The surname Maghalashvili is a combination of Maghala (which means tall or "Great" in Greek language) and shvili (meaning "son" in Georgian language).

== Bibiluridze ==
According to Georgian genealogic tradition of Prince Ioane of Georgia (1768–1830), the Maghalashvili came from Imereti (western Georgia) to Kartli (central Georgia) in 1415, in the reign of Alexander I of Georgia, who granted them an estate at the village of Tsinarekhi in Shida Kartli. An 18th century Georgian Orthodox Christian monastery, named the Maghalashvili or Maghalaanti Castle complex, was also built in their name, located on a hill outside of Tsinarekhi.

By the end of the 17th century, the family had been bestowed with the hereditary office of Mayors of the Palace (Georgian: სახლთუხუცესი, saxlt'-uxuc'esi) of the Church of Georgia. In 1701, the Georgian king Heraclius I elevated the Maghalashvili to a princely rank or tavadi. After Russian annexation of Georgia, the family was incorporated among the princely nobility (knyaz Magalov; Russian: Маѓаловы) of the empire in 1825.

== Tsinarekhi and the Maghalashvili monastery ==
in the reign of Alexander I of Georgia the Maghalashvilis were granted an estate in the village of Tsinarekhi located in the Shida Kartli region of Georgia (country). The family was given several pieces of farmland property in the village. in 1716 the construction of the Maghalshvili castle complex or Maghalashvili monastery began, the monastery was built as a Georgian Orthodox Church or monastery where monks and priests prayed. the monastery was built on a small hill beside a field and the kavtura river about 2 kilometres away from Tsinarekhi. A watchtower entrance with a large wooden door was built in the front with a wall going around the monastery, behind the entrance is another watchtower and a small basement entrance on the left side for the watchtower. the inside of the main building was painted depicting Georgian christian saints and a graveyard was built beside the building.

== Notable people ==
- Nikita Magaloff, Georgian-Russian pianist.
- Simon Magalashvili, Israeli Olympic judoka.
- Ketevan Magalashvili, Georgian painter and art conservator.
- Vakhtang Maghalashvili, Georgian engineer and inventor who vastly developed train technology in the USSR.

== See also ==
- Tsinarekhi
- Keshelashvili
- Kaspi
