= Rkoni Monastery =

Christian monastery in Georgia

- რკონის მონასტერი, რკონი
- Rkoni monastery in Kaspi, Shida Kartli.

Religion
- Affiliation: Georgian Orthodox Church
- Region: Shida Kartli
- Ownership: Georgian Orthodox Church
- Status: Functional

Location
- Location: 41°48′27″N 44°13′29″E
- Municipality: Kaspi Municipality
- Country: Georgia
- Interactive map of Rkoni Monastery

Architecture
- Style: Ancient Georgian
- Established: 642–645 AD
- Elevation: 700 m (2,297 ft)

Rkoni Monastery, Rkonis Monastery, Rkonis church or Rkoni (Georgian: რკონის მონასტერი, რკონი or რკონის ეკლესია) is an ancient Georgian Orthodox monastery and church located in the Kaspi Municipality of the Shida Kartli province of Georgia. The monastery was built in the 7th century AD on the side of a mountain, the surrounding area is a valley with mountain chains on both sides covering most of the area which makes it hard to reach and very isolated. In the middle of the valley is the river Tedzami, since the monastery is on the left mountain chain (from a hiker's perspective) tourists have to cross the river by using the Rkoni bridge, a semicircular bridge made of stone that crosses the river onto the other mountain chain where the monastery is located. The surrounding area of the monastery is called Rkoni. Rkoni monastery is near the village of Chachubeti, 5.63 km (3.49 mi) southwest of the village and near a few other churches and monasteries like St. George church, Ikvi church, didi Ikvi St. George church and Saorbisi St. George church.

In the 12th–13th centuries, important trade and military-strategic roads connected Shida Kartli with Javakheti, Trialeti and the Middle East. In 1400, Tamerlane's armies raided the village and the surrounding churches and monasteries. In the 16th–17th centuries, Rkoni was still a well-fortified place, but it was becoming empty gradually. The monastery complex has been rebuilt many times, with three layers of construction: 7th, 13th-14th and 16th–17th centuries. In 1905, a workshop-laboratory was established in Rkoni, where weapons and explosive substances were made for the rebellion

== History ==
=== Construction, 7th century AD ===
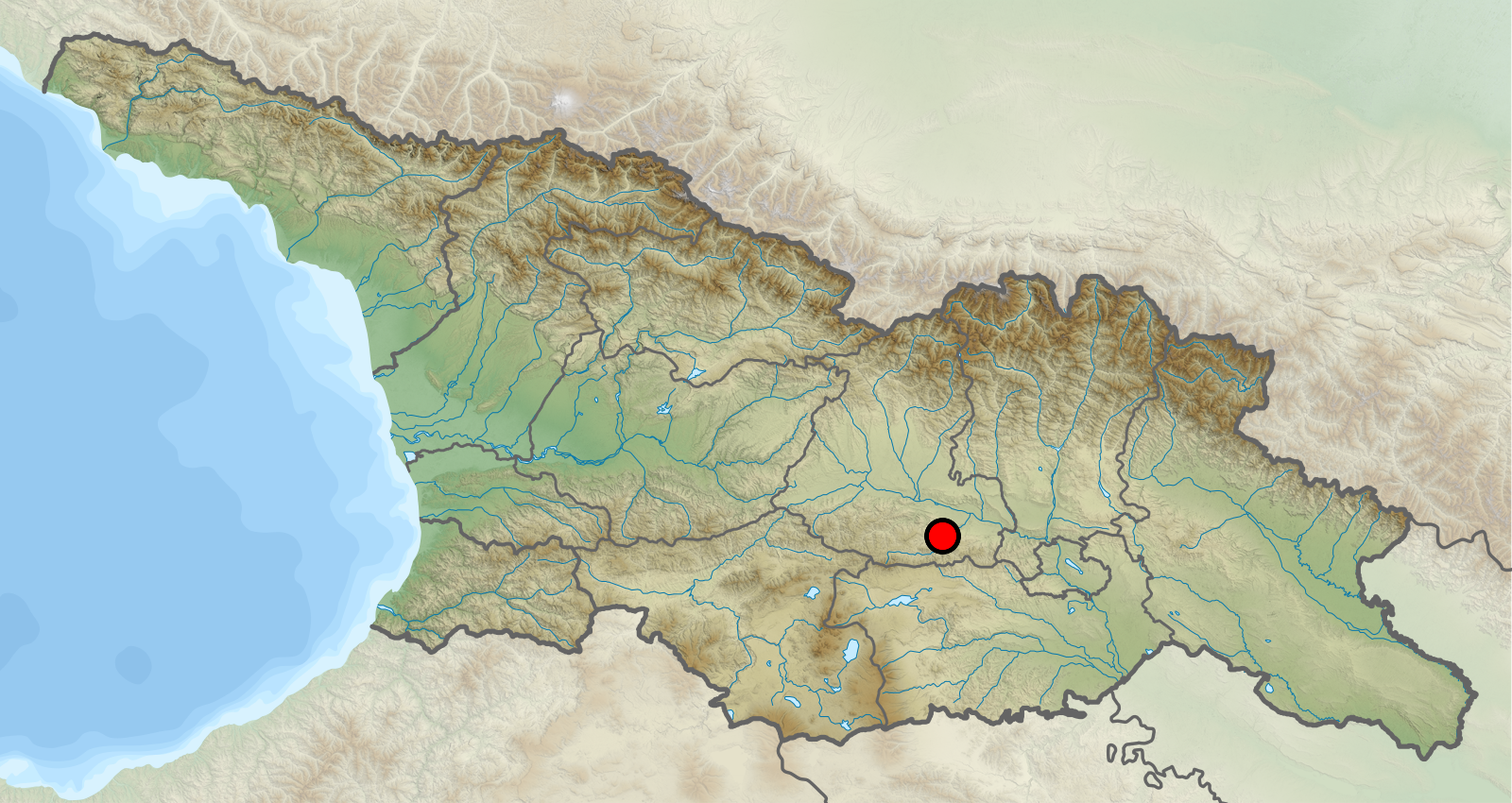
Rkoni monastery location map.

Rkoni monastery complex architectural plan.

Rkoni Monastery was constructed in the 7th century AD (the exact year is unknown, but it is believed to be constructed somewhere between 642 and 645). The monastery was constructed for several purposes, at the time when the construction started, many army outposts were needed for the Arab invasion of Georgia so the building not only served the purpose of being a Georgian Christian Orthodox monastery for monks to pray in but also a military outpost to defend against the invaders. The monastery's high altitude and watchtower were also used to observe the nearby area and valley. The Rkoni fortress was also built Nearby at the entrance of the valley also for the purpose of defending against invaders. Rkoni monastery was also a good strategic location that was used for trading because it connected Shida Kartli to Javakheti, Trialeti and to Armenia and then the Middle East. The physical features of Rkoni made it hard for enemies to go through as it was covered with dense forests, hills, extremely rough terrain and a very narrow valley, Rkoni was built generally in a very isolated area. During the Arab invasion, civilians in the nearby area used the monastery as a refuge.

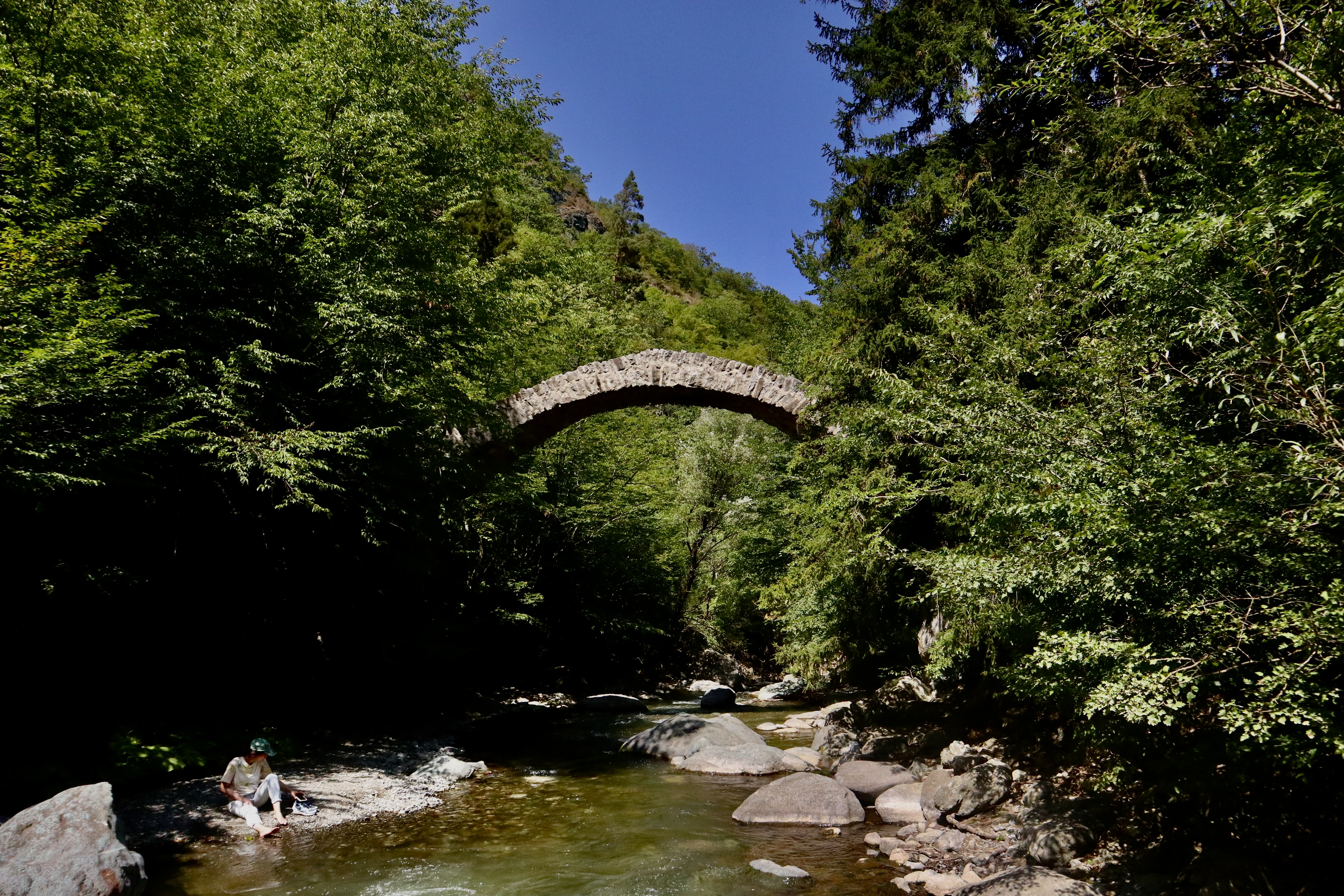
Queen Tamar bridge crossing into the Rkoni monastery, built in the 11th century.

=== Construction of the Queen Tamar bridge, 11th century ===
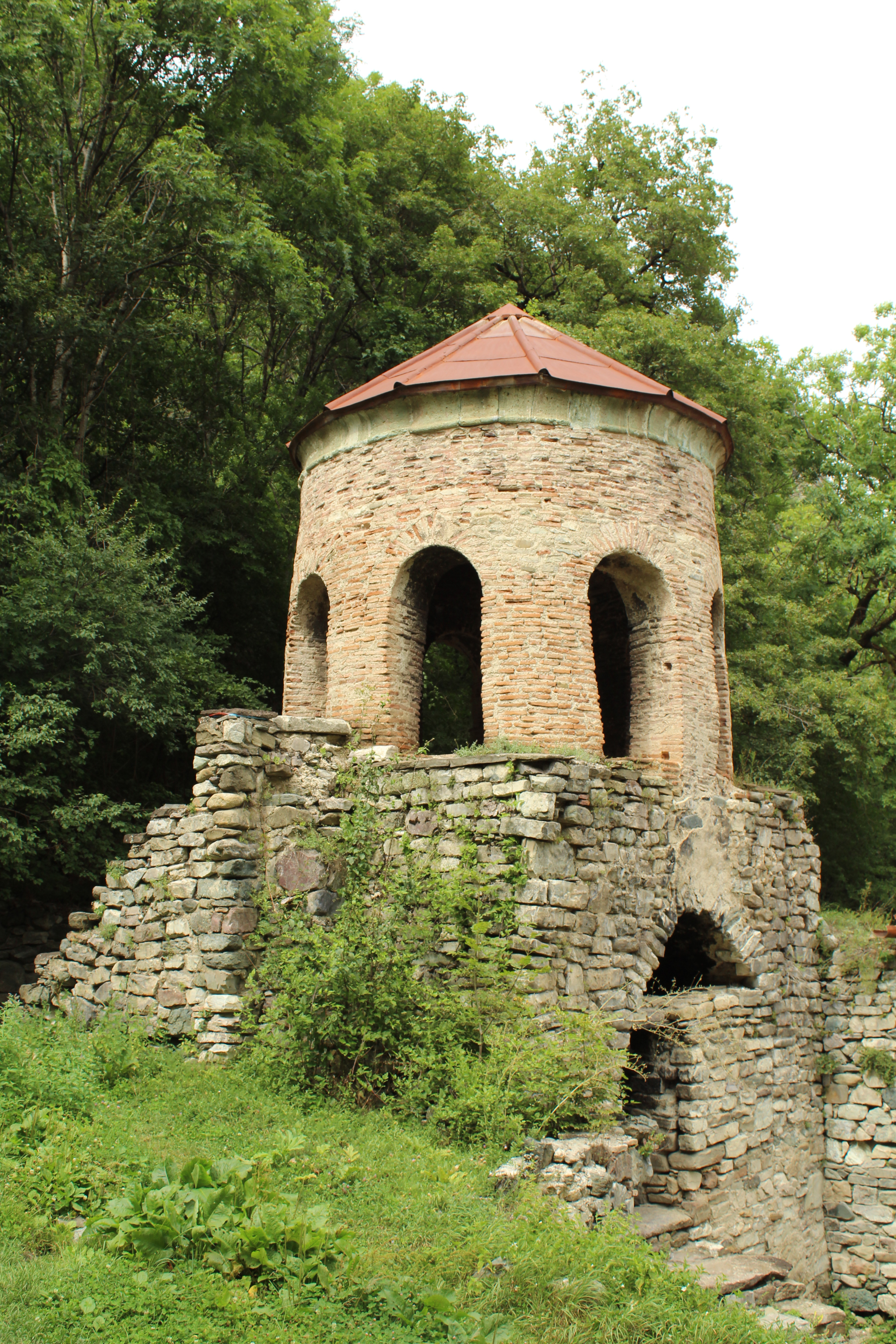
Rkoni monastery bell tower, built in the 17th century.

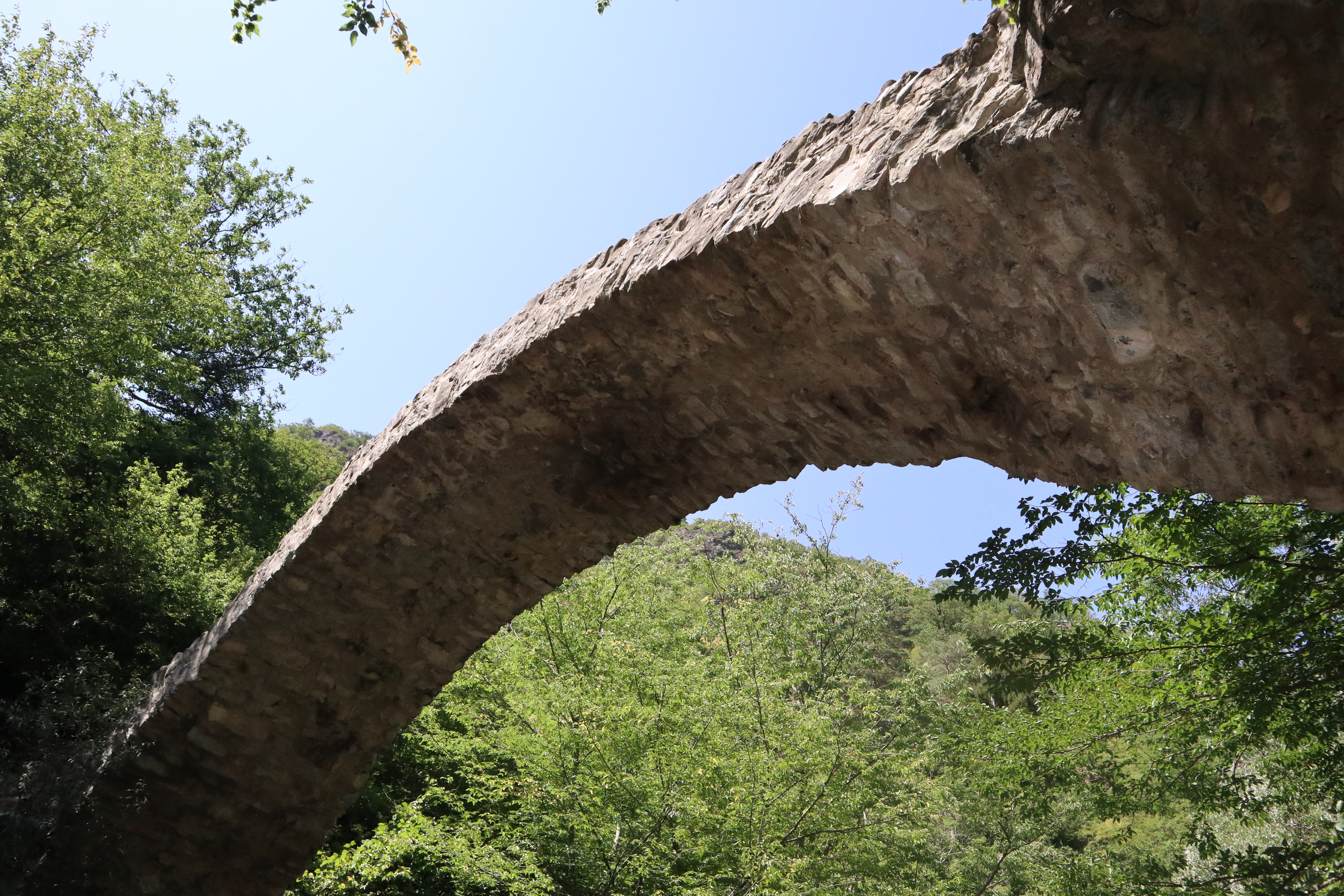
Bottom view of the Queen Tamar bridge, Rkoni monastery

The Queen Tamar bridge was a semicircular Stone Bridge that was built in the 11th century. The bridge was built on the two sides of the valley mountain chains for the purpose of crossing onto the other side where the monastery was, the supports were built to lean against a natural rocky foundations and was built from pieces of stones on a solution of lime, the stones and lime were brought from the river below which had a large amount. The bridge is 12.5 metres long and 2.2 metres wide. The bridge was named after Tamar of Georgia because she was believed to have owned a summer residence in that area.

=== 7th–13th century ===
The three-nave basilica was from the second half of the 7th century, the Church of the Assumption. The columns' arches are almost semicircular. The church's roof is vaulted. Three entrances are present. There are pieces of artwork from various eras still present within. The main space's last remaining pieces date to the 12th century. On the south side of the door, which was painted in the late 10th century, there is also a depiction of a secular figure. The chapel's artwork is from the time of the feudal system. In the latter half of the 13th century, the monastery's gate was constructed. The exteriors of An attractive half-column arcade decorates the gate. decorations are used to embellish the window, arch, and column bases. The chapel in the hall dates from the second part of the thirteenth century. The chapel's façade are made of cut stone and embellished with carvings and beautiful arches.

=== Destruction of the monastery, 1400 ===
in 1400 during the Mongol invasions of Georgia and Europe, the Mongolian military leader and conqueror Timur invaded Georgia. The raids were conducted by armies that were made up of tens of thousands of soldiers, Timur's armies ended up traveling and raiding the area that is Kaspi Municipality today. Some raiders found the Rkoni monastery while raiding the area and destroyed it in the year 1400. The monastery was rebuilt around the same time when the Mongol invasion was quickly halted because of Timur's death in 1405.

=== Construction during the 14th–18th century ===
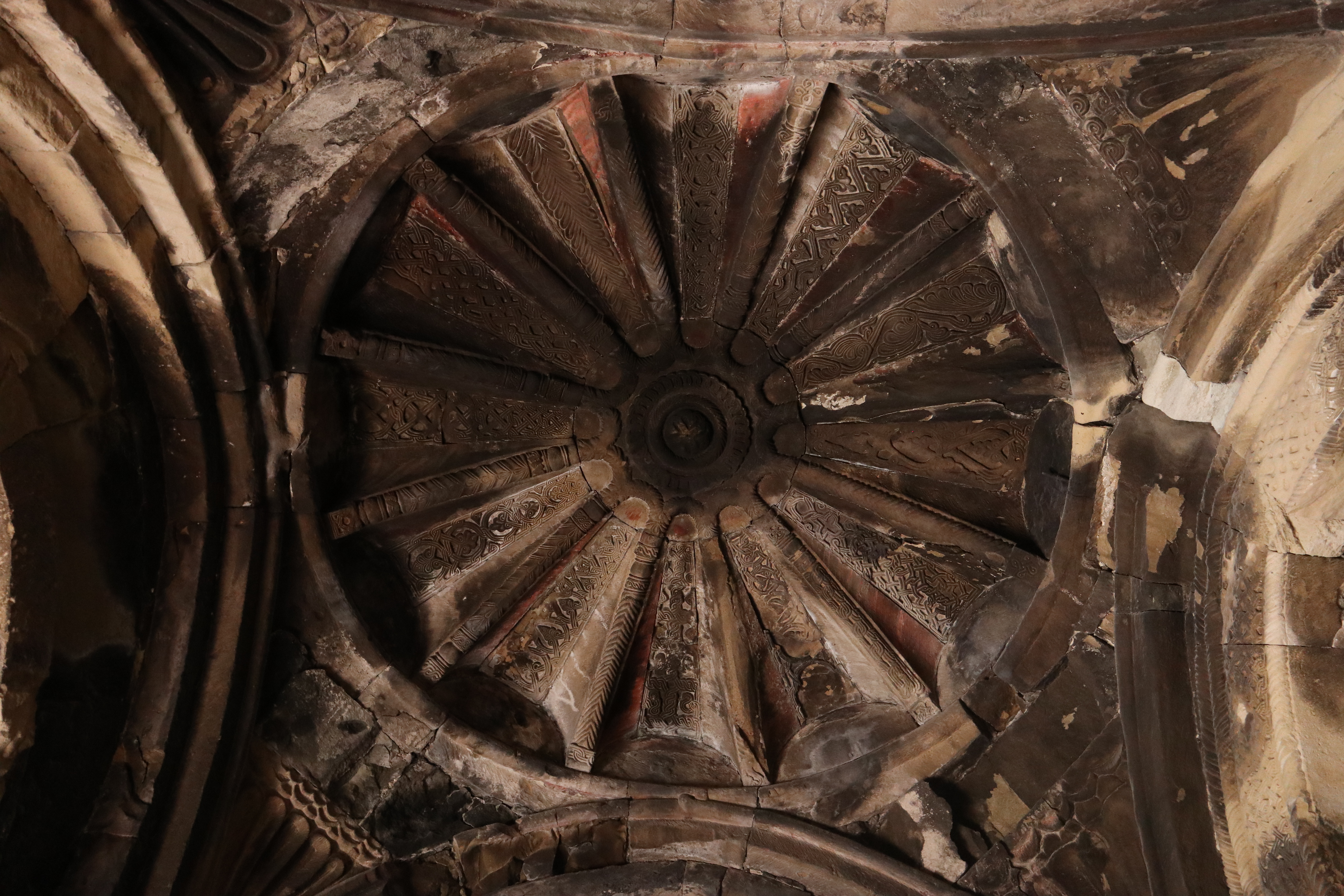
Inside view of the dome in Rkoni monastery.

In the church, paintings from the 13th–14th centuries have been preserved in fragments. To the north-west of the main temple is a refectory that was built in the 13th–14th centuries. It is made of stone fragments and has a vaulted ceiling supported by six arches. The Refectory of the monastery was destroyed and is currently broken. To the southwest of the refectory is a Tower. There are now only two stories of the skyscraper left. The first and bottom levels each have one window. The first floor has the entryway. The two-story bell tower, which was built in the 16th and 17th centuries, is situated northwest of the main church. On the bottom level, there are still remnants of the building's modern paintings. The Baptist Church, which was built during the XIII and XIV centuries, is situated to the south of the Church of the Assumption. It is a hall church constructed with cut stones of various sizes. A circular roof surrounds the room. Arcades that are ornamental are added to the north, east, and west facades. Later, the church's gate was constructed on its western side. On the grounds of the monastery complex at Rkoni, there is a structure called "Tamar Bridge" that spans the Tedzami River. It was created between the years XII and XIII. The bridge is 12.5 metres long and 2.2 metres wide. The bridge's imposts are made of stone with lime mortar and rest on a foundation of natural rock. It is kept in its original state. Here was where the route that connected Shida Kartli and Trialeti crossed.

=== Military workshop-laboratory, 1905 ===
During the Russian Revolution of 1905 the Rkoni monastery was used as a clandestine military equipment workshop-laboratory, Firearms, Explosives and other military equipment was produced in the monastery in secret without the Russian authorities knowing. The monastery was used for its isolated location which helped the rebels of the Bolsheviks, Mensheviks, and the Socialist Revolutionaries produce weapons to aid the 1905 revolution without the Okhrana discovering the operation. After the failed revolution, the monastery was abandoned and not used for a few decades until it was re-discovered and rebuilt. decades of being unattended caused the monastery to be partially damaged.

== Architecture ==
The Rkoni monastery is a three-nave basilica that dates to the seventh century. Columns divide the boats from one another. Those same columns create semicircular arches with a nearly semicircular shape. high ceiling. The church is accessible by three doors. Parts of the ornamentation have survived, including painted shards and ornate arches. Every piece of the picture corresponds to a particular period of time. On caps, bases, columns, and columns themselves are lovely embellishments. The prayer room was built in the thirteenth century. Hewn stone, murals, and arches are used to embellish the prayer room's exterior. The complex's refectory, which is situated in the northwest of the area and was constructed out of stone fragments, is today severely damaged.

In the southwest, not far from the refectory, is a tower. Only three levels have been preserved; the first and second floors each have one window, and the entrance is on the second floor. To the northwest of the main temple is the bell tower, which rises two stories. Only the ground floor's pieces of the artwork were saved. The second one has a construction that is more like to a gazebo, eight open arches, and a hewn cornice. The Church of the Baptist is located south of the first church that was previously described. This stone-processed building is a church with a large hall. The vault is shaped like a cylinder. The exteriors Except for the south, all three cardinal directions are embellished with arches. Later, a vestibule from the west was constructed.

== See also ==
- Kaspi Municipality
- Shida Kartli
- Georgia
- Georgian Orthodox Church
