= Kaspi Municipality =

Coordinates: 41.9167°N 44.4167°E

Kaspi Municipality კასპის მუნიციპალიტეტი
- Municipality
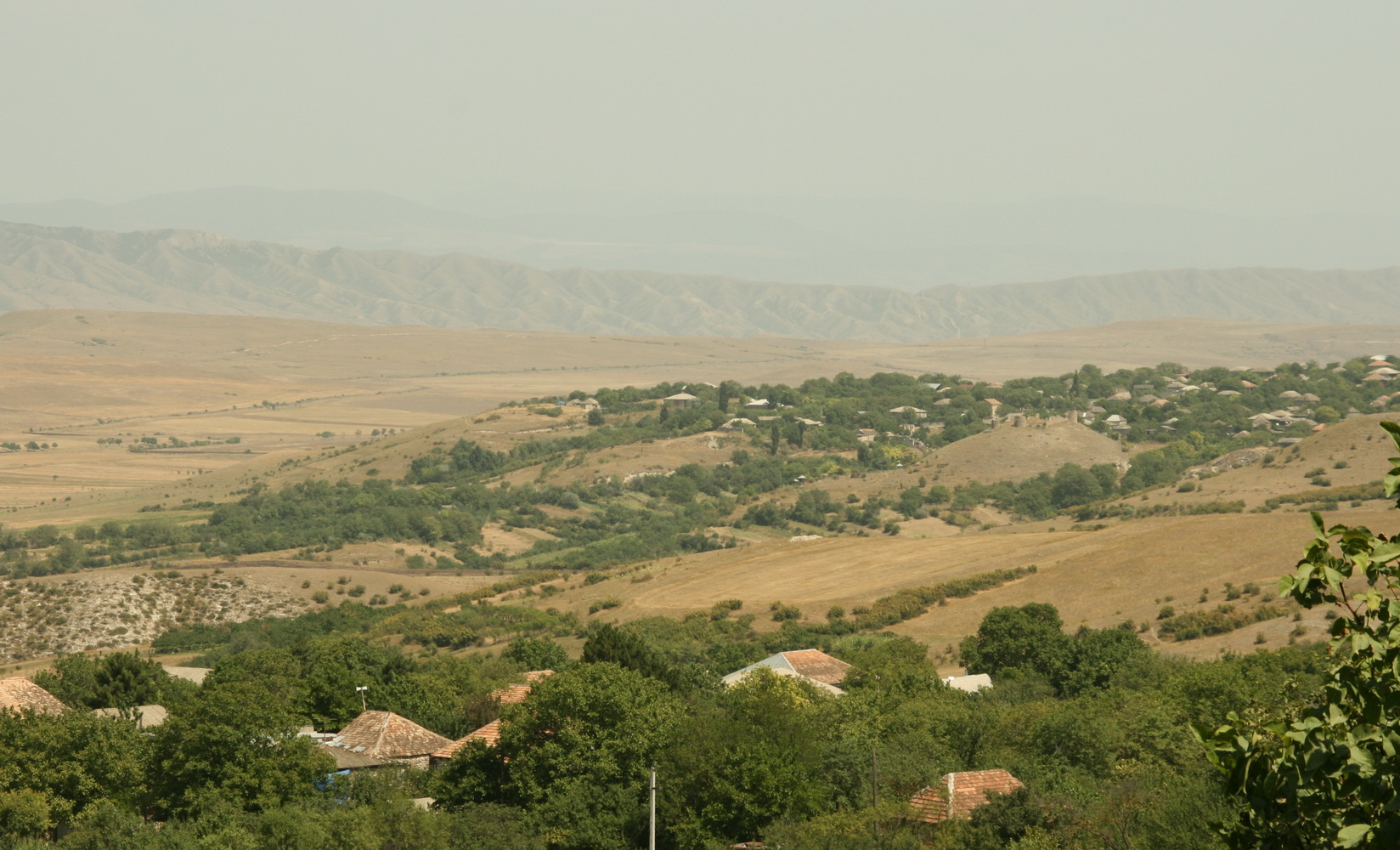
- a village in Kaspi municipality

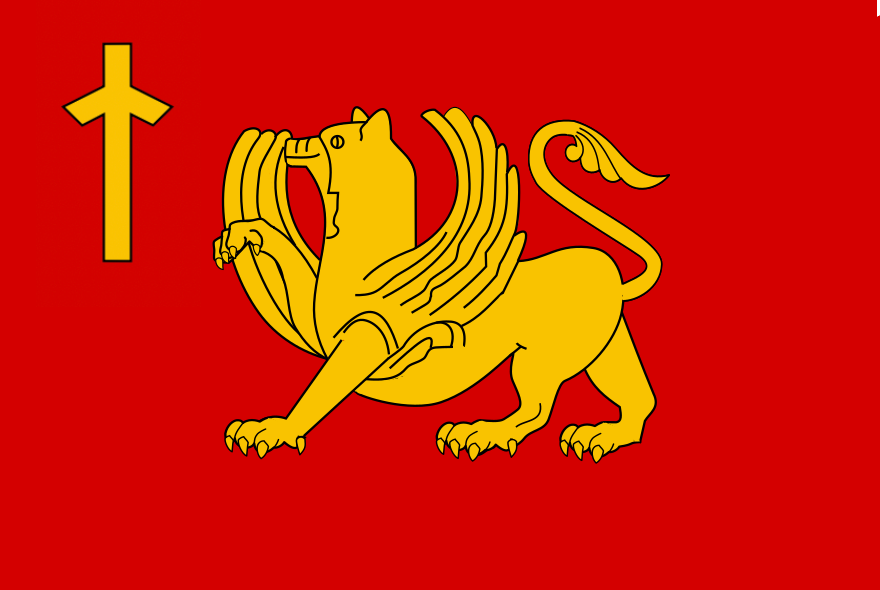
- Flag Seal

- Location of Kaspi Municipality in Georgia
- Country: Georgia
- Region: Shida Kartli
- Capital: Kaspi
- various: 1 town, 71 villages

Area
  - Total: 802 km^{2} (310 sq mi)

Population (2014)
  - Total: 43,771
  - Density: 54.6/km^{2} (141/sq mi)
- Time zone: UTC+4
- Website: https://kaspi.gov.ge/

Kaspi (Georgian: კასპის მუნიციპალიტეტი) is a district of Georgia, in the region of Shida Kartli. Given a District status within Transcaucasian SFSR in 1930. District center is Kaspi.

== Geography ==
The district occupies Shida Kartli plain, stretching on both sides of the Kura River - bordering southern parts of Greater Caucasus to the North and Trialeti Range to the South. Bigger rivers crossing the District are Kura and Ksani.

District population is 43,771, population density is 55 per km^{2} (2014). There are 71 villages and 1 town in the District.

District economy is focused on agriculture, there are a few manufactures producing building materials and wine/spirits.

There are a number of historical and architectural sites in the District, including Rkoni Monastery, Samtavisi and Kvatakhevi churches.

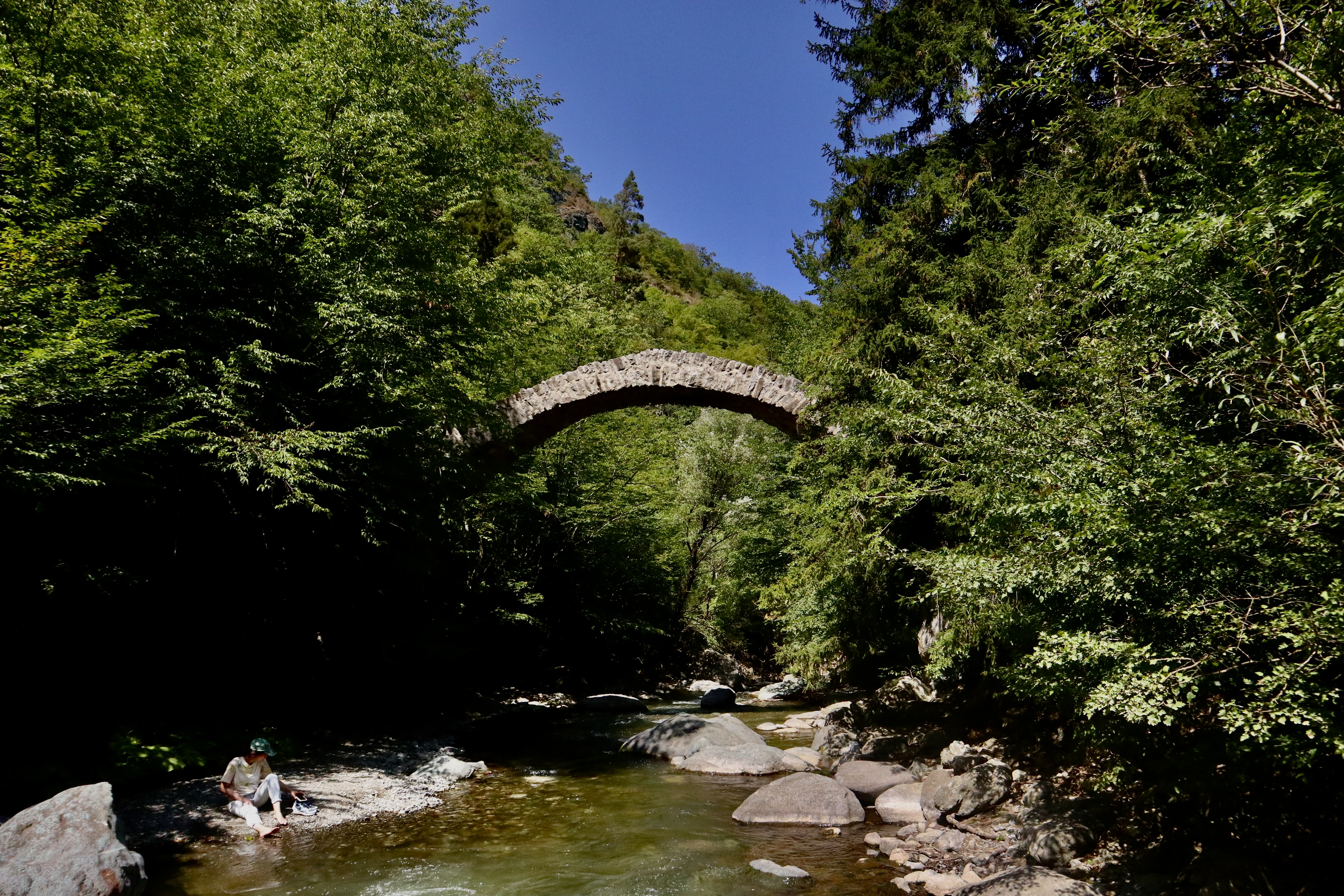
Medieval Bridge crossing into Rkoni Monastery.

== Kavtiskhevi kurgans ==
Near the village of Kavtiskhevi in Kaspi Municipality some very ancient kurgans have been found. They were excavated by Makharadze in 2007.

Materials recovered from these excavations can be related to remains from the metal-working Late Chalcolithic site of Leilatepe on the Karabakh steppe. Also, at Soyuqbulaq, Agstafa, there are similar kurgans.

Also, the earliest level at the multi-period site of Berikldeebi in Kvemo Kartli is relevant. These discoveries reveal the presence of early 4th millennium kurgans in the southern Caucasus.

== Politics ==
Kaspi Municipal Assembly (Georgian: კასპის საკრებულო) is a representative body in Kaspi Municipality. currently consisting of 30 members. The council is assembled into session regularly, to consider subject matters such as code changes, utilities, taxes, city budget, oversight of city government and more. Municipal Assembly and Mayor are elected every four-year. The last election was held in October 2021.

Party	2017	2021	Current Municipal Assembly
Georgian Dream	28	19	
Ahali		6 (Note: Split from UNM.)	
United National Movement	2	2	
For Georgia		2	
Alliance of Patriots	2	1	
European Georgia	1		
Labour Party	1		
Total	34	30	

== See also ==
- List of municipalities in Georgia (country)
- Kaspi
- Tsinarekhi
- Rkoni Monastery
