= Tsinarekhi =

Coordinates: 41°50′11″N 44°27′00″E

Tsinarekhi წინარეხი
- Village
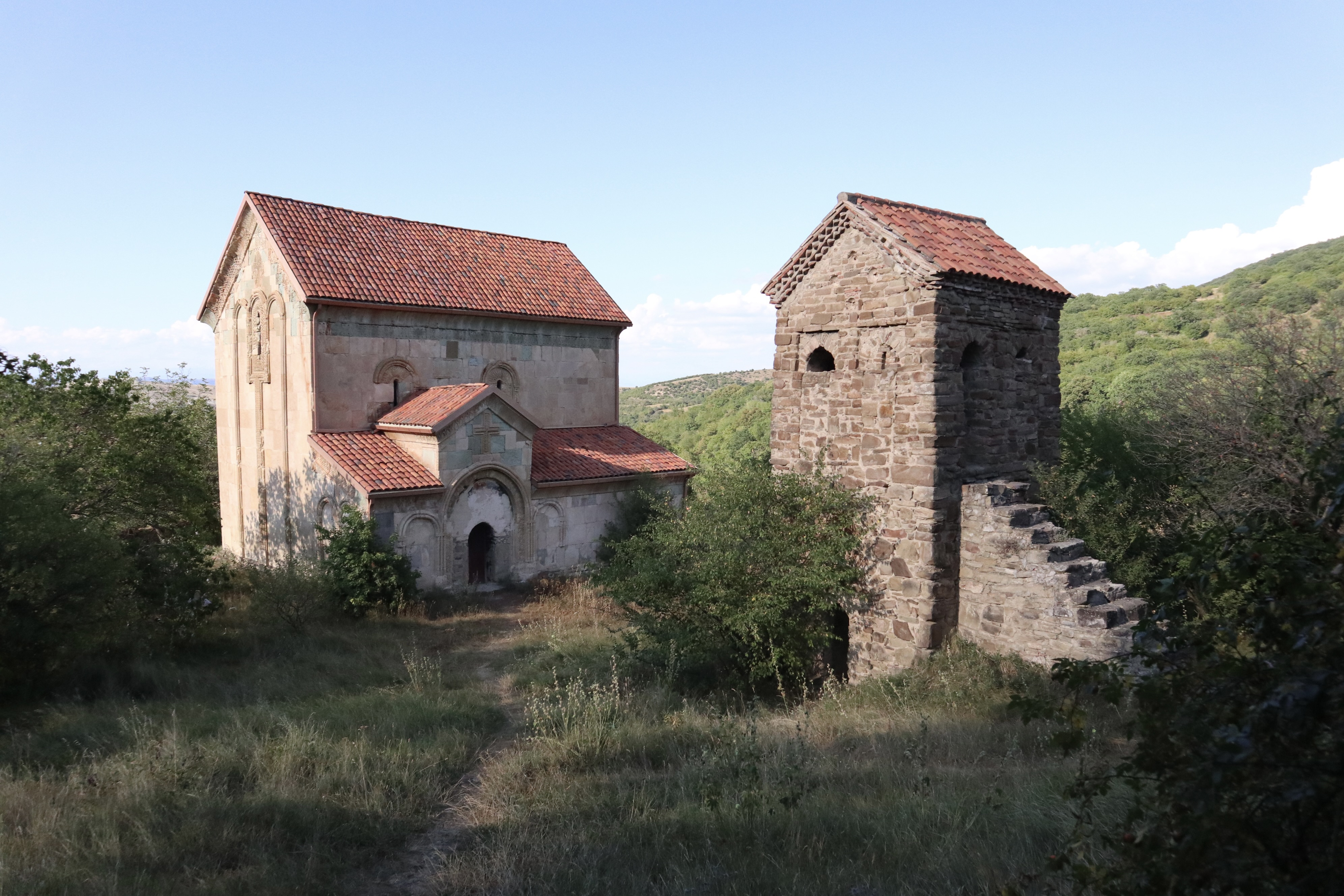

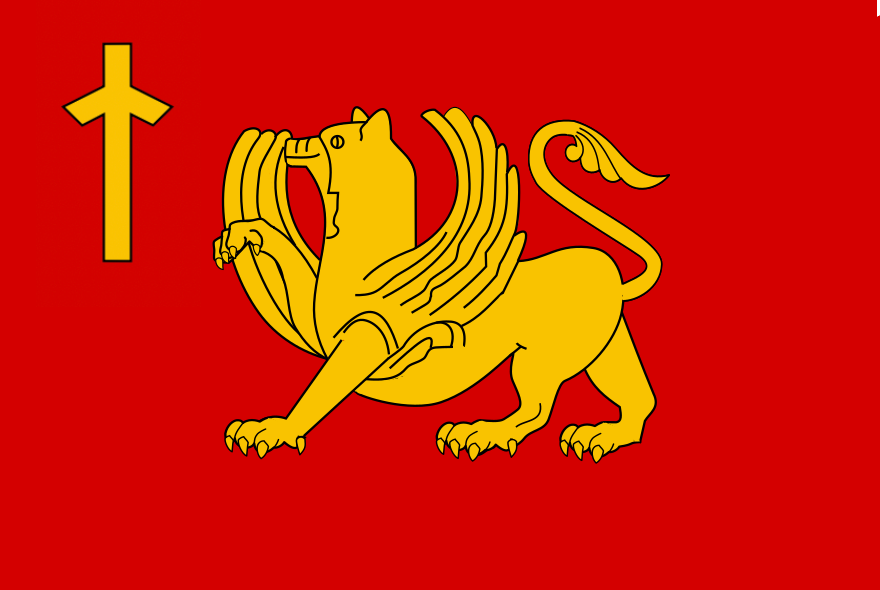
- Flag Coat of arms

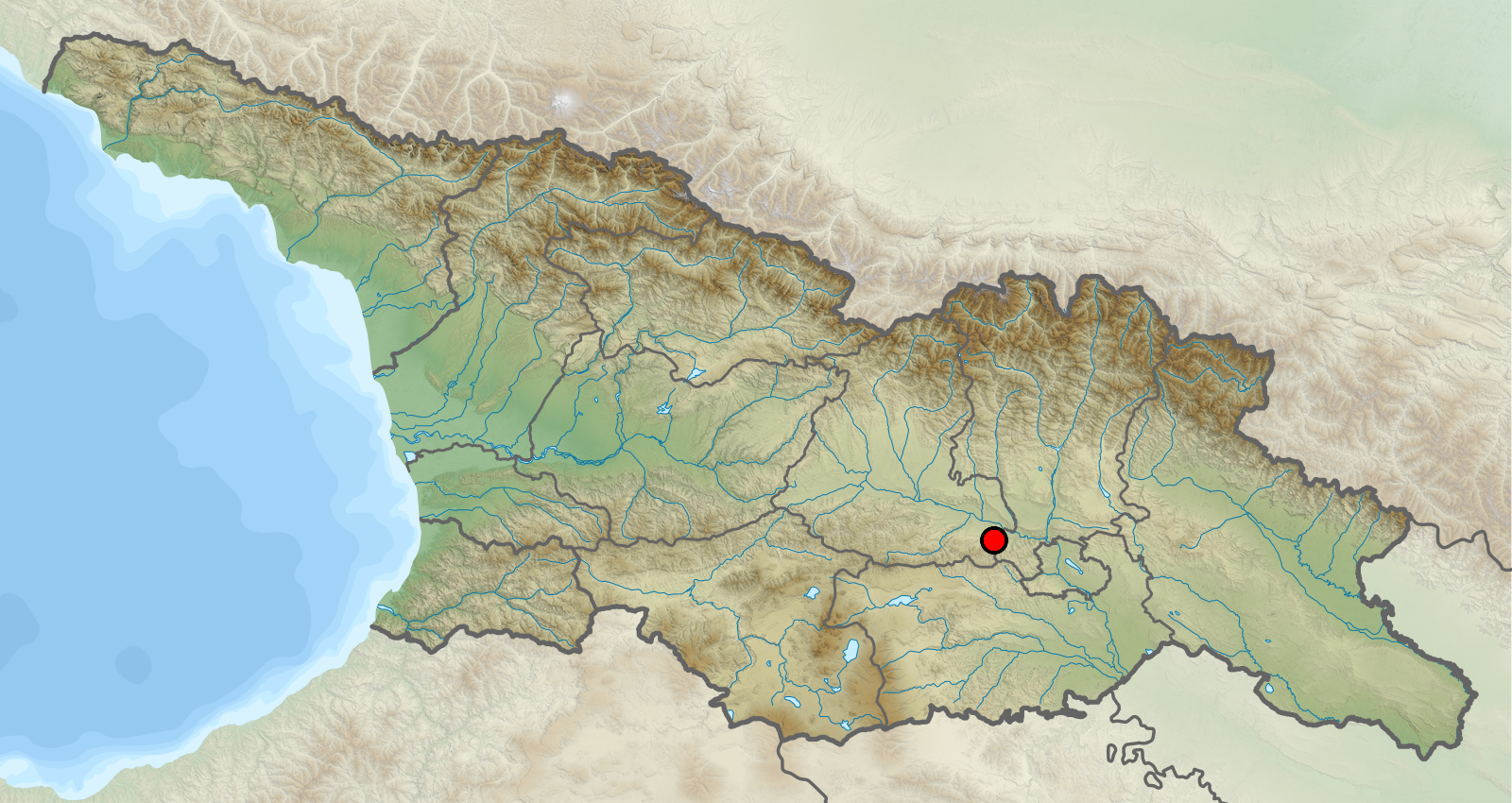
- Country: Georgia
- region: Shida Kartli
- municipality: Kaspi Municipality

Area
  - Total: 0.29 km^{2} (0.11 sq mi)
- Elevation: 720 m (2,360 ft)

Population (2019)
  - Total: 500

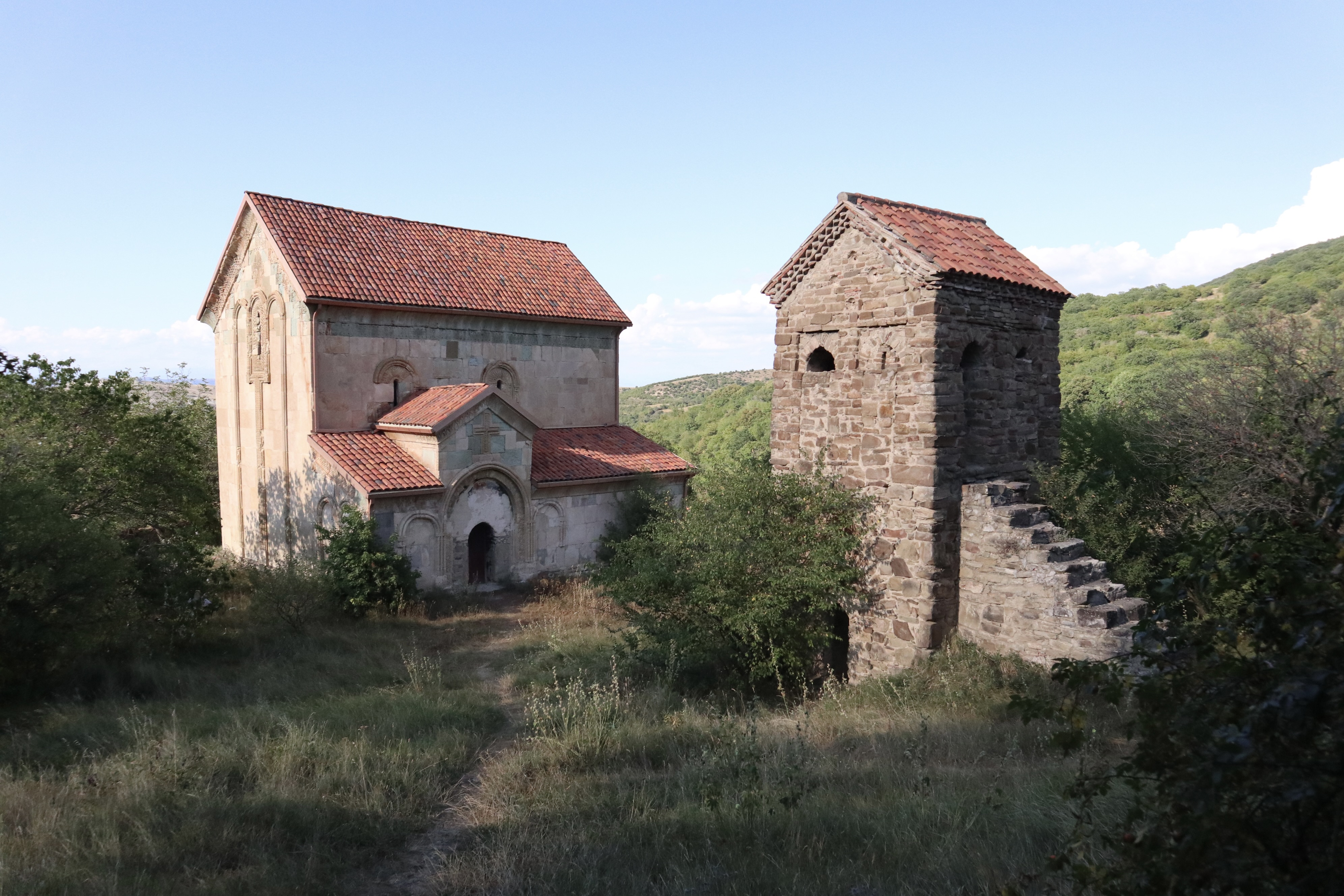
Maghalashvili castle complex.

Tsinarekhi (Georgian: წინარეხი) is a small village located in eastern Georgia in the Kaspi Municipality of the Shida Kartli region, Tsinarekhi is located 10 km south of the town of Kaspi. The surrounding villages and communities are Gomisjvari, Telatgori, Idleti, Lavriskhevi. Tsinarekhi is located on the banks of the Kavturi River (the right tributary of Mtkvari). It is 720 meters above sea level and 32 km from Tbilisi.

== Community ==
The village and its community is mainly made up of farmers, these include shepherds, dairy farmers, fruit farmers and other crop farmers. The population of the village lives in cabins and traditional Georgian houses, some of the properties in the village are summer vacation homes for families that live in larger towns and cities. Most families in the village bare the surname Keshelashvili as it is the place of origin, another common last name is Maghalashvili. Around the village are several historical watchtowers, small castles, houses, monasteries and churches like the Kvatakhevi Monastery on the bottom of the mountain chain 5 km south of the village. Tsinarekhi also has two public schools, one of which, located in the centre of the village, is more than 100 years old and was established by Ilia Chavchavadze, the second school is 0.5 km north of the village.

== Maghalashvili church complex ==
During the reign of Alexander I of Georgia, the Maghalashvili family was granted an estate in Tsinarekhi. The family was given several pieces of farmland property in the village. In 1716, the construction of the Maghalashvili castle complex or Maghalashvili monastery began. The monastery was built as a Georgian Orthodox Church or monastery where monks and priests prayed. The monastery was built on a small hill beside a field and the Kavtura River about 2 kilometres away from Tsinarekhi. A watchtower entrance with a large wooden door was built in the front with a wall going around the monastery, behind the entrance is another watchtower and a small basement entrance on the left side for the watchtower. The inside of the main building was painted depicting Georgian Christian saints and a graveyard was built beside the building.

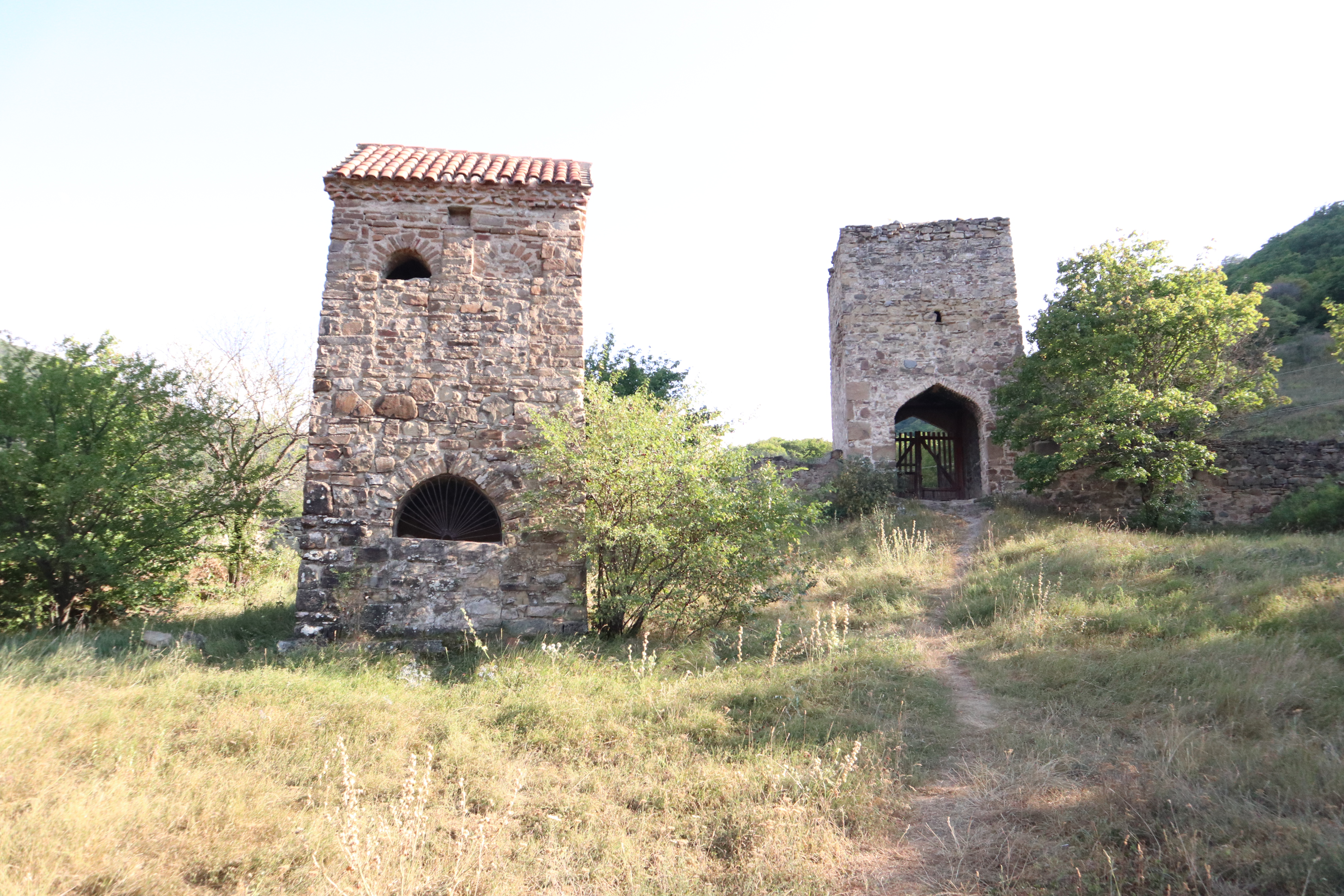
Maghalashvili monastery watchtower and gate.

== Weather ==
Tsinarekhi is a relatively warm place, since it is located on the South Eastern part of Georgia it experiences a dry moderate continental climate with very hot long summers. The elevation in Tsinarekhi is about 720-804 metres and since its located on a higher elevation it experiences short but cold winters. In January the weather is a little warm reaching about 12°C (53.6°F) and going down to -6°C (21.2°F), from January to May the temperature rises to a maximum of 26°C (78.8°F) and in the summer from June to September the temperature can rise to a maximum of 38°C (100.4°F). during autumn and winter from October to December the temperature goes down to a high of 31°C (87.8°F) and a low of 5°C (41°F) to -3°C (26.6°F).

Climate data for Tsinarekhi
Month	Jan	Feb	Mar	Apr	May	Jun	Jul	Aug	Sep	Oct	Nov	Dec	Year
Mean daily maximum °C (°F)	12 (54)	20 (68)	23 (73)	28 (82)	35 (95)	35 (95)	36 (97)	37 (99)	27 (81)	21 (70)	16 (61)	11 (52)	25 (77)
Mean daily minimum °C (°F)	−6 (21)	−4 (25)	−2 (28)	0 (32)	9 (48)	15 (59)	15 (59)	17 (63)	11 (52)	6 (43)	2 (36)	−4 (25)	5 (41)
Source: https://www.accuweather.com/en/ge/tsinarekhi/805074/april-weather/805074

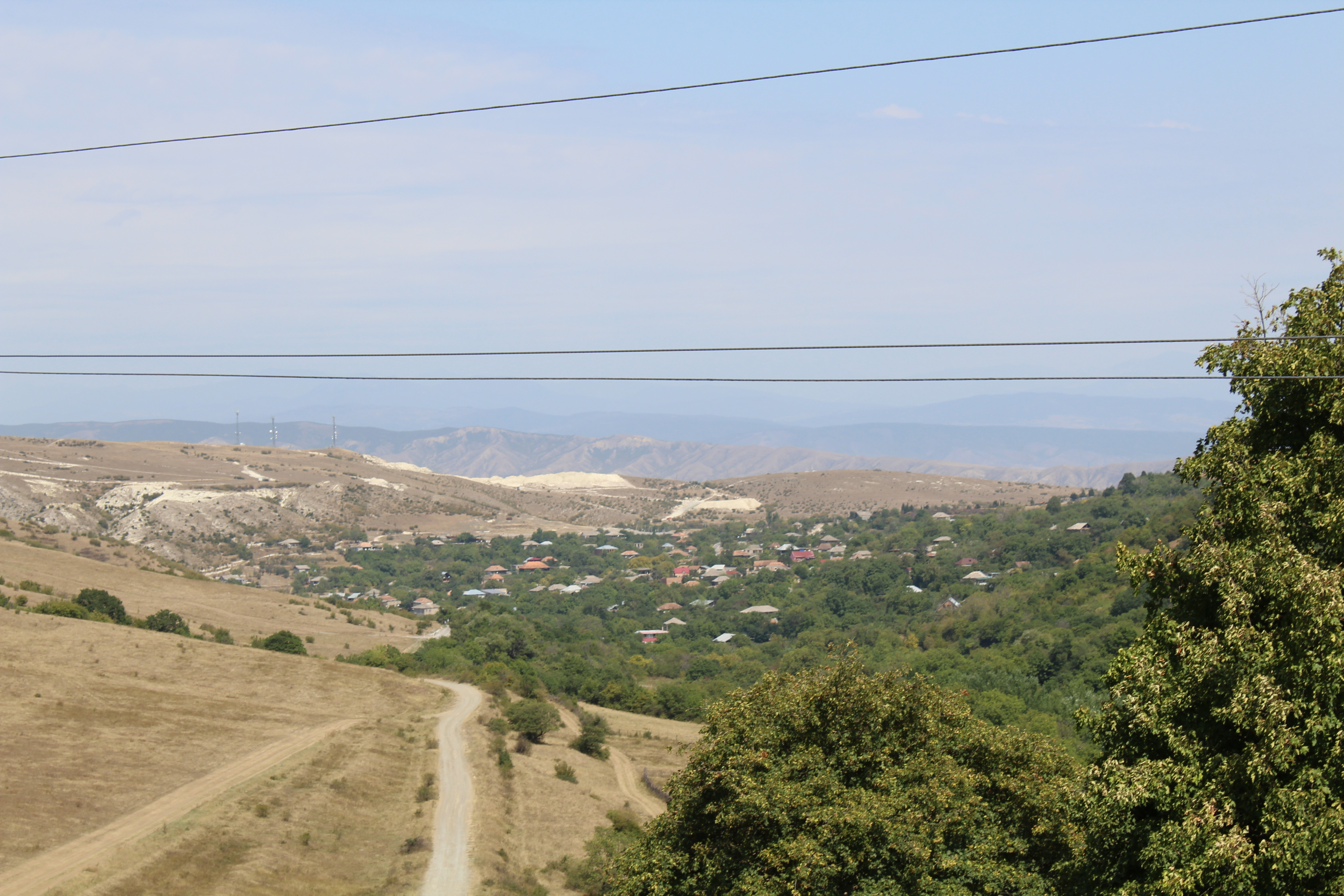
Tsinarekhi

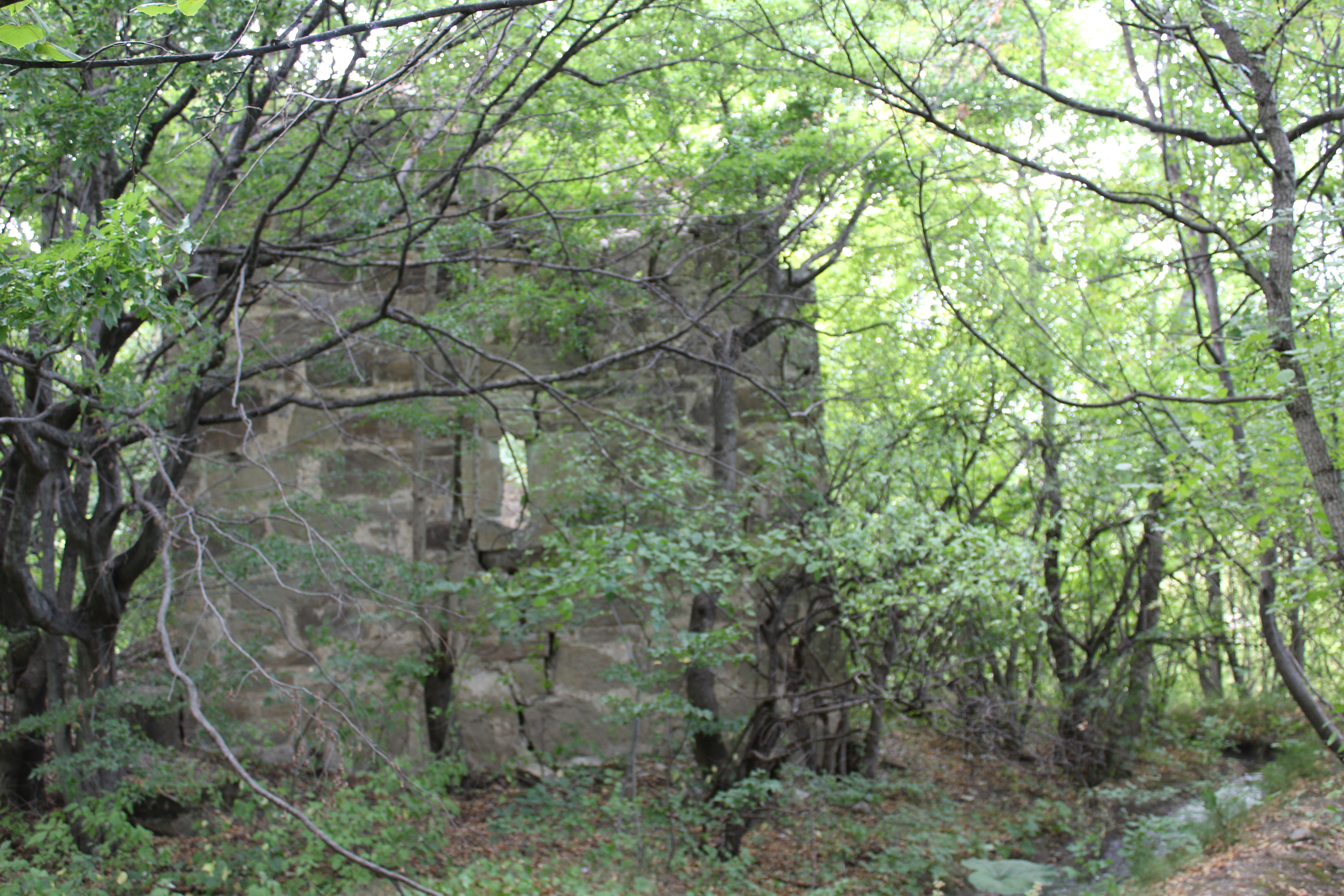
Jvarpatiosani church.

== See also ==
- Maghalashvili
- Kaspi Municipality
- Rkoni Monastery
- Shida Kartli
- Georgia
