= Battle of Botora =

1120 battle of the Georgian-Seljuk Wars

- Part of the Georgian–Seljuk wars
Date	February 14, 1120
Location	Botora, Kingdom of Georgia
Result	Georgian victory

Belligerents
Kingdom of Georgia	Seljuk Empire

Commanders and leaders
David IV	Unknown

The Battle of Botora (Georgian: ბოტორის ბრძოლა) was fought between the armies of the Kingdom of Georgia and the Seljuk Empire on February 14, 1120.

== Background ==
In 1116 David IV suddenly attacked and destroyed the Turks at the Battle of Tao. In 1118 David IV destroyed the Turks encamped on the banks of the Aras at the Battle of Rakhsi.

== Battle ==
King David IV used to go to Abkhazia and the Turks wintered near the banks of the Mtkvari. The Turks had been watching David IV and were following his tracks. David IV went to Geguti and from there to Khupati and thus gave the Turks the confidence to return. Learning that he was away, they camped at Botora. The Turks were many and they set up camps to spend the winter. On February 14, David IV suddenly attacked the Turks and completely destroyed them. Only a few of them managed to get on their horses and flee. In the battle the Georgians captured many Turks and took much booty.

== Aftermath ==
In 1120 David IV destroyed the Turks camps in Arsharunik and Sevgelamej, and in he did the same in Khunan and Barda. In all these episodes, the enemy camp was destroyed, meaning that the Georgia army managed to secretly approach it and perform a surprise attack.

== Sources ==
- Metreveli, Roin (2011). Saint David the Builder. Tbilisi. ISBN 9789941425509.
- Lortkipanidze, Mariam; Japaridze, Otar; Muskhelishvili, David; Metreveli, Roin (2012). History of Georgia in four volumes, vol. II - History of Georgia from the 4th century to the 13th century. Tbilisi: National Academy of Sciences of Georgia. ISBN 978-9941-19-585-3.
- Kaukhchishvili, Simon (1955). La vie du Karthli – Texte complet et commentaires le concernant (in Georgian). Tbilisi: Publication d'État. ISBN 99928-43-44-6.
