= Battle of Rakhsi =

1118 battle of the Georgian–Seljuk Wars

- Part of the Georgian–Seljuk wars
Date	April 1118
Location	Rakhsi (Araxes)
Result	Georgian victory

Belligerents
Kingdom of Georgia	Seljuk Empire

Commanders and leaders
David IV	Unknown

The Battle of Rakhsi or Araxes (Georgian: რახსის ბრძოლა) took place between the Kingdom of Georgia and the Seljuks in the Rakhsi (Araxes) river in 1118.

== Battle ==
In 1118, Beshken II Jaqeli, a Georgian nobleman who ruled Javakheti, was killed by the Seljuks in Javakheti. The Georgian king, David IV, heard in Nakhiduri about the Seljuk invasion of Javakheti and the killing of Beshken Jaqeli. David refused to listen to his nobles’ advice to retreat and managed to avenge Beshken’s death by defeating the Seljuks in Rakhsi (Aras River) and massacring the Seljuk garrisons on the Aras in April 1118.

== Aftermath ==
David IV captured Lori in 1118. Since 1065, the city had been the capital of Kingdom of Tashir-Dzoraget, created by the Kiurikian dynasty. David IV annexed Lori with its surrounding territory to Georgia. In July 1118, David IV captured Agarani in one day. Bagrat IV, David's grandfather, had taken three months to capture Agarani in the previous century.

== See also ==
- List of Georgian battles

== Sources ==
- Metreveli, Roin (2011). Saint David the Builder. Tbilisi. ISBN 9789941425509.
- Lortkipanidze, Mariam; Japaridze, Otar; Muskhelishvili, David; Metreveli, Roin (2012). History of Georgia in four volumes, vol. II - History of Georgia from the 4th century to the 13th century. Tbilisi: National Academy of Sciences of Georgia. ISBN 978-9941-19-585-3.
