= Battle of Ertsukhi =

Battle in 1104

- Part of the Georgian–Seljuk wars
Date	1104
Location	Ertsukhi, Kingdom of Georgia
Result	Georgian victory: Kingdom of Kakheti-Hereti conclusively annexed to the Kingdom of Georgia in 1104

Belligerents
Kingdom of Georgia	Seljuk Empire: Shaddadids

Commanders and leaders
David IV	Manuchihr ibn Shavur

The Battle of Ertsukhi was fought in 1104 between the armies of the Kingdom of Georgia and the Seljuk Empire in southeastern part of Georgia, near Ertsukhi.

== Background ==
Prior to David IV's reign, the Kingdom of Georgia was confronted by several major threats. The country was invaded by the Seljuks, which were part of the same wave which had overrun Anatolia, defeating the Byzantine Empire and taking captive the emperor Romanos IV Diogenes at the battle of Manzikert in 1071. In what the medieval Georgian chronicle refers to as didi turkoba, "the Great Turkish Invasion", several provinces of Georgia became depopulated and King George II was forced to sue for peace, becoming a tributary of Seljuk sultan Malik-Shah I in 1083. The great noble houses of Georgia, capitalizing on the vacillating character of the king, sought to assert more autonomy for themselves; Tbilisi, the ancient capital of Kartli, remained in the hands of the Emirate of Tbilisi, and a local dynasty, for a time suppressed by George's father Bagrat IV, maintained its precarious independence as the Kingdom of Kakheti-Hereti in the eastern region of Kakheti under the Seljuk suzerainty.

King David IV decides to unify the Georgian realm. To accomplish this task, he must succeed in reunifying western Georgia with the rest of the country. Indeed, the Kingdom of Kakheti-Hereti had declared its independence during the reign of George I (r. 1014-1027), thus depriving Georgia of a significant part of its territories. Understanding that only war could help him in his project, the king launched a short attack against King Kvirike IV (r. 1084-1102) and managed to capture the fortress of Zedazeni, north of Mtskheta, in 1101 or 1103.

Kvirike IV died a year later and was succeeded his nephew Aghsartan II, who was said to have been "the complete opposite of his paternal uncle". Converted to Islam, he declared himself a vassal of the Seljuk Empire to avoid a new Georgian attack. However, he cannot foresee the discontent of the nobility of his own country, who are hardly satisfied by the change of religion of their sovereign. In 1104, a plot led by the Heretian Arishiani, Baram and their uncle Kavtar Baramisdze, dethroned Aghsartan II and delivered him to David IV, the latter reincorporated Kingdom of Kakheti-Hereti within his realm, and Aghsartan was imprisoned in Kutaisi.

== Battle ==
The Seljuks, who still considered Kingdom of Kakheti-Hereti as their vassal, were not resigned to defeat against the Georgians. The death of Sultan Malik-Shah I (1092) and the Pope's call for the Crusade against the Turks (1095) had already enabled David IV to call into question Muslim vassalage by ceasing the payment of the annual tribute established in 1080.

The Seljuk Sultan Berkyaruq sent a large army to Georgia to retake Kakheti-Hereti under the command of the Atabeg of Ganja who fought a decisive battle in the southeastern part of the Kingdom, near the Ertsukhi. The Seljuk army was annihilated by Georgian troops, personally led by David IV, whose exploits are recounted in the Georgian Chronicles. His chronicler thus compares the bravery of David IV to the biblical David and reports the ferocity of his blows. Three of his horses died during the battle, but the monarch, installed on his fourth mount, managed to make his sword flow “a mass of thickened and frozen blood”.

== Folklore ==
According to a legendary tradition described in The Georgian Chronicles, when David removed his armor after the battle, blood splashed down from behind his armor plate. This led the by-standers to believe that their king was wounded, when in fact the blood belonged to the enemies that the king had slain in battle.

== Bibliography ==
- "Kartlis Tskhovreba". The Georgian Chronicles Chapter 6 (PDF) (in Georgian). p. 346. Archived from the original (PDF) on 2015-02-04.
- Rapp, Stephan (2000). "Sumbat Davitʿis-dze and the Vocabulary of Political Authority in the Era of Georgian Unification". Journal of the American Oriental Society. 120 (4): 570–576. doi:10.2307/606617. JSTOR 606617.
- Rayfield, Donald (2012). Edge of Empires (Kindle ed.). Reaktion Books. ISBN 978-1780230306.
- Toumanoff, Cyril (1966). "Armenia and Georgia". The Cambridge Medieval History (Volume 4). Cambridge University Press. pp. 593–637.
- Lortkipanidze, Mariam; Japaridze, Otar; Muskhelishvili, David; Metreveli, Roin (2012). History of Georgia in four volumes, vol. II - History of Georgia from the 4th century to the 13th century. Tbilisi: National Academy of Sciences of Georgia. ISBN 978-9941-19-585-3.
- Brosset, Marie-Félicité (1849). Histoire de la Géorgie depuis l'Antiquité jusqu'au XIXe siècle. Volume I [History of Georgia from Ancient Times to the 19th Century, Volume 1] (in French). Saint-Petersburg: Imperial Academy of Sciences.
- Kaukhchishvili, Simon (1955). La vie du Karthli — Texte complet et commentaires le concernant (in Georgian). Tbilisi: Publication d'État. ISBN 99928-43-44-6..
- Salia, Kalistrat (1980). Histoire de la nation géorgienne [History of the Georgian nation] (in French). Paris: Nino Salia.
- Javakhishvili, Ivane (1949). Histoire de la Géorgie. XIe – XVe siècles (in Georgian). Tbilisi: Publication d'État de la RSS de Géorgie..
- Asatiani, Nodar; Janelidze, Otar (2009). History of Georgia. Tbilisi: Publishing House Petite. ISBN 978-9941-9063-6-7.
- Toumanoff, Cyrille (1976). Manuel de Généalogie et de Chronologie pour l'histoire de la Caucasie chrétienne (Arménie, Géorgie, Albanie) [Manual of Genealogy and Chronology of Christian Caucasian History (Armenia, Georgia, Albania)] (in French). Rome: Edizioni Aquila.
- Allen, W.E.D. (1932). A history of the Georgian people; from the beginning down to the Russian conquest in the nineteenth century. London: Routledge & K. Paul. ISBN 0-7100-6959-6.
- Asatiani, Nodar; Bendianashvili, Alexandre (1997). Histoire de la Géorgie. Paris: L'Harmattan. ISBN 2-7384-6186-7.
