= David Nairashvili =

Georgian brigadier general

- Born: October 24, 1964 (age 61)
- Military career
- Allegiance: Soviet Union; Georgia
- Branch: Soviet Air Defence Forces; Georgian Army
- Service years: 1982-2014
- Rank: Brigadier General
- Commands: Georgian Armed Forces

David Nairashvili (Georgian: დავით ნაირაშვილი) (born October 24, 1964) is a Georgian brigadier general (2008) and former Deputy Chief of Joint Staff of the Georgian Armed Forces.

Born in Tbilisi, Nairashvili after completing his conscription with a radar unit in the Soviet Air Defense Forces between 1982 and 1984, graduated from the Soviet Mozhaisky Military Space Engineering Institute in 1986 and served as a MiG-25 pilot until 1989. Since 1992, he has held various positions in the National Guard of Georgia and Ministry of Defense of Georgia, including being Deputy Commander of Georgian Air Force (1993-1994), and Deputy Chief of General Staff (1999-2000, 2004–2005). From 2000 to 2004, he served as Georgia's first representative to the Supreme Headquarters Allied Powers Europe in Belgium.

From March 2007 to September 2008, Nairashvili commanded the Georgian Air Force which saw combat action in the August 2008 war with Russia. In April 2009, he was decorated with Georgia's high state award – St. George's Victory Order – for his conduct during the war.

Military offices
Preceded by Alan Lakoyev	Commander of the Georgian Air Force; 2007 – 2008	Succeeded by Zurab Pochkhua
