= Order of David the Builder =

Order of David IV the Builder დავით აღმაშენებლის ორდენი
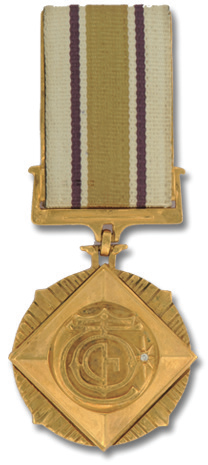
- Order of David IV The Builder

Awarded by Georgia
- Type: Single grade order
- Established: December 24, 1992

Precedence
- Next (higher): St. George's Order of Victory
- Next (lower): Order of Queen Tamara
- Ribbon bar

The Order of David the Builder (Georgian: დავით აღმაშენებლის ორდენი, romanized: davit aghmasheneblis ordeni) is an honor awarded by the President of Georgia. Established in 1992, until 2004, before the introduction of the Order of the National Hero and St. George's Order of Victory, it was the country's highest state award. It is given to regular citizens, military and clerical personnel for outstanding contributions to the country, for fighting for the independence of Georgia and its revival, and for significantly contributing to social consolidation and the development of democracy.

== Insignia ==
The Order of Davit Agmashenebeli has a 40-millimeter round silhouette with a rhombus carved on it. In the circular recess of the rhombus, the Asomtavruli letter "Ⴀ" [A] is depicted surrounded by the Asomtavruli letters "Ⴃ"[D] and "Ⴇ " [T] (denoting David IV of Georgia), and a royal crown stands on top of them. An eight-pointed diamond-shaped star is placed on the horizontal axis of the order. The order is attached to a clasp made of gold plate with a movable stem. In the center of the 27-millimeter-wide white ribbon on the clasp, a 9-millimeter-wide golden stripe is displayed to mark the golden age of Davit Agmashenebeli's reign. 1.5 mm from the gold stripe on both sides, 2 mm wide violet stripes are displayed.

The author of the Order is a graphic artist, artist-monumentalist Emir Burjanadze.

=== Mistakes in design ===
The use of the rhombus in the Order is officially explained by the fact that "the rhombus is a great sign of God the Father in Georgian symbolism and church painting".

According to Mamuka Gongadze and Mamuka Tsurtsumia, "it is unclear what the "great sign of God the Father" has in common with David Agmashenebeli; However, the rhombus carries a completely different load in heraldry."

According to Gongadze and Tsurtsumia, "it is also a mistake to choose a circular, round shape for the order. In phalerestics, awards of the highest degree (i.e. orders) traditionally have the shape of a cross or a star (in Muslim countries also a crescent); And the round shape is mostly accepted for medals (i.e., for the lower level awards). Almost no high-ranking order in Europe has a round shape. The order of this form is artificially distorted and it seems to represent a central medallion torn from traditional orders." Also, according to them, it is a mistake that enamel is not used in the order and that it is made entirely of metal.

== Recipients ==
- Ilia II - Catholicos-Patriarch of All Georgia and the spiritual leader of the Georgian Orthodox Church
- Giorgi Ugulava – Georgian politician; 2013.
- Levan Varshalomidze – Georgian politician; 2013.

== See also ==
- Orders, decorations, and medals of Georgia
