= Zurab Pochkhua =

Georgian colonel (born 1963)

- Military career
- Allegiance: Georgia
- Branch: Georgian Air Force
- Rank: Colonel
- Commands: Georgian Armed Forces
- Conflicts: awardslaterwork=

Zurab Pochkhua (Georgian: ზურაბ ფოჩხუა) (born July 11, 1963) is a Georgian colonel. He was the commander of Georgian Air Force from September 15, 2008 to 2010.

In 1998 Pochkhua finished short courses of air defense at Zhukov Command Academy of Air Defense in Tver, Russia.

Pochkhua served as Commander of Communication Company of the First Anti-aircraft Rocket Brigade from 1993 to 1995. Then as a Chief of Staff of the First Air Defense Base from 1995 to 2002 and as a Commander of Command Control Center (C3) of the Georgian Air Force from 2002 to 2005.

From 2005 and during 2008 war with Russia Pochkhua was a Deputy Commander of Georgian Air Force and Chief of the Air Defense of Air Forces. He was commander of the Air Force from 2008 to 2010. He then served as a defense attaché to Ukraine.

Zurab Pochkhua has been awarded with Medal for Military Courage (2000) and St. George's Victory Order (2008).

Military offices
Preceded by David Nairashvili	Commander of the Georgian Air Force; 2008 – 2010	Succeeded by Gocha Shingazrdilov
