= St. George's Order of Victory =

Order of Georgia

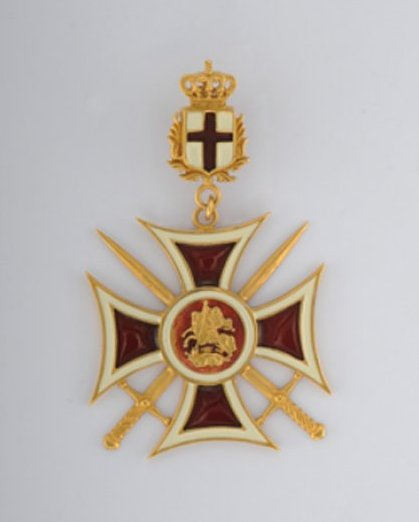
- St. George's Order of Victory

Awarded by Georgia
- Type: Single grade order
- Established: 24 June 2004

Precedence
- Next (higher): Order of the National Hero
- Next (lower): Order of David IV The Builder
- Ribbon bar

The Saint George's Order of Victory (Georgian: წმინდა გიორგის სახელობის გამარჯვების ორდენი, romanized: ts'minda giorgis sakhelobis gamarjvebis ordeni) is an honor awarded by the government of Georgia, which comes second in rank to the Order of National Hero. It was established in 2004.

== Statute ==
Saint George's Order of Victory was established on 24 June 2004. It is conferred on Georgian and foreign nationals for an "exceptional role played in victories for Georgia". The award carries the monetary grant of 6,000 Georgian lari.

== Notable recipients ==
- George W. Bush – United States politician, President of the United States; 2005.
- John McCain – United States politician; 2007.
- Zurab Noghaideli – Georgian politician, Prime Minister of Georgia; 2007.
- Valdas Adamkus – Lithuanian politician, President of Lithuania; 2007.
- Lech Kaczyński – Polish politician, President of Poland; 2007.
- Vakhtang Kikabidze – Georgian singer and film actor; 2008.
- Vytautas Landsbergis – Lithuanian politician and member of the European Parliament; 2009.
- Eldar Shengelaia – Georgian film director and politician; 2009.
- Devi Chankotadze – Georgian major general; 2009.
- David Nairashvili – Georgian brigadier general; 2009.
- Petras Vaitiekūnas – Lithuanian politician, Foreign Minister of Lithuania; 2009.
- Joe Biden – United States politician, Vice President of the United States; 2009.
- John F. Tefft – United States diplomat, Ambassador to Georgia; 2009.
- Viktor Yushchenko – Ukrainian politician, President of Ukraine; 2009.
- Valdis Zatlers – Latvian politician, President of Latvia; 2009.
- Toomas Hendrik Ilves – Estonian politician, President of Estonia; 2010.
- Mart Laar – Estonian politician; 2010.
- Richard Holbrooke – U.S. diplomat; posthumously, 2010.
- Joe Lieberman – U.S. senator; 2010.
- Henri de Raincourt – French politician, Minister in charge of Co-operation; 2011.
- Alexander Lomaia – Georgian politician, envoy to the United Nations; 2011.
- Nicolas Sarkozy – French politician, President of France; 2011.
- Václav Havel – Czech writer and statesman; 2011.
- Krzysztof Lisek – Polish politician, member of the European Parliament; 2011.
- Vano Merabishvili – Georgian politician, Minister of Internal Affairs; 2012.
- Alexander Khetaguri - Georgian politician, Minister of Energy; 2012.
- Ramaz Nikolaishvili – Georgian politician, Minister of Infrastructure; 2012.
- Bill Clinton – American politician, President of the United States; 2013.
- Abdullah Gül – Turkish politician, 11th President of Republic of Turkey; 2013
- Andrey Illarionov – Russian economist and statesman; 2013.
- David Sergeenko – Minister of Healthcare of Georgia; 2015.
- Khvicha Kvaratskhelia – Georgian association football player; 2025.

== See also ==
- Orders, decorations, and medals of Georgia
- Order of Queen Tamara (disambiguation)
