= Mtsignobartukhutsesi =

Chancery office in medieval Georgia

The mtsignobartukhutsesi (Georgian: მწიგნობართუხუცესი), or chancellor, was the official responsible for the royal chancery in medieval Georgia, supervising the scribes who prepared the king's documents. In the early 12th century, David IV combined the chancellorship with the bishopric of Chkondidi, giving the holder of the combined office of mtsignobartukhutsesi-chkondideli precedence over the other officials of the royal court.

== History ==
The chancellorship existed by the 11th century, when its scribes prepared royal decrees and documents concerning relations between the crown, the church, and royal officials. Their work included recording decisions of the king's court, with one copy of each document retained in the royal archive and another given to its recipient.

Following David IV's reform, the mtsignobartukhutsesi-chkondideli advised the king and supervised ecclesiastical, civil, and military administration. His duties extended to presiding over the royal court of justice, the saajo kari, and overseeing churches and monasteries on royal estates, although Gelati retained a degree of autonomy. The first holder of the combined office, Giorgi, bishop of Chkondidi, also exercised military command, capturing Samshvilde in 1110 and Rustavi in 1115.

The combined office retained its privileges until late in Tamar's reign, when her appointment of Ivane Mkhargrdzeli as atabagi began to restrict its authority. The atabagi shared the status of "father of the king" previously held by the mtsignobartukhutsesi-chkondideli, whose influence at court consequently diminished.

In Kakheti, Lazare is recorded in 1537 as both mtsignobartukhutsesi and mestumre, an official responsible for receiving guests and envoys.

== Modern usage ==
On its official website, the Royal House of Georgia, headed by Davit Bagrationi, uses "Chief Administrator" as the English designation for its mtsignobartukhutsesi.

== See also ==
- Court officials of the Kingdom of Georgia
