= Beshken II Jaqeli =

Georgian nobleman (died 1118)

Beshken II Jaqeli (Georgian: ბეშქენ II ჯაყელი; died 1118) was a prominent feudal nobleman of southern Georgia in the late 11th and early 12th centuries. He was a landowner of Jaqi (fortress in Samtskhe), an official under King David IV the Builder (r. 1089–1125), and governor of Javakheti. Beshken II was probably the grandson of Beshken I Jaqeli, the eristavi of Tukhарisi, and the son of Murvan Jaqeli, the eristavi of Queli. He was killed in battle against the Turks during their invasion of Javakheti.
