= Arishiani =

Arishiani (Georgian: არიშიანი) was a 12th-century Georgian noble (didebuli) of Hereti. Arishian along with other nobles, such as Baram and Kavtar, captured King Aghsartan II of Kakheti and delivered him to the King David IV of Georgia, the latter reincorporated kingdom of Kakheti and Hereti within his realm. For this he was granted duchy of Hereti.
