= Agarani Fortress =

- აგარანის ციხე
- Near Kojori in Georgia
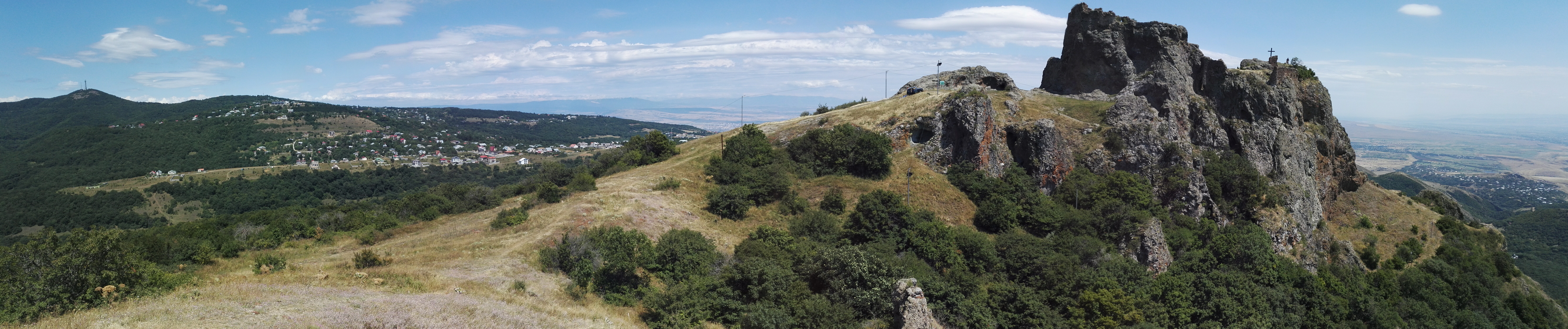
- The fortress ruins with Kojori settlement on the left

Site information
- Type: Fortress
- Open to the public: Open
- Condition: Ruined

Location
- Location within Georgia
- Coordinates: 41.641°N 44.691°E

Site history
- Materials: Stones and Brick

Airfield information
- Elevation: 1,241 metres (4,072 ft) AMSL

Cultural Heritage Monument of Georgia
- Official name: Kojori Fortress
- Designated: March 26, 2006; 20 years ago
- Reference no.: 1561
- Item Number in Cultural Heritage Portal: 6855
- Date of entry in the registry: October 3, 2007; 18 years ago

Agarani (Georgian: აგარანი), also known as Kojori Fortress or Azeula Fortress or Kor Ogli Fortress, is a Georgian feudal fortress located near Tbilisi, Kojori in Kvemo Kartli region. In historical sources it is often referred to as "Agarata Fortress", which defended the main road to Tbilisi from the south, on the way of important caravan route.

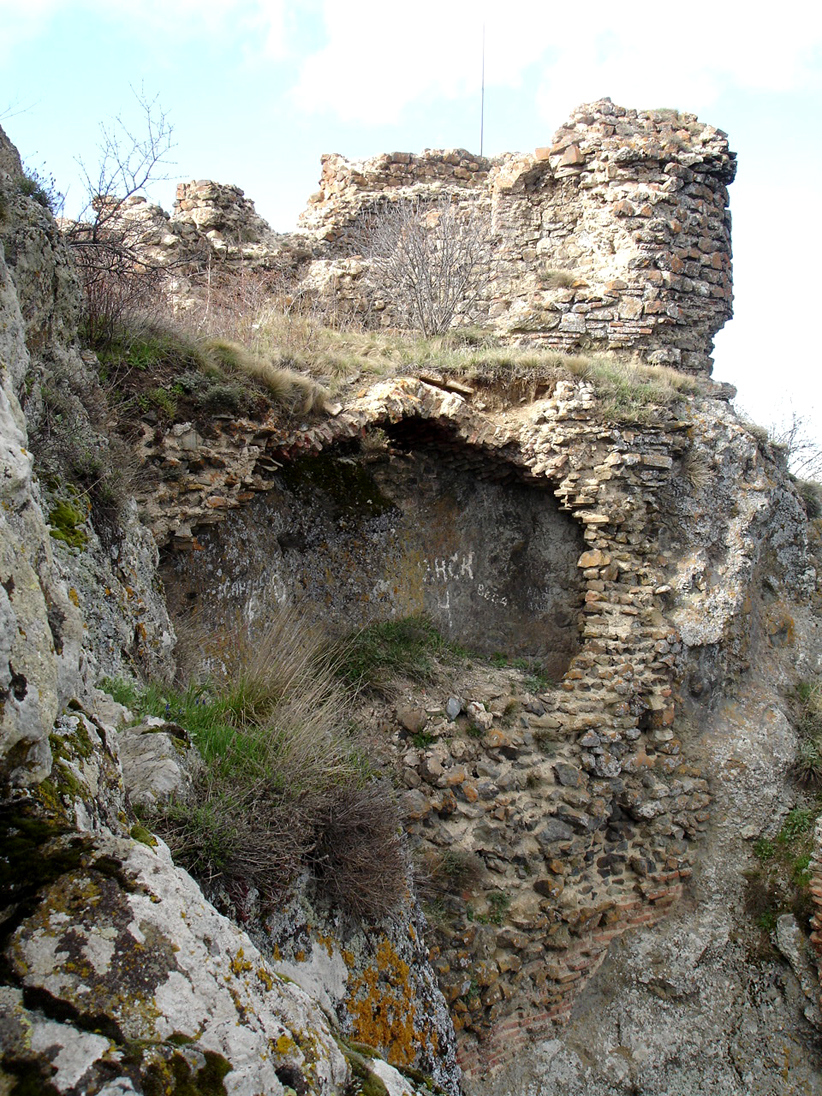
Ruins of the Agarani fortress

== Geography ==
The fortress was built at the top of Azeula Mountain (1351 m a.s.l.) on Didi Kedi Range of volcanic origin, a part of Trialeti mountains.

== History ==
The fortress was mentioned in The Georgian Chronicles, but the time of its construction is unknown. In the 1060s King Bagrat IV took it over from emir Fadlon. During the "Great Turkish Invasion" (1080) the fortress was captured by the enemy, and that is when it received the name "Kor Ogli". This name was still used on Soviet topographic maps. In July 1118, David the Builder besieged Agarani in one day, and in 1123 gave it to Ivane Orbeli. The Orbelis later rebelled against the King Georgy III, and lost their possession. "Agarani Fortress" was a summer residence of Georgian kings. According to the chronicles, Queen Tamar was brought ill to Agarani and here she died, but her burial place is unknown. From the 15th century the fortress belonged to Sologashvili family, when it was called "Kojori Fortress". According to Vakhushti Batonishvili, it was previously known as the "Azulula Fortress". In February 1921, the Georgian cadets of Officer School died in a battle against the Red Army, which happened by the fortress.

== Bibliography ==
- D. Berdzenishvili, Georgian Soviet Encyclopedia, I, p. 52, Tbilisi, 1975.
