= Palace of Geguti =

Royal Palace of Geguti
- გეგუთის სასახლე (Georgian)
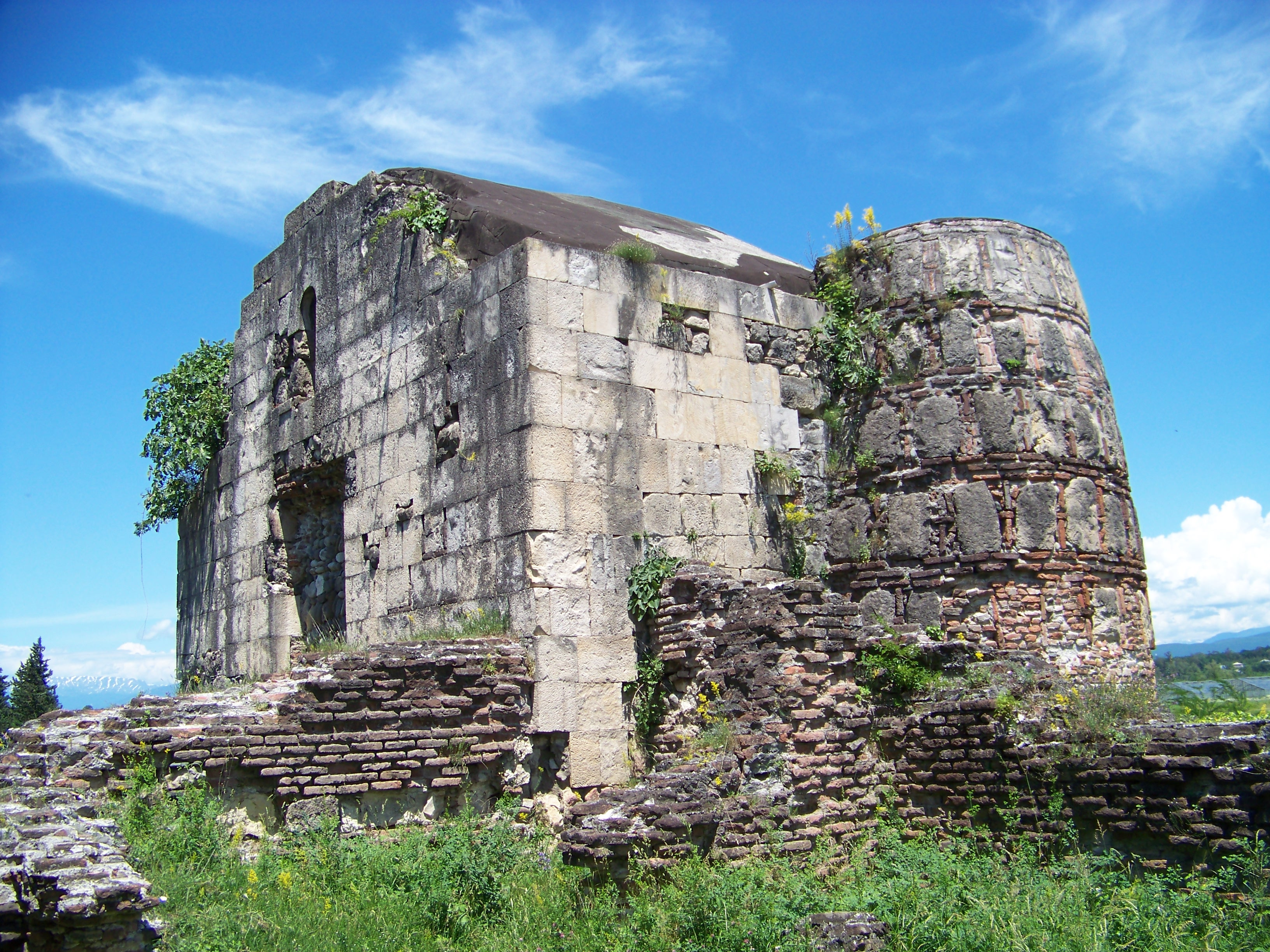
- Remnants of a tower

- Location within Imereti Location within Georgia
- 42°11′25.1″N 42°41′28.3″E
- Type: ruins
- Location: (Georgia (country)) Geguti, Imereti, Georgia

Immovable Cultural Monument of National Significance of Georgia
- Official name: Geguti Palace Complex
- Designated: November 7, 2006; 19 years ago
- Reference no.: 614
- Item Number in Cultural Heritage Portal: 8381; 9367; 9360;
- Date of entry in the registry: October 3, 2007; 18 years ago

The Royal Palace of Geguti (Georgian: გეგუთის სასახლე) was a Georgian royal palace active during the Middle Ages. Currently only ruins remain at the eponymous village, 7 km south of the city of Kutaisi.

== History ==
Ruins of the royal palace of Geguti

The ruins of the Geguti palace complex occupy the area of over 2,000 m^{2} along the Rioni River. An extensive fieldwork between 1953 and 1956 allowed the specialists to stratify the principal archaeological layers and reconstruct the architectural form and decoration of the medieval edifices bulk of which dates to the 12th century, the period when the first written mention of Geguti appears in the Georgian Chronicle. The earliest structure – a plain, one-room building with a large fireplace – dates back to the 8th/9th century. A principal part of the royal complex, commissioned by King George III of Georgia (r. 1156–1184), is a four-tier brick edifice built onto a three-metre high stone plinth, with its spacious, cruciform central hall surmounted by a dome 14 m in diameter resting on squinches. The entire building is walled and fortified with massive pillars. Westerly located additional structures and a palace church are of a later period, dating to the 13th/14th century.

The importance of the ruins of the Geguti palace is emphasized by its largely secular nature as most of the surviving monuments of medieval Georgian architecture are churches and monasteries. Records of medieval secular patronage (basically palaces with extensive decorative cycles) exist in the Georgian written sources, although only the shells of castles and the ruins of Geguti survive to testify the extent of the work produced.

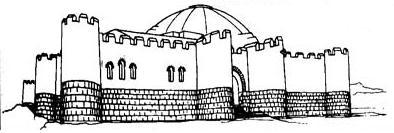
Reconstruction sketch by V. Tsintsadze

The main complex of the Geguti royal palace was constructed during what is considered to be medieval Georgian Golden Age. Although the Georgian court was quite mobile, the establishment of a royal palace of this scale near the kingdom’s second capital and a major cultural center can be understood as the desire to establish a more settled, regal court, and royal bureaucracy which, indeed, reached its climax under the queen regnant Tamar (r. 1184-1213).

The Geguti palace frequently features in the Georgian annals as a beloved place of rest of the Georgian royalty. In the reign of Tamar, it was the place where her former husband, Prince Yuri Bogolyubsky, was crowned by the rebellious nobles during an abortive coup against the queen in 1191.

In 2016, a glass panel installation was erected, surrounding the ruins, to show visitors the complete original shape of the monument.

== See also ==
- Batoni Castle
