= Sanebeli =

Village in Shida Kartli, Georgia

Sanebeli სანებელი
- Village
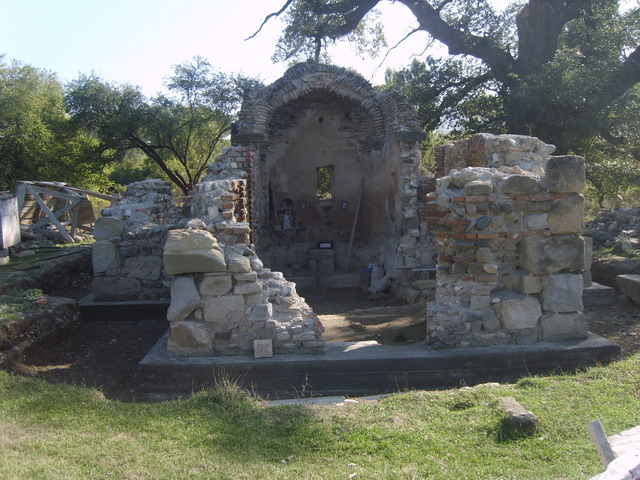
- St. Nicholas Church of Sanebeli

- Location within Georgia
- Coordinates: 41°59′32″N 43°50′00″E
- Country: Georgia
- Region: Shida Kartli
- Municipality: Kareli
- Community: Kekhijvari
- Elevation: 670 m (2,200 ft)

Population (2014)
  - Total: 201
- Time zone: +4
- Area code: +995

Sanebeli (Georgian: სანებელი) is a village in Georgia, in the Kareli Municipality of Shida Kartli, within the Kekhijvari community (temi). It is situated in the valley of the Dzama River, on the northern foothills of the Trialeti Range. The village lies at an elevation of 670 metres above sea level, and is located 5 kilometres from Kareli.

== Demographics ==
According to the 2014 census, the village has a population of 201.

Census year	Population	Male	Female
2002	233	106	127
2014	▼201	104	97
