= Sagholasheni =

Sagholasheni საღოლაშენი
- Village
- Interactive map of Sagholasheni
- Coordinates: 42°03′48″N 43°53′14″E
- Country: Georgia
- Region: Shida Kartli
- Municipality: Kareli Municipality
- Community: Breti
- Elevation: 650 m (2,130 ft)

Population (2014)
  - Total: 452
- Time zone: UTC+4

Sagholasheni (Georgian: საღოლაშენი) is a village in the Kareli Municipality of Shida Kartli, Georgia. It is part of the Breti community. The village lies on the Shida Kartli plain, on the left bank of the East Prone River, at an elevation of 650 metres above sea level and 6 kilometres from Kareli. The Sagholasheni Church of the Dormition of the Mother of God is located in the village. Sagholasheni was mentioned in the description of Prince Ioane of Georgia from 1794–1799.

== History ==
In Georgian historical sources, the village first appears in the 15th century Genealogy of the Amirejibi family. At the beginning of the 15th century, the Georgian statesman and politician Kutsna Amirejibi purchased Sagholasheni for his son Ramin. In the second half of the 15th century, the Amirejibis donated the village to the Ulumbe Church of the Mother of God, but during the 16th–18th centuries the Amirejibi family retained possession of it. In the second half of the 18th century, the Taktakishvili family also acquired shares in the village estate. From late feudal documents it appears that Sagholasheni was economically strong, with a large number of water mills.

== Demographics ==
Families in the village include the Shubitidze, Somkhishvili, Nakhutsrishvili, Javakhishvili, Dzmorashvili, Kharazishvili and Sukhitashvili clans.

According to the 2014 census, the population of Sagholasheni was 452.

Census year	Population	Male	Female
2002	508	239	269
2014	452	234	218

== Literature ==
- Georgian Soviet Encyclopedia, Vol. 9, p. 201, Tbilisi, 1985.
- History of Georgia, Vol. 5, p. 393, K. Kakhaadze.
