= Saterdze =

Satardze
- Village
- Location within Georgia
- Coordinates: 41°55′10″N 43°41′19″E
- Country: Georgia
- Region: Shida Kartli
- Municipality: Kareli
- Community: Zguderi
- Elevation: 1,120 m (3,670 ft)

Population (2014)
  - Total: 6
- Time zone: +4
- Area code: +995

Satardze (Georgian: სათერძე) is a village in Georgia, located in the Kareli Municipality of Shida Kartli, within the Zguderi community. It is situated on the northern slope of the Trialeti Range, in the valley of the Dzama River, at an elevation of 1120 metres above sea level.

== Demographics ==
According to the 2014 census, the village has a population of 6.

Census year	Population	Male	Female
2014	6	5	1
