= Satsikhuri (Kareli Municipality) =

Satsikhuri საციხური
- Village
- Interactive map of Satsikhuri
- Coordinates: 42°07′00″N 43°44′00″E
- Country: Georgia
- Region: Shida Kartli
- Municipality: Kareli Municipality
- Community: Bredza
- Elevation: 740 m (2,430 ft)

Population (2014)
  - Total: 313
- Time zone: UTC+4

Satsikhuri (Georgian: საციხური) is a village in the Kareli Municipality of Shida Kartli, Georgia. It is part of the Bredza community. The village is located on the Shida Kartli plain, on the right bank of the Lopanistskali River, at an elevation of 740 metres above sea level and 26 kilometres from Kareli. Satsikhuri has a public school.

== Demographics ==
According to the 2014 census, the village has a population of 313. The vast majority of residents are Georgians, who make up 99.7% of the population.

Census year	Population	Male	Female
2002	431	200	231
2014	313	150	163

== Literature ==
- Georgian Soviet Encyclopedia, Vol. 9, p. 214, Tbilisi, 1985.
