= Okrosopeli =

Okrosopeli ოქროსოფელი
- Village
- Location within Georgia
- Coordinates: 41°58′55″N 43°46′20″E
- Country: Georgia
- Region: Shida Kartli
- Municipality: Kareli
- Community: Akhalsopeli
- Elevation: 840 m (2,760 ft)

Population (2014)
  - Total: 10
- Time zone: +4
- Area code: +995

Okrosopeli (Georgian: ოქროსოფელი) is a village in Georgia, located in the Kareli Municipality of Shida Kartli, within the Akhalsopeli community. It lies on the northern slope of the Trialeti Range, at an elevation of 840 metres above sea level, and is situated 16 kilometres from Kareli.

== Demographics ==
According to the 2014 census, the village has a population of 10.

Census year	Population	Male	Female
2002	31	15	16
2014	▼10	6	4
