= Tseronisi =

Village in Georgia (country)

Tseronisi ცერონისი
- Location within Georgia Location within Shida Kartli
- Municipality: Kareli
- Elevation: 700 m (2,300 ft)

Population (2014)
  - Total: 340
- Time zone: UTC+4 (Georgian Time)

Tseronisi (Georgian: ცერონისი) is a village in Georgia, located in the Kareli Municipality of the Shida Kartli region, within the Avlevi community. It is situated on the Shida Kartli plain, on the right bank of the Middle Prone River, at an elevation of 700 meters above sea level. It is located 18 kilometers from Kareli.

== Demographics ==
According to the 2014 census, the population of the village was 340, with 175 men and 165 women. The population was 585 in the 2002 census.

Census year	Population	Male	Female
2002	585	309	276
2014	340	175	165

The village is almost entirely populated by ethnic Georgians (99.1%), with the majority adhering to Christianity.
