= Shindara =

Settlement in Georgia

Shindara შინდარა
- Location within Georgia Location within Shida Kartli
- Coordinates: 42°11′38″N 43°44′56″E
- Municipality: Kareli

Shindara (Georgian: შინდარა) is a village in Kareli District, and the Shida Kartli region at the center of Georgia. The village is 97 kilometers northwest from the Georgian capital Tbilisi, and 24 kilometers northeast from the town of Surami. Shindara is at the northwestern edge of the Trialeti Range of the Lesser Caucasus mountains where they meet the river plain of the Shida Kartli lowlands.

== See also ==
- Shida Kartli
