= Kintsvisi, Georgia =

Kintsvisi ყინწვისი
- Location in Georgia
- Coordinates: 41°58′25″N 43°49′09″E
- Country: Georgia
- Region: Shida Kartli
- Municipality: Kareli
- Elevation: 730 m (2,400 ft)

Population (2014)
  - Total: 205
- Time zone: UTC+4 (Georgian Time)

Kintsvisi (Georgian: ყინწვისი [χʼin̪t͡sʼvis̪i]) is a village in Shida Kartli region of the Republic of Georgia, 7.5 km to the southwest from the town of Kareli. A 13th century Kintsvisi Monastery is situated 1.5 km to the southeast.
