= Mdzovreti fortress =

Medieval fortress in Orubani, Georgia

- მძოვრეთის ციხე
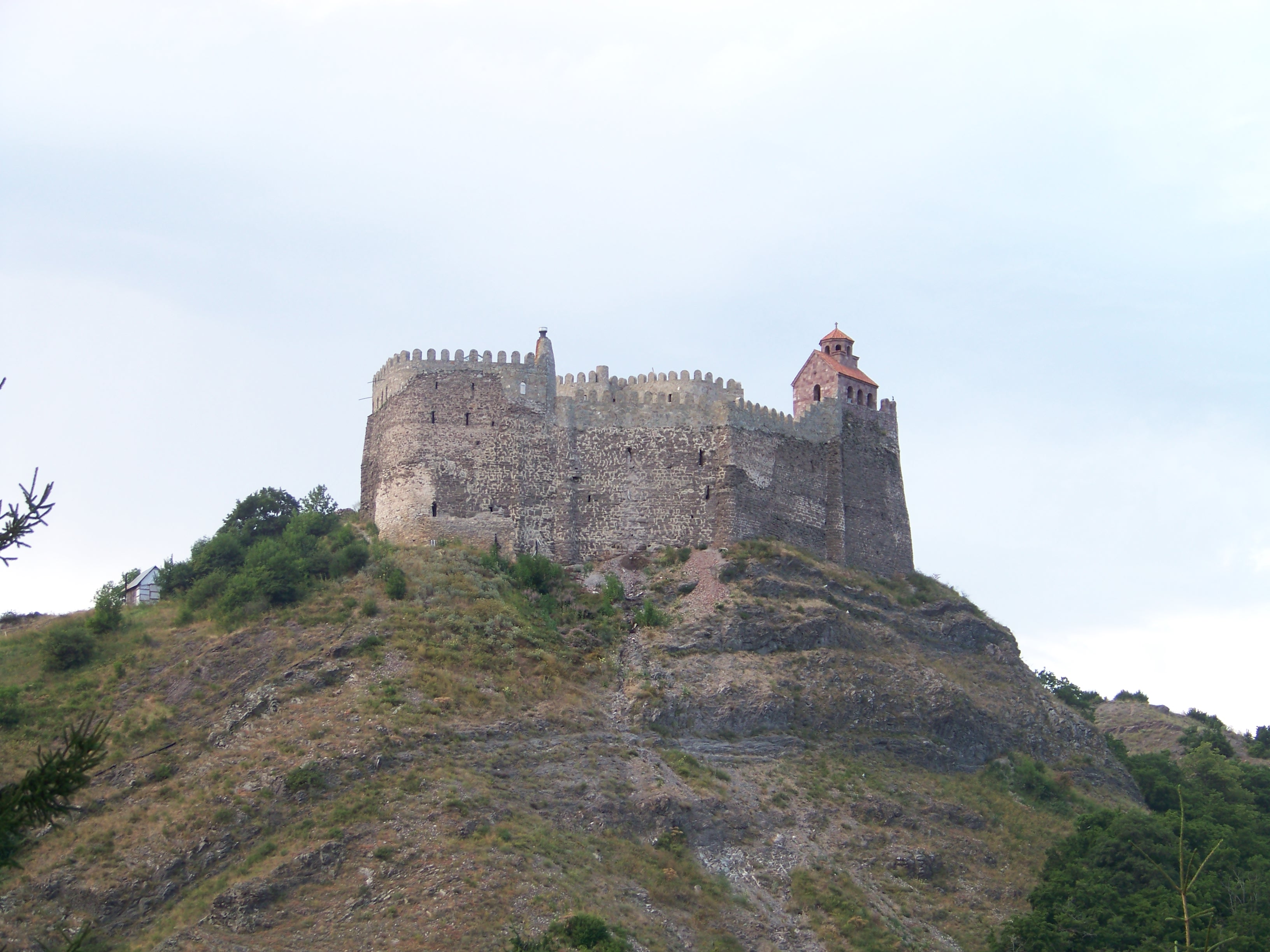
- Mdzovreti fortress
- Location: Kareli Municipality, Shida Kartli, Georgia
- Coordinates: 41°57′07″N 43°44′39″E
- Type: Cyclopean fortress

Mdzovreti fortress (Georgian: მძოვრეთის ციხე) is a fortress in Georgia, Shida Kartli, in the valley of the river Dzama, in the village Ortubani, Kareli Municipality. The fortress is situated on the right bank of the river Dzama. The complex includes: a church, a bell-tower, a castle and several houses and agricultural places.

== History ==
There was a historical city Mdzovreti. In X century here found a shelter a future King of Abkhazia Theodosius III, in 13th century the fortress belonged to the Duke of Dukes Gamrekeli son of Kakha (Toreli). In 1640 this fortress was a stronghold of Prince Nodar Tsitsishvili during his rebellion against the King of Kartli. King Rostom failed to take the fortress. It is a complicated monumental construction erected on the rock with three constructing layers found in the fortress. From the XIV century begins the governance of the noble family of Panaskerteli-Tsitsishvili in the valley of Dzama. In the eastern part of the fortress there is a church of Virgin Mary.
