= Urbnisi =

Urbnisi ურბნისი
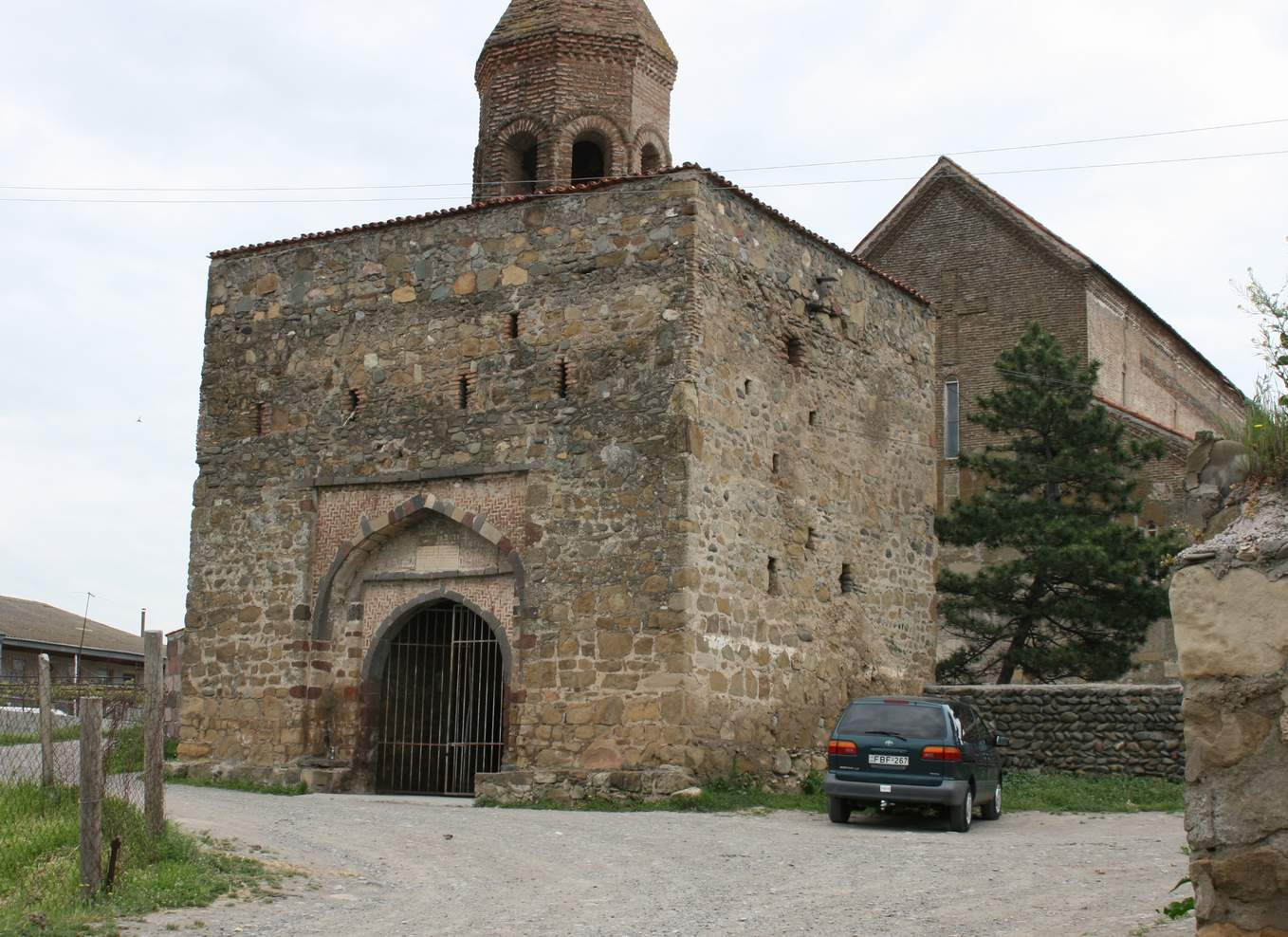
- Urbnisi monastery

- Location in Georgia Urbnisi (Shida Kartli)
- Coordinates: 42°00′45″N 43°58′51″E
- Country: Georgia
- Region: Shida Kartli
- Municipality: Kareli
- Elevation: 640 m (2,100 ft)

Population (2014)
  - Total: 1,109
- Time zone: UTC+4 (Georgian Time)

Urbnisi (Georgian: ურბნისი [uɾbn̪is̪i]) is a village in Georgia’s Shida Kartli region, in the district of Kareli.

Situated on a high left bank of the Mtkvari river, it was an important city in ancient and early medieval Iberia as Georgia was known to the Greeks and Romans. It was the second most important city in the Iberian Kingdom after the capital Mtskheta.

Archaeological studies have demonstrated that the place was inhabited in the 3rd millennium BC. A type of wattle and daub buildings, covered in clay outside and inside, were discovered in the area, which had rounded shape or square with rounded corners, and had a window in the roof. The whole structure was held by central pillar. The settlement grew larger and, in the 4th century BC became a city with thriving commerce and culture. In graves were found locally produced and imported golden, silver, ceramic, class and bone artifacts of artistic value.

The city borders are hard to define, but it was clearly surrounded by a wide stone wall. Ruins of a fortress, rich baths, pagan sanctuaries and even a Jewish temple suggest the importance of the city. Burned structures and round catapult stones indicate the city may have been under a siege and subsequently sacked in c. 3rd century BC.

The new era in Urbnisi’s life began with the conversion of Iberia to Christianity. It now became a major center of Georgian Orthodox culture, and a seat of the bishop. From the 6th to 7th centuries, a strong system of fortifications, containing 25 towers, was erected around the city that did not prevent, however, the Arab commander Marwan (caliph from 744 to 750) from capturing the city in the 730s. Following the invasion, it declined to a small village. However, the Urbnisi cathedral of St. Stephen continued to function as a center of a Georgian Orthodox diocese.

The cathedral is a 6th-7th-century three-nave basilica which was rebuilt twice in the 10th and 17th centuries. Quite a simple and large church, it is based on twelve strong pillars for three naves. There are many inscriptions on the walls of the cathedral as well, which are thought to be examples of the 5th–6th-century Georgian alphabet. In 1706, a bell-tower was erected to the west from the church. An inscription of the western facade says that it was built by the order of the King Vakhtang VI and Queen Rusudan. The bell-tower is composed of two parts: the lower massive cubic base and the belfry with arches. The lower part has two floors. Its ground floor contains the arch entrance to the church territory. The upper floor had living rooms. The eastern facade of the bell-tower has an open balcony.

Near the village is an 8th–9th-century domed church, Ruisi cathedral, which serves as a center of the Urbnisi-Ruisi eparchy of the Georgian Orthodox Church.

Both Urbnisi Monastery and the Ruisi Cathedral are known for a major ecclesiastic council convened here in 1103–1104 by the Georgian king David IV the Builder to cope with problems within the church hierarchy.

== See also ==
- Shida Kartli
