= Urbnisi Cathedral =

Cathedral in Urbnisi, Georgia

Urbnisi cathedral
- ურბნისის ტაძარი
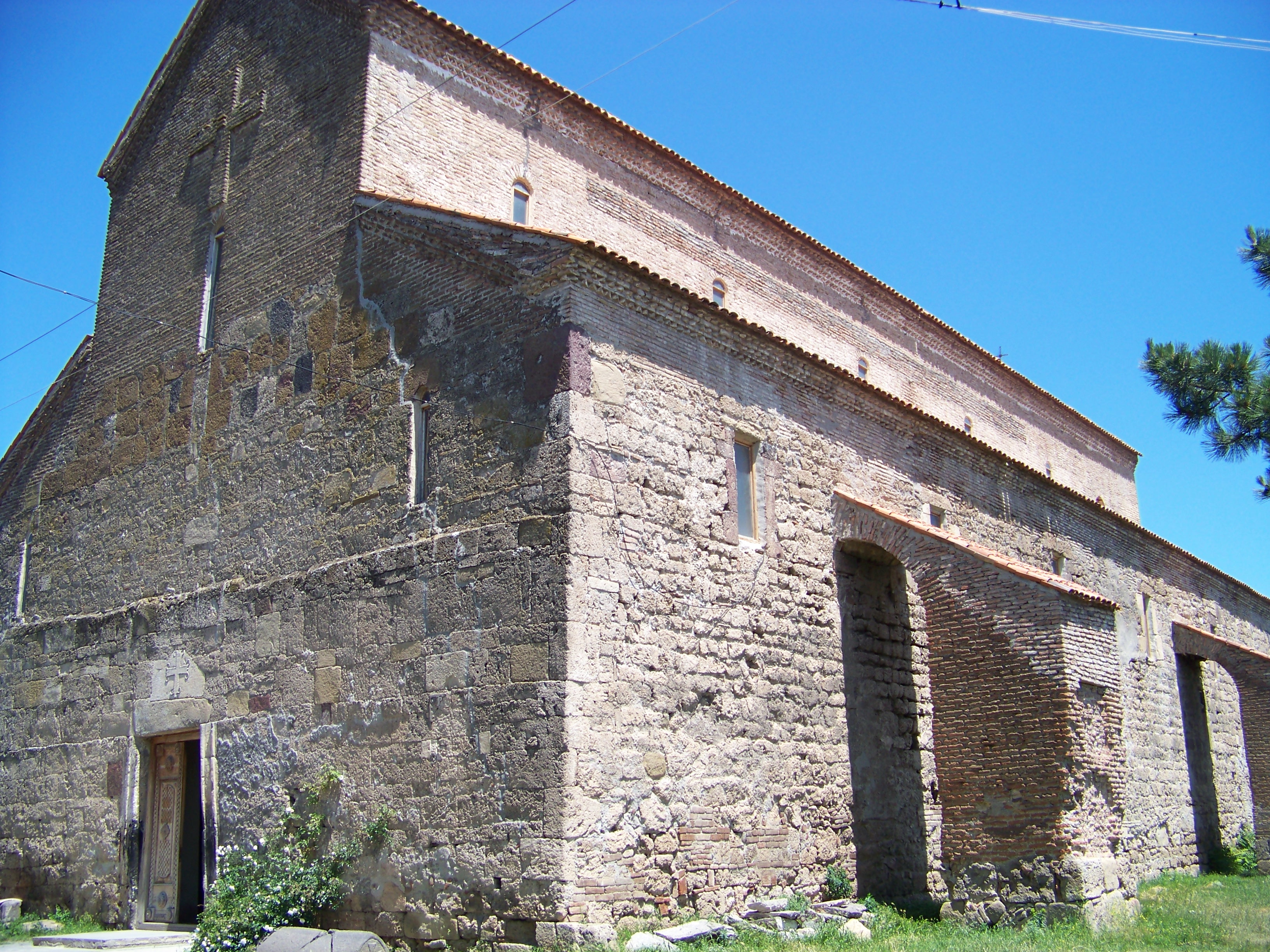
- Urbnisi cathedral. West façade.
- Interactive map of Urbnisi cathedral
- Location: Urbnisi, Kareli Municipality; Shida Kartli, Georgia
- Coordinates: 42.010869°N 43.979801°E
- Type: Three-nave basilica

The Urbnisi cathedral of Saint Stephen the Protomartyr (Georgian: ურბნისის წმიდა სტეფანე პირველმოწამის სახელობის საკათედრო ტაძარი, romanized: urbnisis ts'mida st'epane p'irvelmots'amis sakhelobis sak'atedro t'adzari), commonly known as the Sioni church of Urbnisi (ურბნისის სიონი, urbnisis sioni), is a Georgian Orthodox cathedral at the village of Urbnisi in Georgia's east-central Shida Kartli region. The church is a relatively large three-nave basilica, originally built in the 6th century and reconstructed in the 10th and 17th centuries. The church walls bear several inscriptions, some being among the oldest executed in the Georgian alphabet. The cathedral is inscribed on the list of Georgia's Immovable Cultural Monuments of National Significance.

== History ==
The Urbnisi cathedral stands on the left bank of the Kura river in the eponymous village in the Kareli Municipality, Shida Kartli region, in the eastern part of the old settlement of Urbnisi where archaeological studies uncovered material from the Chalcolithic and the early Bronze Age to the 8th century AD.

The Urbnisi church is dedicated to Saint Stephen, a protomartyr of the 1st century. Following a medieval Georgian tradition of naming churches after particular places in the Holy Land, the cathedral also bears the name of Mount Zion at Jerusalem. A carved inscription in the north façade, in the early Georgian asomtavruli script, makes mention of the builders of the church—Konstanti and Father Mikel—but the text is undated: stylistic analysis of the architectural layout and paleographical features of the inscription suggests a date in the 5th or 6th century.

The Urbnisi cathedral was the seat of a Georgian Orthodox bishop bearing the title of Urbneli and known since at least the 8th century. In 1103, Urbnisi was one of the two locations of the landmark church council convened by King David IV of Georgia, the other being the nearby Ruisi cathedral. Currently, Urbnisi and Ruisi are the two principal cathedrals in the Eparchy of Urbnisi and Ruisi of the Georgian Orthodox Church.

== Layout ==
=== Main church ===
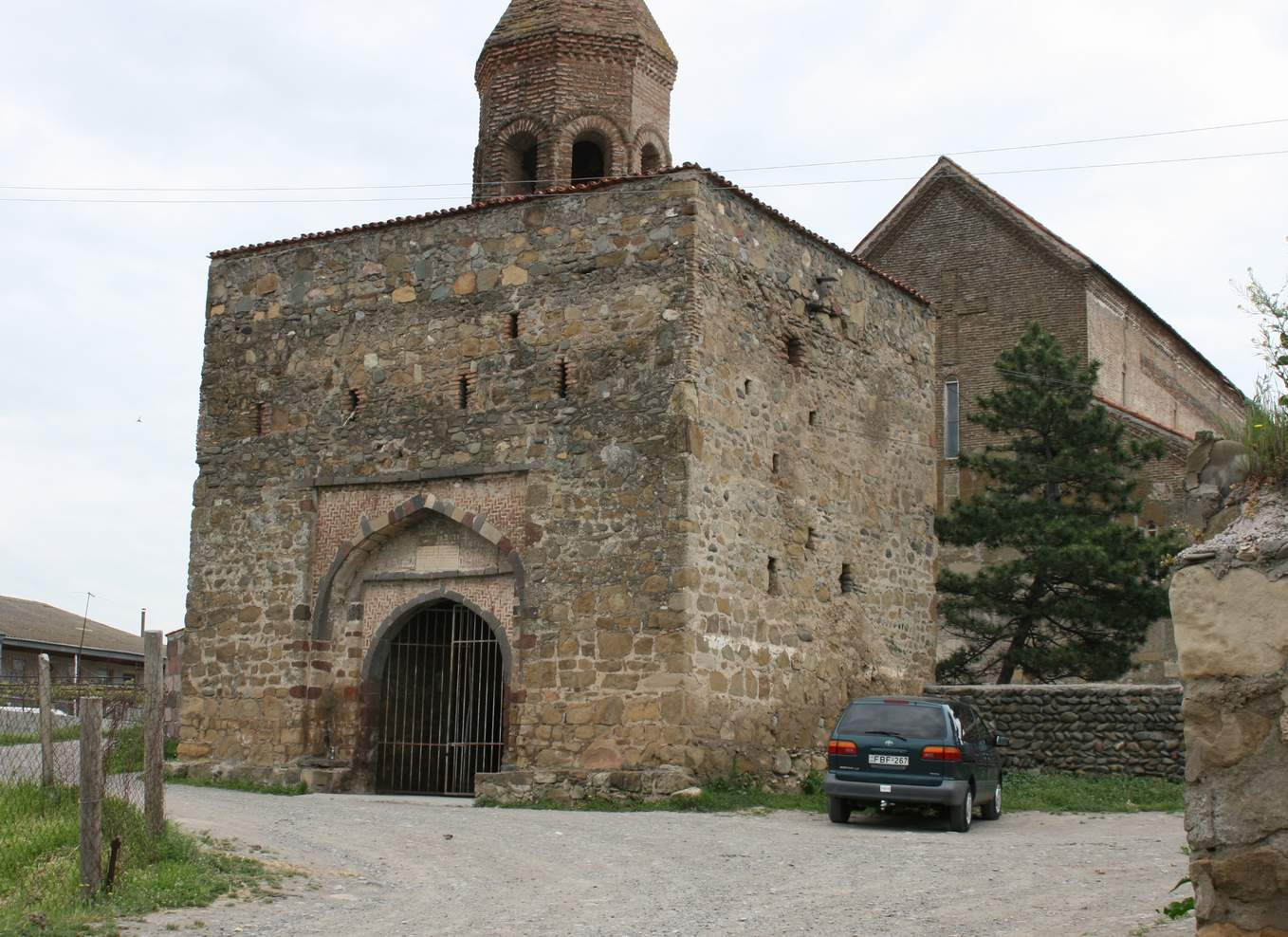
The bell-tower at Urbnisi.

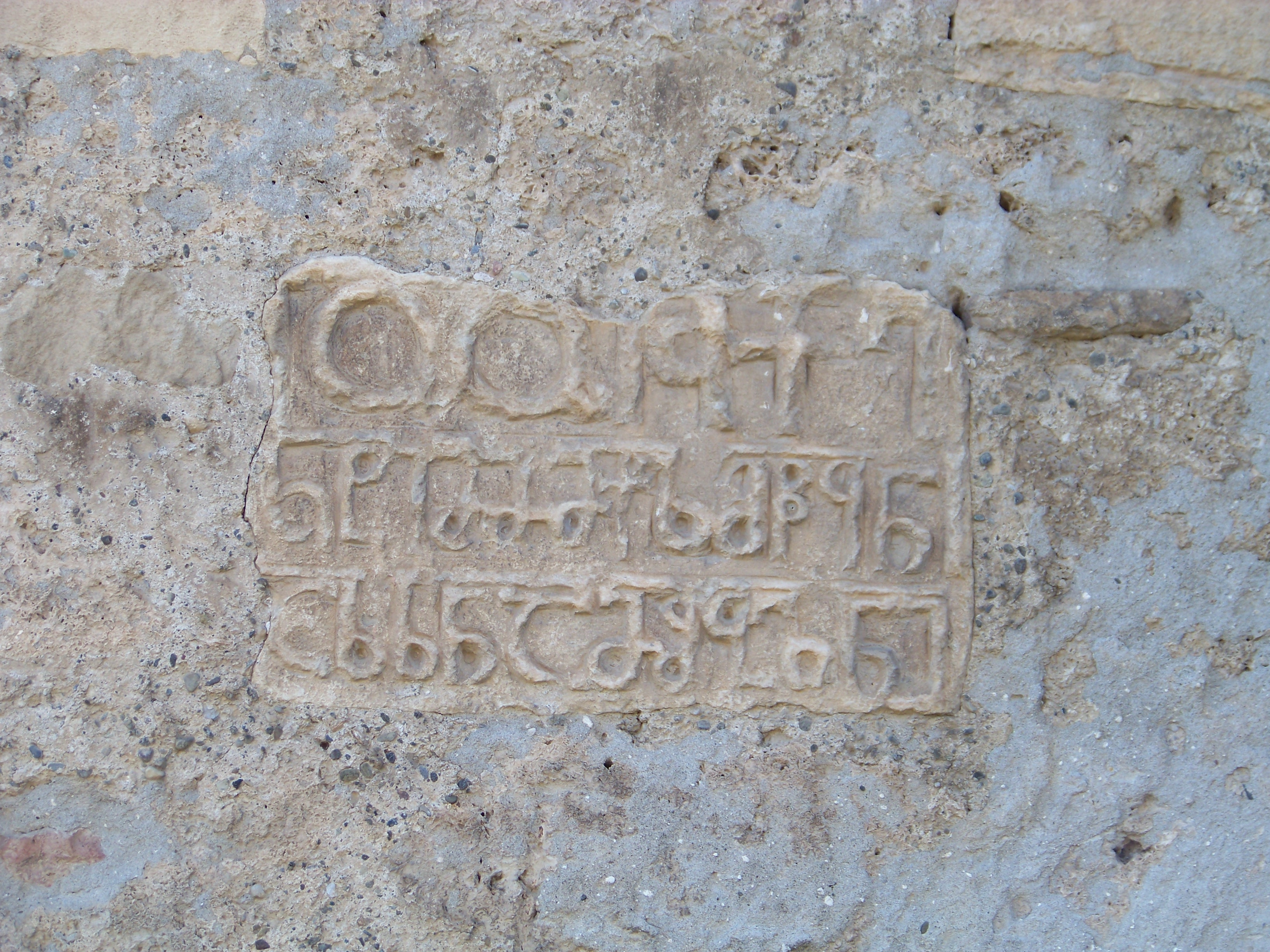
The foundational inscription on the north façade of the cathedral.

The Urbnisi church is a relatively long three-nave basilica, measuring 32.1 × 22.4 m. Principle construction phases are readily discernible in the church walls: the lower part is of stone, well-hewn sandstone blocks laid in regular horizontal courses representing the oldest layer and those placed irregularly constituting the 9th–10th-century reconstruction; the upper part of the church was built of thin bricks, supported by two brick arch-buttresses on either side, in 1668. There are three principal entrances,—by a north, south, and west door. Fragments of an architrave stone and horseshoe-shaped lunette on the east entrance are remnants of the first building layer.

The interior is composed of three naves separated by four pairs of cruciform pillars with simply profiled imposts hewn out of rectangular stone blocks and cuboid bases. The pillars and semicircular brick arches supported by them divide the barrel-vaulted central nave into five almost equal sized aisles. The sanctuary is elevated one step up from floor level. The lateral naves end to the east in chambers used as pastophoria. The church had two annexes: the one on the south is contemporaneous with the church and terminates to the east in a small chapel (eukterion), while the north annex is a later addition. The church is roofed with ceramic tiles.

=== Inscriptions ===
There are a few inscribed stones on the exterior and a high relief cross on the west façade. Apart from the text on the north façade, which enables the church to be dated to the 5th–6th century, there are four more asomtavruli inscriptions—one above the south door and the rest on the east façade—made by the 10th-century re-builders of the church and mentioning several persons, such as the bishop Tevdore and the deacon Abiathar. The east façade also bears several other inscriptions left by pilgrims.

=== Other structures ===
Some 15 m west of the church stands a three-storey bell-tower built of stone and brick and measuring 9.1 × 10.2. It was constructed—as related in an inscription on the west façade—at the behest of King Vakhtang VI and his wife Rusudan in 1706. Its ground floor acts as the porch. Near the church are other elements of the old Urbnisi settlements such as a circuit wall with ramparts, a 3rd-century bathhouse, a medieval winery, and an aqueduct.
