= Ortubani =

- Village
- Location within Georgia
- Coordinates: 41°57′03″N 43°45′13″E
- Country: Georgia
- Region: Shida Kartli
- Municipality: Kareli
- Community: Zguderi
- Elevation: 850 m (2,790 ft)

Population (2014)
  - Total: 72
- Time zone: +4
- Area code: +995

Ortubani (Georgian: ორთუბანი) is a village in Georgia, located in the Kareli Municipality of Shida Kartli, within the Zguderi community. It is situated on the right side of the Dzama River, in the northern foothills of the Trialeti Range. The village lies at an elevation of 850 metres above sea level, and is 14 kilometres from Kareli.

== Demographics ==
According to the 2014 census, the village has a population of 72.

Census year	Population	Male	Female
2002	54	26	28
2014	▲72	28	44
