= Ruisi (village) =

Ruisi რუისი
- Location in Georgia Ruisi (Shida Kartli)
- Coordinates: 42°2′4″N 43°57′25″E
- Country: Georgia
- Region: Shida Kartli
- Municipality: Kareli
- Elevation: 670 m (2,200 ft)

Population (2014)
  - Total: 5,139
- Time zone: UTC+4 (Georgian Time)

Ruisi (Georgian: რუისი [ɾuis̪i]) is a village in the Kareli District of Shida Kartli region of the Republic of Georgia. About 3 km from the district administrative center Kareli and 10 km from the city of Gori, Ruisi is one of the oldest centers of Christianity in Georgia. The bishop of Ruisi was mentioned already in the beginning of 6th century. The Ruisi cathedral dates back to the 8th century.

== The Ruisi massacre ==
Ruisi was the site of the Ruisi Massacre (Georgian: რუისის ტრაგედია), also known as the Phaniashvili Tragedy (Georgian: ფანიაშვილების ტრაგედია), a mass execution carried out by Bolshevik forces in early autumn of 1924. As part of a broader campaign of Soviet terror following the failed August uprising against Bolshevik rule, 94 villagers—primarily members of noble families—were executed near the Lashe-Tskali canal. Local agitators, aided by criminals and supported by the punitive squad from Gori, accused the families of supporting Kakutsa Cholokashvili’s anti-Soviet insurgency. The victims, including women and children, were lured under the pretense of relocation and then brutally murdered during the night. Only two people survived.

A small red-brick memorial, built in 2004 approximately 500 meters from the highway near Ruisi, now marks the site of the massacre. Erected on the initiative of village chairman Lado Buziashvili and with support from descendants of the victims, the memorial stands as a modest but powerful tribute to the lives lost and a symbol of remembrance within the local community.
