= Kintsvisi =

Kintsvisi may refer to:

- Kintsvisi Monastery
- Kintsvisi, Georgia
