= Sasireti (Kareli Municipality) =

Sasireti სასირეთი
- Village
- Location within Georgia
- Coordinates: 42°04′12″N 43°57′03″E
- Country: Georgia
- Region: Shida Kartli
- Municipality: Kareli
- Community: Giganti
- Elevation: 710 m (2,330 ft)

Population (2014)
  - Total: 304
- Time zone: +4
- Area code: +995

Sasireti (Georgian: სასირეთი) is a village in Georgia, in the Kareli Municipality of Shida Kartli, within the Giganti community. It is located on the Shida Kartli Plain, at an elevation of 710 metres above sea level. The village is 10 kilometres away from Kareli.

== Demographics ==
According to the 2014 census, the village has a population of 304.

Census year	Population	Male	Female
2002	370	177	193
2014	▼304	164	140
