= Shaviklde =

There are two mountains called Shaviklde (Georgian: შავიკლდე, meaning "Black Cliff") in Georgia:

- at an elevation of 3,578 m, at 42°15′14″N 45°37′9″E, at the border to Dagestan (Kakheti)
- at an elevation of 2,850 m, the highest peak of the Trialeti Range at 41°39′32″N 43°26′17″E (Samtskhe–Javakheti).
