= Leonti Mroveli =

11th-century Georgian chronicler

Leonti Mroveli (Georgian: ლეონტი მროველი) was the 11th-century Georgian chronicler, presumably an ecclesiastic. Mroveli is not his last name, but the adjective for the diocese of Ruisi, whose bishop he probably was. Hence, another modern English transliteration of his name is Leontius of Ruisi.

Apart from late annotations to the manuscripts of The Georgian Chronicles, an archbishop of Ruisi named Leonti is mentioned only thrice: once in an 11th-century manuscript from Mount Athos; once in Euthymius of Athos's translation of Chrysostom's commentary to St. Matthew; and, most specifically, on a 1066 inscription from the Trekhvi caves in central Georgia. Assumptions that Leonti Mroveli belonged to the eighth or early tenth century now seem implausible. This Mroveli no longer occupied the post in 1103, for he is not attested in the act of the Georgian ecclesiastic synod convened at Ruisi and the neighboring cathedral of Urbnisi by King David IV. Leonti is credited by some historians with having written several pieces of the medieval compendium of Georgian chronicles, while others consider him only a compiler of earlier texts. In any case, Leonti Mroveli as chronicler shifted the balance of Georgian literature from the ecclesiastic to the secular.
