= Bateti Lake =

Lake in Georgia

- ბატეთის ტბა (Georgian)
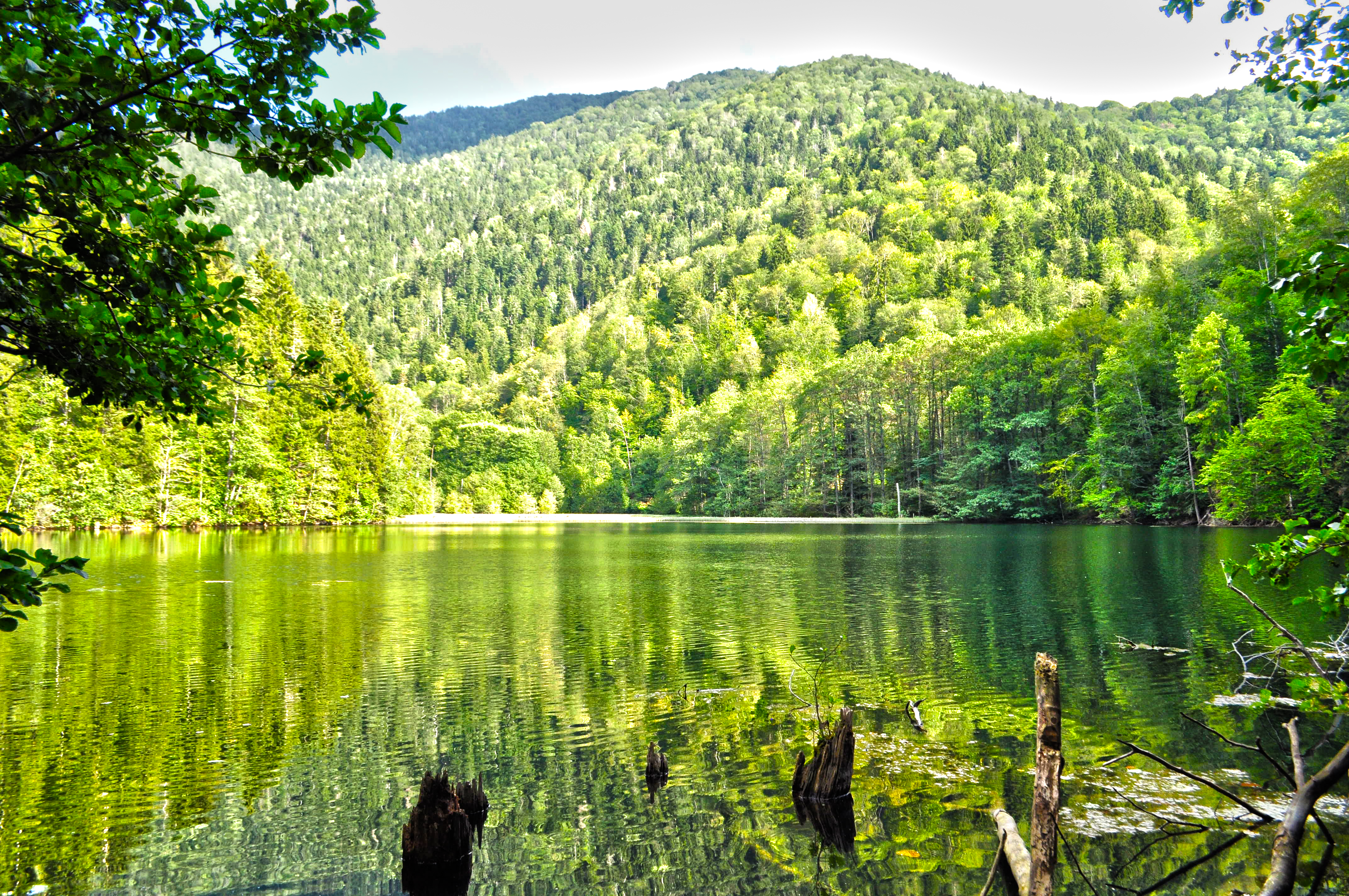
- Bateti lake in Fall

- Location within Shida Kartli Location within Georgia
- Interactive map of Bateti Lake
- Coordinates: 41°53′46″N 43°46′06″E
- Primary outflows: spring
- Catchment area: 5 km^{2} (1.9 sq mi)
- Basin countries: Georgia
- Surface area: 0.02 km^{2} (0.0077 sq mi)
- Average depth: 7 m (23 ft)
- Max. depth: 12 m (39 ft)
- Water volume: 0.14 km^{3} (0.034 cu mi)
- Surface elevation: 1,313 m (4,308 ft)

Bateti Lake (Georgian: ბატეთის ტბა, romanized: bat'etis t'ba) is a landslide lake on Batetistskali River located near village Kodmani in the valley of Dzama river, Kareli Municipality, in Shida Kartli region of Georgia, at 1313 metres above sea level. The water area of the lake is only 0.02 km^{2}. Maximal depth is 12 meters.

== Fauna ==
Lake is habitat of near-threatened species of newt (Ommatotriton ophryticus).

== Photo gallery ==
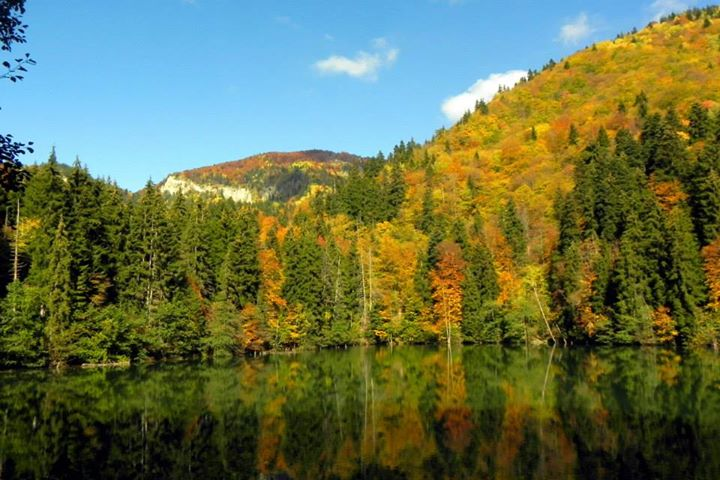

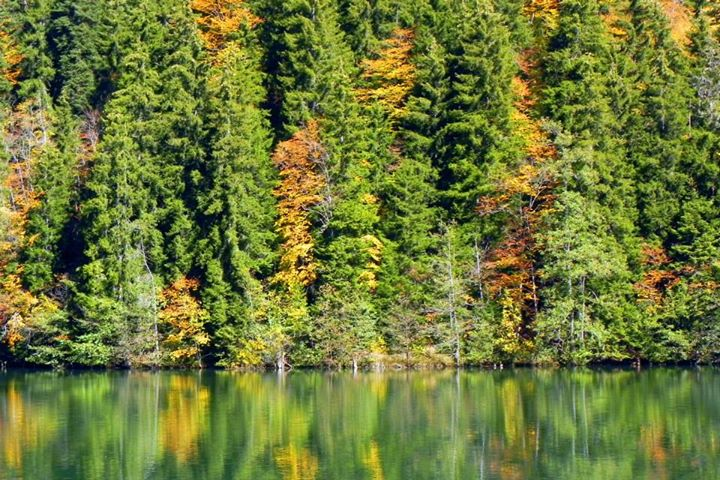

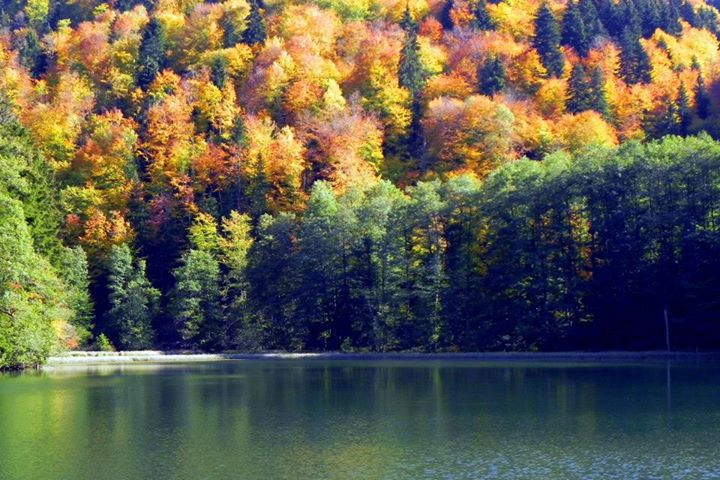
