= Samtsevrisi church =

- სამწევრისის ტაძარი
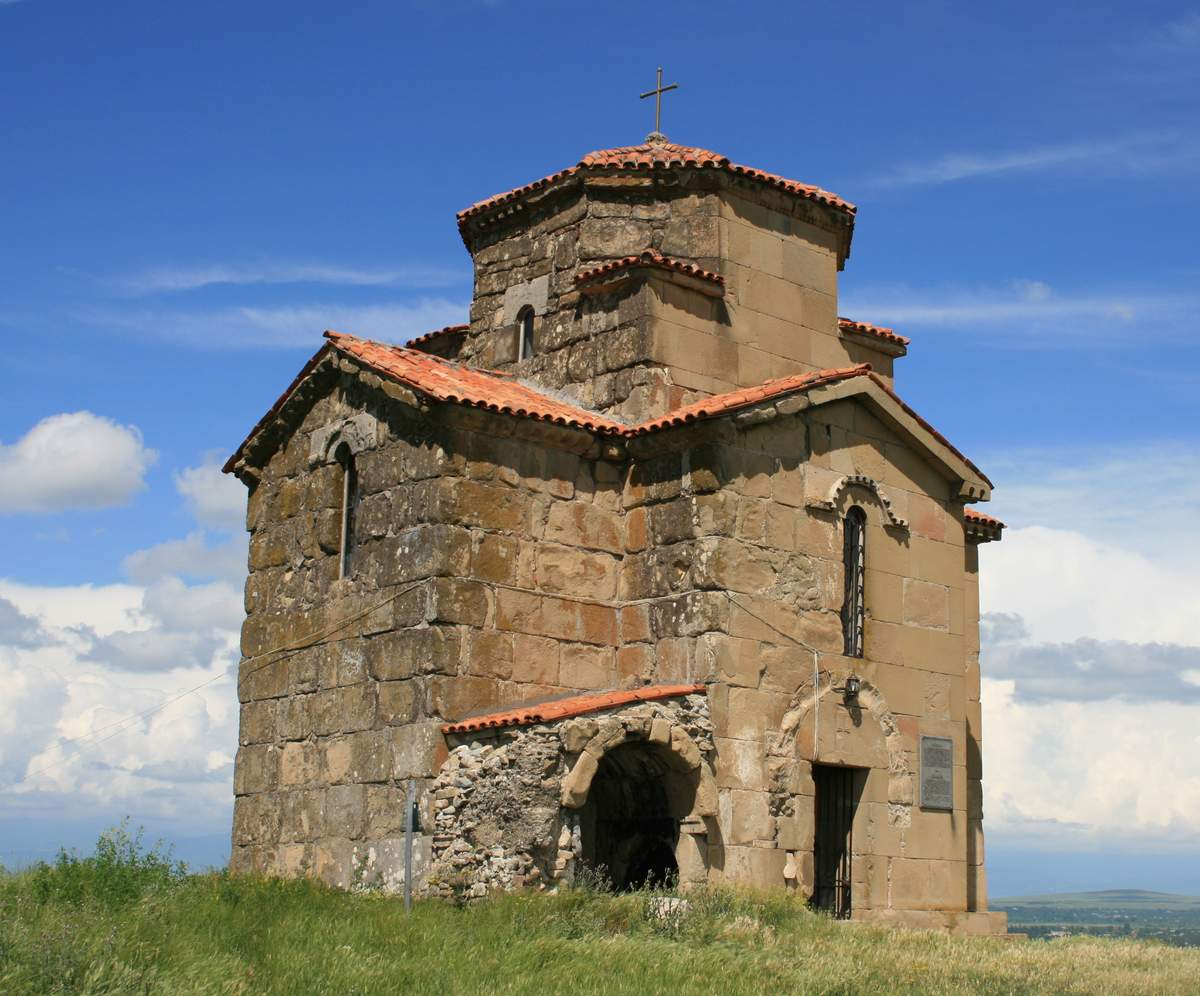
- Samtsevrisi church
- Interactive map of Samtsevrisi church
- Location: Kareli Municipality, Shida Kartli, Georgia
- Coordinates: 42.014722°N 43.844444°E
- Type: Church

The Samtsevrisi church of Saint George (Georgian: სამწევრისის წმინდა გიორგის ტაძარი, romanized: samts'evrisis ts'minda giorgis t'adzari) is an early medieval Georgian Orthodox church in the village of Samtsevrisi, Kareli Municipality, in Georgia's region of Shida Kartli. It is a "free-cross" plan church and stylistically dated to the first half of the 7th century. The church is inscribed on the list of the Immovable Cultural Monuments of National Significance of Georgia.

== Location and architecture ==
The Samtsevrisi church is built on a low hill on the left bank of the Dzama river, at the eastern end of the watershed plateau between the Kura and Dzama valleys. Due to its commanding position, the church is visible from Georgia's main east–west highway and railway to the north.

Samtsevrisi is a small dome church built of hewn grayish-reddish sandstone blocks, with the dimensions of 9.6 × 8.8 m, rising to the height of 10.6 m. The general proportions are harmonious and complete. Its "free-cross" design, with a horseshoe apse in a cross plan, stylistically dates to the early 7th century, with a bit of the 16th-century stonework—a single-nave funeral chapel—to the southwest. The dome rests on an octagonal base, supported by four large and eight smaller squinches and containing two windows, to the east and to the west. Three more window are found in the lower part of the building. The entrance to the church is from the south. The only decorations are the pommels and cornices around windows. The building was significantly damaged in an earthquake on 8 May 1940 and was subsequently repaired by a team of Georgian specialists between 1950 and 1953.

Two more interesting structures can be found in the vicinity. The mausoleum of Merab Panaskerteli is situated next, south to the church, with carvings, depicting Merab with his wife and the son. To the north-west down the mountain the Samtsevrisi Castle and Monastery is visible.

== Inscriptions ==
The church bears two Georgian inscriptions, both made in the medieval asomtavruli script: the one on the eastern façade commemorates the construction of a water canal in the 20th regnal year of Constantine III of Abkhazia, that is, c. 914, by Domnisos and Georgi Tualaisadze. while the other, on the southern façade, makes mention of the local nobleman, Merab Panaskerteli, who had renovated the church in the late 15th or early 16th century.
