= Ruisi Cathedral =

Georgian Orthodox church in Ruisi, Georgia

Ruisi cathedral of the Mother of God
- რუისის ღვთისმშობლის ტაძარი
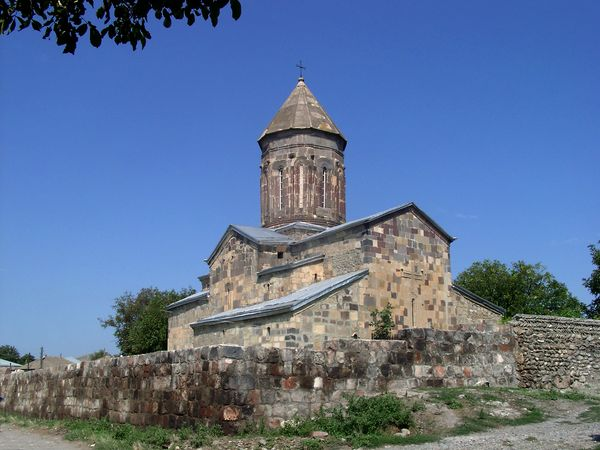
- Ruisi cathedral.
- Interactive map of Ruisi cathedral of the Mother of God
- Location: Ruisi, Kareli Municipality; Shida Kartli, Georgia
- Coordinates: 42.037872°N 43.956937°E
- Type: Cross-in-square church

The Ruisi cathedral of the Mother of God (Georgian: რუისის ღვთისმშობლის ტაძარი, romanized: ruisis ghvtismshoblis t'adzari) is a Georgian Orthodox church in the village of Ruisi in Georgia's east-central Shida Kartli region. Originally built in the 8th–9th century, the church was remodeled in the 11th century and rebuilt in the 15th century. It is a cross-in-square church with a tall dome and a horseshoe apse on the east. The cathedral is inscribed on the list of Georgia's Immovable Cultural Monuments of National Significance.

== History ==
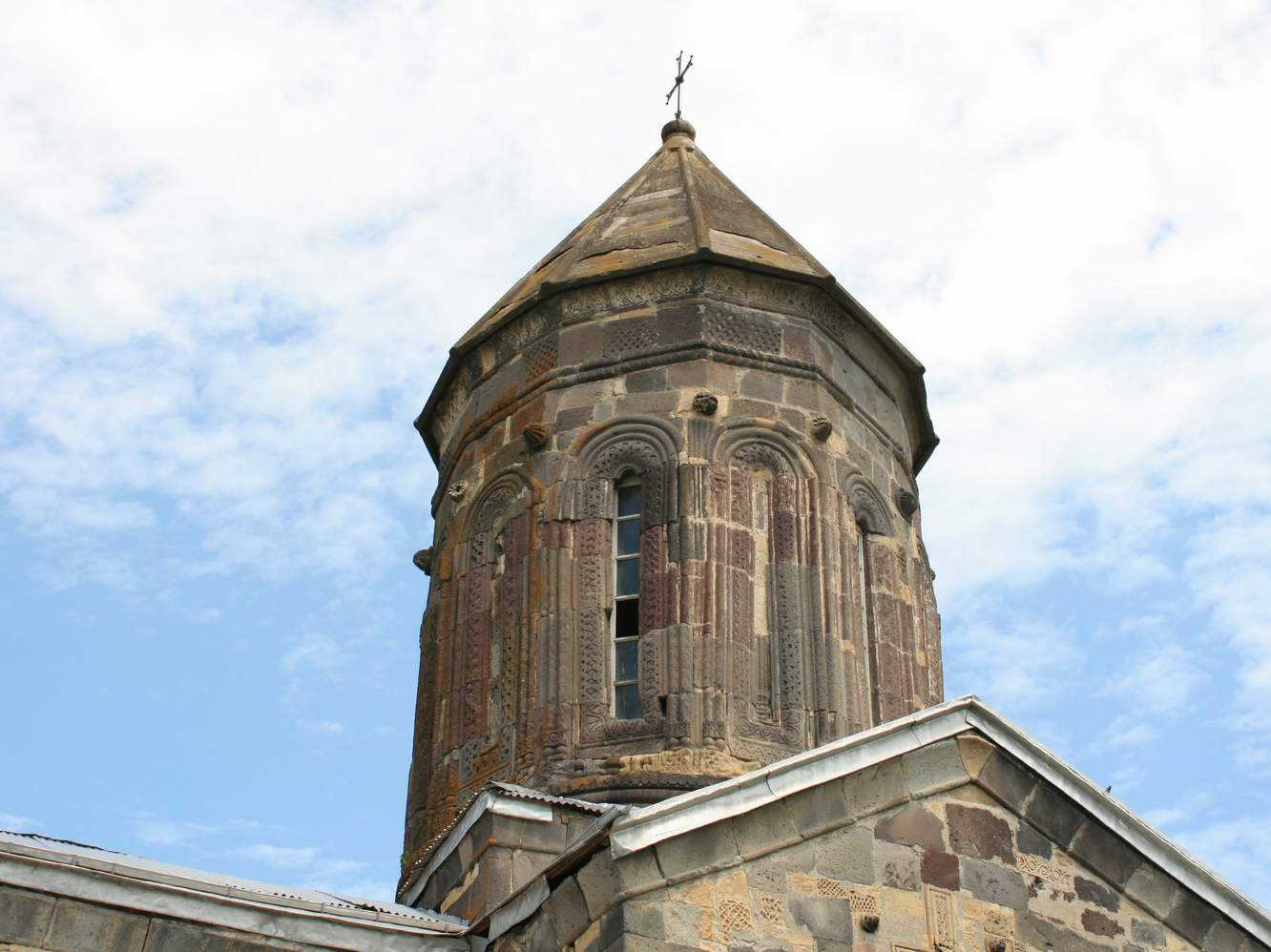
Ruisi church. A dome.

The Ruisi cathedral stands in the centre of the village of Ruisi, Kareli Municipality, in the region of Shida Kartli. It is visible just north of the Gori-Khashuri highway.

Ruisi is known in the history of Georgia as the place of coronation of the boy-king George II by Liparit IV, Duke of Kldekari in 1055 and one of the two locations of the landmark church council convened by King David IV in 1103. Ruisi was the seat of a Georgian Orthodox bishop, known by the adjective Mroveli. One of the bishops, Leonti, is credited with compiling a corpus of the Georgian chronicles in the 11th century. In 1695, King Alexander IV of Imereti, prisoner at Ruisi, was killed here and buried at the Ruisi church.

The current edifice is the result of several construction phases, destructions, and protection interventions. The remains of the oldest construction phase date to the 8th or 9th century, and can be found in the altar area. The church was subsequently remodeled in the 10th century, and further, in the 11th century as related in an inscription at the apse conch in the north porch. Its dome фтв and the northern aisle come from the latter reconstruction. The cathedral was almost completely destroyed in Timur's invasions of Georgia in 1400 and rebuilt by King Alexander I of Georgia (r. 1412–1442, who introduced a special tax to raise funds for the reconstruction of Ruisi and Mtskheta; An inscription in the western façade commemorates Alexander, while that in the southern façade mentions the architect Shalva. The church was refurbished by Dionise Laradze, bishop of Ruisi, in the 16th century and by Queen Mariam of Kartli in the 1660s. The remaining frescoes were covered in plaster in the 19th century. Ruisi was severely damaged in the 1920 Gori earthquake and repaired in two major efforts of 1936–1938 and 1950–1953.

== Layout ==
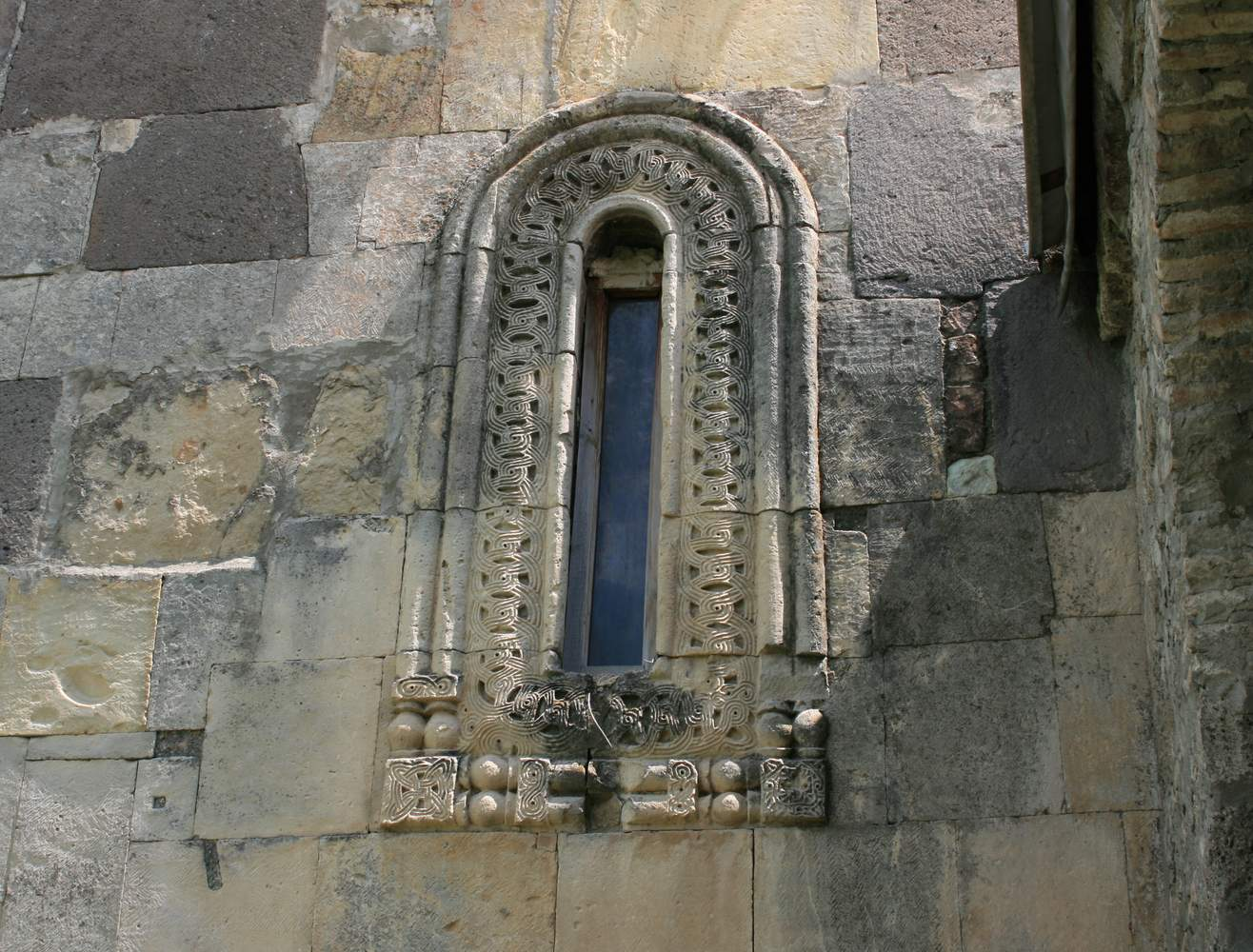
A window with an ornate frame.

The Ruisi cathedral is a cross-in-square church, measuring 27.3 × 19.6 m and rising to the height of 23.3 m. It is built of well-dressed sandstone blocks, with the additional use of basalt, limestone, and brick at the time of reconstruction. The building stands on a plinth of two steps. It can be accessed through three rectangular doorways, on the west, south, and north. A narthex, attached to the west door and open in a series of arches on three sides, is a 15th-century annex. The tall dodecagonal dome rests upon four free-standing piers. The transition from the square central bay to the circular plan of the drum is effected through pendentives. The dome is pierced by 12 windows, six of them built up in the 15th century. Two more columns are positioned in the western part of the bay. A somewhat deformed horseshoe apse is at the tip of the deep bema. A tall arched window is cut in the apse, with an arched niche below it.

The sanctuary is flanked by pastophoria on either side, connecting to the corresponding naves with arched openings. Both are covered with domical vaults, supported by four squinches. The sanctuary is separated from the rest of the bay by an ornate wood-engraved iconostasis installed in 1781. Fragments of the late medieval frescoes are visible in part of the interior. The dome has tinplate roofing; the rest of the roof is tiled. The façades are adorned with decorative stone carvings, especially around the doorways and windows. A special decorative feature of the cathedral is polychromy, both exterior and interior. The façades and the interior of the northern aisle are laid out in colorful quadras. The ornament of the apse floor is adorned in three color stones. Fine ornamentation covers cornices.

West of the church stands a bell-tower built in a defensive wall which encircles the entire complex. Constructed in the 17th century, it is a three-storey structure, measuring 7.4 × 6.8 m. Its ground storey contains arched passage, the first was a guardhouse, and the upper a belfry.
