= Samtsevrisi Castle =

Medieval fortress in Georgia

Coordinates: 42.0188°N 43.8389°E

- სამწევრისის ციხე
- Village of Samtsevrisi, Kareli Municipality, region of Shida Kartli, in Georgia
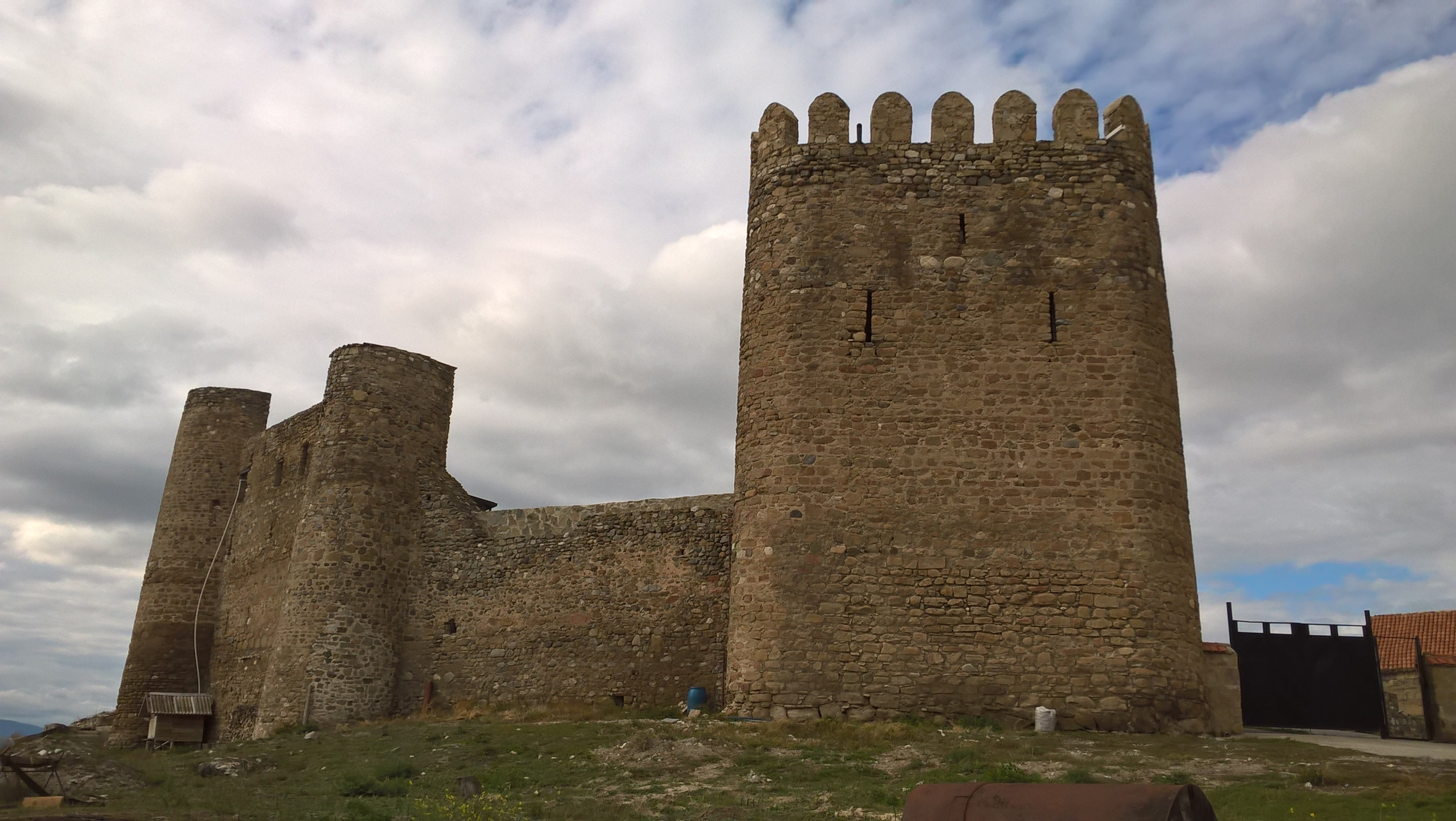
- Samtsevrisi Castle

Site information
- Type: Cyclopean fortress
- Condition: Ruined

Location

Site history
- Materials: stone

Cultural Heritage Monument of Georgia
- Official name: Castle Complex
- Designated: March 30, 2006; 20 years ago
- Reference no.: 2091
- Item Number in Cultural Heritage Portal: 6869;
- Date of entry in the registry: October 3, 2007; 18 years ago

Samtsevrisi Castle is a large medieval Georgian castle or fortress in the village of Samtsevrisi, Kareli Municipality, in Georgia's region of Shida Kartli. Its construction time and ownership have been unknown. Presumably, it belonged to noble Panaskerteli-Tsisishvili ancestors, who settled here in the 15th century. One of the castle towers, though, belongs to the early medieval times. Meanwhile, the place was already inhabited by the 2nd millennium B.C. Part of the castle currently serves as the premises of Samtsevrisi Monasteri (since 1997).

== History ==
It is not clear when and who built the castle. Archeological discoveries on the place revealed large amount of ceramic fragments, dating from the beginning of the 2nd millennium B.C. to the late medieval times. The large tower of the castle was built in the early medieval period. The large size of the castle presumes that it belonged to a rich prince, probably of Panaskerteli family, who settled in the castle in the 15th century.

== Architecture ==
Built on the high, right bank of Mtkvari River, near the mouth of Dzama River, the castle has a shape of a prolonged polygon, with the area of 2000 sq. meters. The castle garrison was homed in its northern part, separated from the southern citadel. The southern part also has a hall church. The prominent largest tower was exceptionally well-built. The citadel encircled the family palace.
