= Gori City Hall =

- გორის მერია
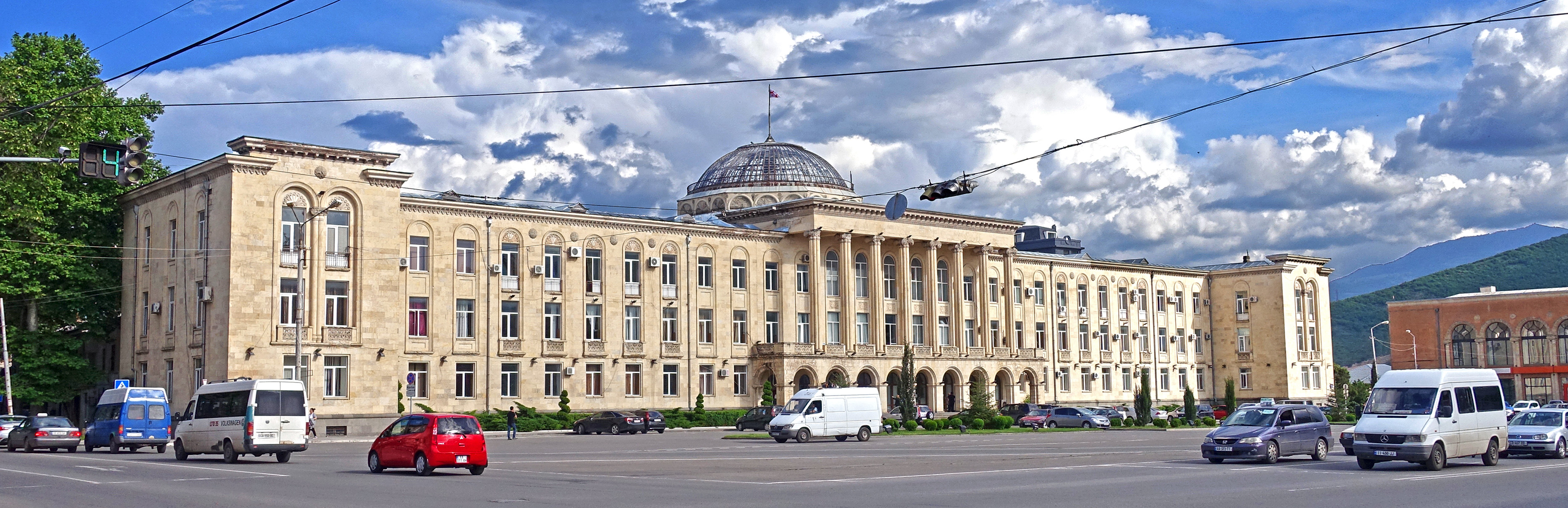
- Interactive map of the Gori City Hall area
- Alternative names: Gori Municipality

General information
- Location: Gori, Georgia, Georgia
- Coordinates: 41°58′54″N 44°06′45″E
- Owner: Georgian government

Website
- www.gori-municipality.ge

Gori City Hall (Georgian: გორის მერია, goris meria) is an administrative building of Gori, Georgia, a city in eastern Georgia, which serves as the regional capital of Shida Kartli.

== History ==
According to media reports, the hall has been a target of shelling by Russian troops during the 2008 Russian Georgian war. Until 2010, there was a monument to Joseph Stalin in front of the City Hall who was born in this city.
