= Kintsvisi Monastery =

Medieval Georgian monastery

Kintsvisi Monastery ყინწვისის მონასტერი (in Georgian)
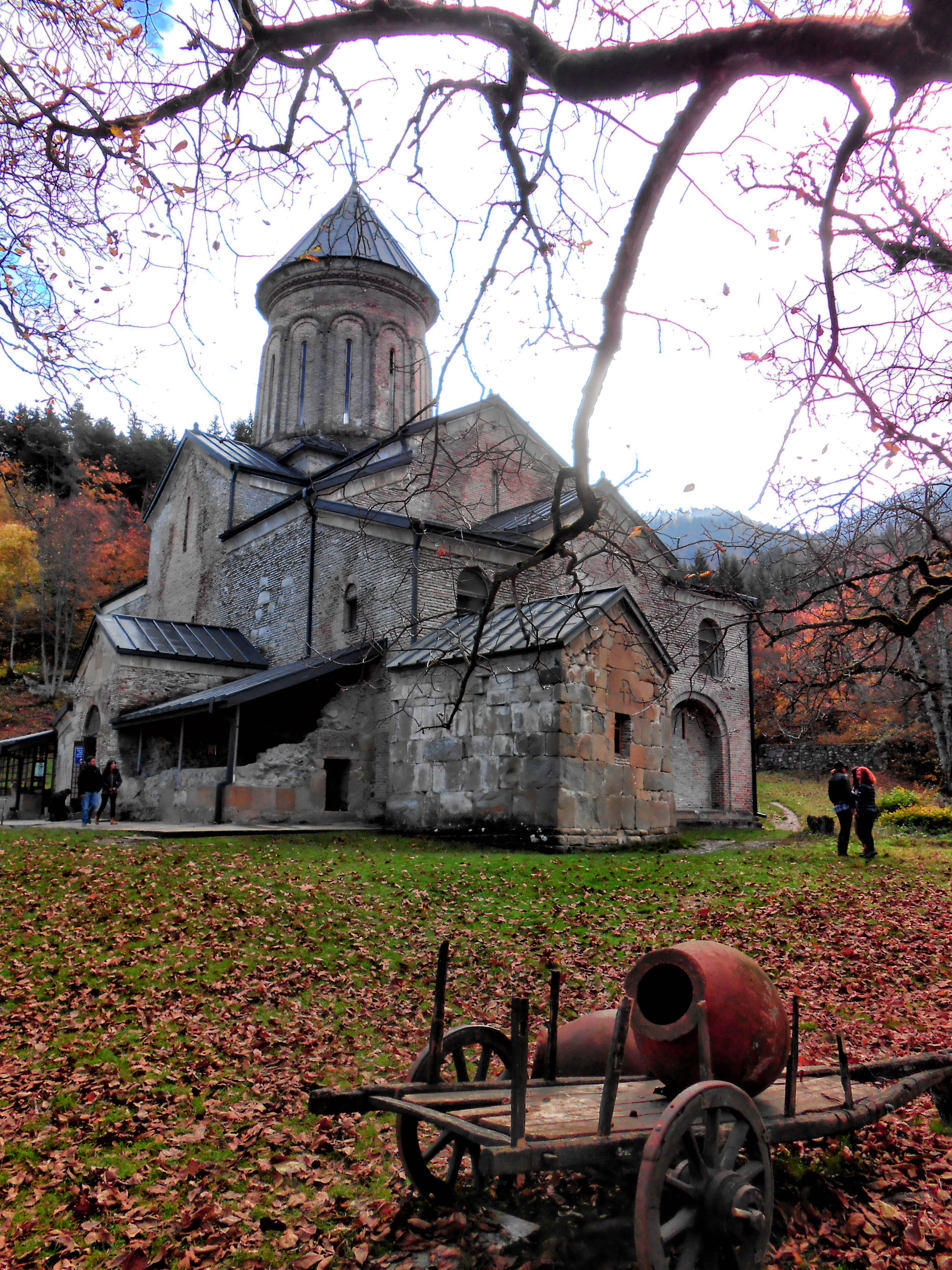

Religion
- Affiliation: Georgian Orthodox

Location
- Location: Kintsvisi, Shida Kartli Province (Mkhare), Georgia
- Interactive map of Kintsvisi Monastery ყინწვისის მონასტერი (in Georgian)
- Coordinates: 41.9605331°N 43.8343085°E

Architecture
- Type: Church
- Completed: 13th century
- Immovable Cultural Monument of National Significance of Georgia
- Official name: Kintsvisi Complex
- Designated: November 7, 2006; 19 years ago
- Reference no.: 2104
- Item Number in Cultural Heritage Portal: 10644
- Date of entry in the registry: October 3, 2007; 18 years ago

Kintsvisi Monastery (Georgian: ყინწვისი, Qinc'visi) is a Georgian Orthodox monastery in the Shida Kartli region, eastern Georgia, 10 kilometers from the town Kareli, on a forested slope of a high mountain of the Dzama valley. Its main church is an exceptional example of a brick church from the Georgian Golden Age period. The monumental mural is one of the largest among the Medieval Georgian artistic ensembles.

== History ==
The Kintsvisi Monastery complex consists of three churches, of uncertain origin. The central (main) central church dedicated to St Nicholas is thought to date to the early 13th century, in what is generally regarded as the Georgian Golden Age. Its dating was possible due to the presence on the murals of the figures of three Georgian kings of that period. A very small chapel standing next to it is dedicated to St George, and dates from around the same time.

The oldest church, dedicated to St Mary dates from the 10-11th centuries, but is mostly in ruins.

In the 15th century the main church narthex was rebuilt by the local prince Zaza Panaskerteli. Its internal space was divided into three parts and decorated by frescoes. Among them also the unique depiction of Zaza himself.

The site is currently listed by the World Monuments Fund as a field project.

== Architecture ==
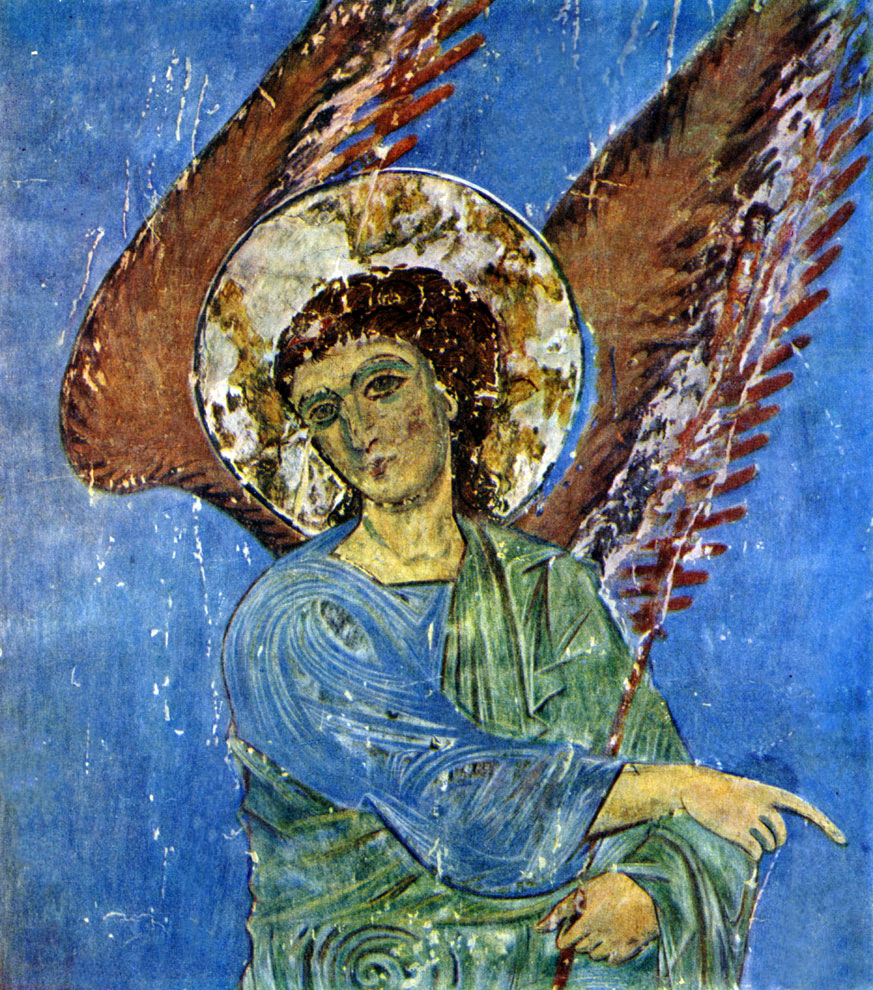
"Kintsvisi Angel", complete with scarce and expensive natural ultramarine paint, evidences increasing sophistication and resources of Georgian masters following the reign of George III.

The main church is a large inscribed-cross domed brick building which houses unique examples of medieval mural art from the early 13th century. Made of red brick, the church is harmoniously fit into the surrounding mountainous, forested landscape. This building material was not commonly used for construction in that period, representing exceptional case for the beginning of the 13th century. The dome was also originally covered in three-colored roof tiles. Its tholobate has 12 windows.

Though the internal space is cross-shaped, the church is rectangular in general plan. The only altar is flanked by a prothesis and a sacristy. High semicircular arches connect the lateral naves with the western arm. The narthex has two floors, with the lower floor being the portal and the lower the choir. The portal has been later divided into three parts.

The church facades originally lack any decorations. They are present only in form of window arches on the dome tholobate, also made of special bricks.

Except for the main church the monastery territory contains other buildings of different age and preservation, surrounded by the ruins of the common wall. Among the ruins, the bell tower, included into the northern wall, and two hall churches can be recognized. The smaller St. George's Church, standing close to the western facade, is in rather good condition. From the larger St. Mary's Church, standing in the north-west part of the area, only the apse with frescoes remains.

== Murals ==
The interior is well-illuminated from the windows in the tholobate and in each arm of the cross. Original frescoes entirely covered the walls. In spite of being damaged, Kintsvisi murals are still among the largest and well-preserved Georgian Medieval wall paintings. In the central position of the cupola is the Hodegetria flanked by the archangels Michael and Gabriel. At the central part of cupola arch is an expressed cross as a medallion. Medallions with the Four Evangelists adorn the pendentives. Images of archangels are repeated on south and west walls of the church. Scenes from the New Testament are presented on north walls, as are portraits of Georgian kings, Giorgi III, Tamar and Giorgi IV Lasha.

Particularly remarkable is the figure of a sitting angel (the so-called “Kintsvisi Archangel”) from the Resurrection composition pointing at the open sarcophagus in a gracious manner, represented above the kings' figures, between two windows. The expressive bending of the head, the wing movement, soft drawing of the angel's shoulders are accompanied by the fine linear decorations of the blue clothes on blue background.

The eastern side contains the figure of Mary with Jesus in hands in the conch, the Eucharist in the bema and the church fathers, walking from to the bema from two sides, depicted in a three quarter turn on the apse wall. All the figures are expressive and dynamic. These murals date to before 1205 and rank, due to the lavish use of lapis-lazuli to color their backgrounds, among the most beautiful paintings of that period.

These murals were ordered by Anton Gnolistavisdze, a local feudal magnate who served as a royal minister. His fresco with a model of a church in his hand is represented on the lower register of the south wall, along with a severely damaged cycle of images from the life of St Nicholas, and depictions of various Georgian saints.

The murals of the narthex are of a later date, and were painted by the order of a prominent person of the 15th century, Zaza Panaskerteli, whose portrait is represented here as well.

The church of the Virgin Mary also contains an enthroned Hodegetria with a Communion of the Apostles in its ruined apse. The walls of this church were presumably entirely painted in the same manner as the main church, but everything but the apse has collapsed into ruins down the side of the mountain.
