= Council of Ruisi-Urbnisi =

Council of Ruisi-Urbnisi (Georgian: რუის-ურბნისის საეკლესიო კრება) was a synod convened at Ruisi and Urbnisi by the Georgian monarch David IV in 1103, that limited the church’s authority, expelled rebellious clergy, and expanded the royal administration into the clerical sphere.

== Overview ==
Throughout the 10th-11th centuries the Georgian Orthodox Church came into possession of vast land holdings, turning it into “state within a state” and clashing with the royal authority. In 1089, David IV became the King of Georgia and began to actively reform the country. In 1103 he convened the "Ruis-Urbnisi Church Council" at which he purged the clerical hierarchy of his opponents. The aim was the subjection of the church to state power, which was necessary for David given his plans of centralization and the reordering of church affairs.

He gave unprecedented power to his friend and advisor George of Chqondidi. The office of the powerful Archbishop of Chqondidi was merged with that of Mtsignobartukhutsesi, chief adviser to the king on all state issues, and the new office of Chqondidel-Mtsignobartukhutsesi introduced direct royal authority into the church. The new chancellor also was given judicial powers and influence in both domestic and foreign affairs. For the following centuries, the Church would remain a crucial feudal institution, whose economical and political power would always be at least equal to that of the main noble families.

Ruis-Urbnisi Council adopted a special Code (Dzeglistsera lit. "pillar-writing"). It's believed that the author of the "Code" is Arsen Iqaltoeli, the translator of the "Great Nomocanon". It condemned Armenian Monophysitism in stronger terms than ever before.

== Sources ==
- Synod of Ruis-Urbnisi (1103), ed. E. Gabidzashvili, Tbilisi, 1978
