= Kareli, Georgia =

Kareli ქარელი
- Town
- Interactive map of Kareli
- Location within Georgia Location within Shida Kartli
- Coordinates: 42°01′17″N 43°53′35″E
- Country: Georgia (country)
- Mkhare: Shida Kartli
- District: Kareli
- Elevation: 620 m (2,030 ft)

Population (2024)
  - Total: 6,775
- Time zone: UTC+4 (Georgian Time)

Kareli (Georgian: ქარელი) is a town in Shida Kartli, Georgia, located on the right bank of the Mtkvari, 94 km west of the country's capital of Tbilisi. Kareli became the district center in 1939, transformed into a township in 1962, declared a city in 1981. There is a railway station, industrial enterprises, healthcare, educational and cultural institutions in Kareli.

== Overview ==
Kareli is first mentioned as a village in the 1715 documents. It was a property of the Tsitsishvili noble family. It acquired the status of a town under the Soviet government in 1981. Since 1939, it has been an administrative center of the homonymous district. As of the 2014 census, Kareli had a population of 6,654.

Kareli has a humid subtropical climate with moderately cold winters and long warm summers. The town's environs are a home to several architectural monuments of medieval Georgia such as the churches of Zghuderi, Samtsevrisi, Ruisi, and Kintsvisi, and the fortress of Ortubani (Dzama).

== See also ==
- Shida Kartli
