= Trialeti Range =

Mountain range in Georgia

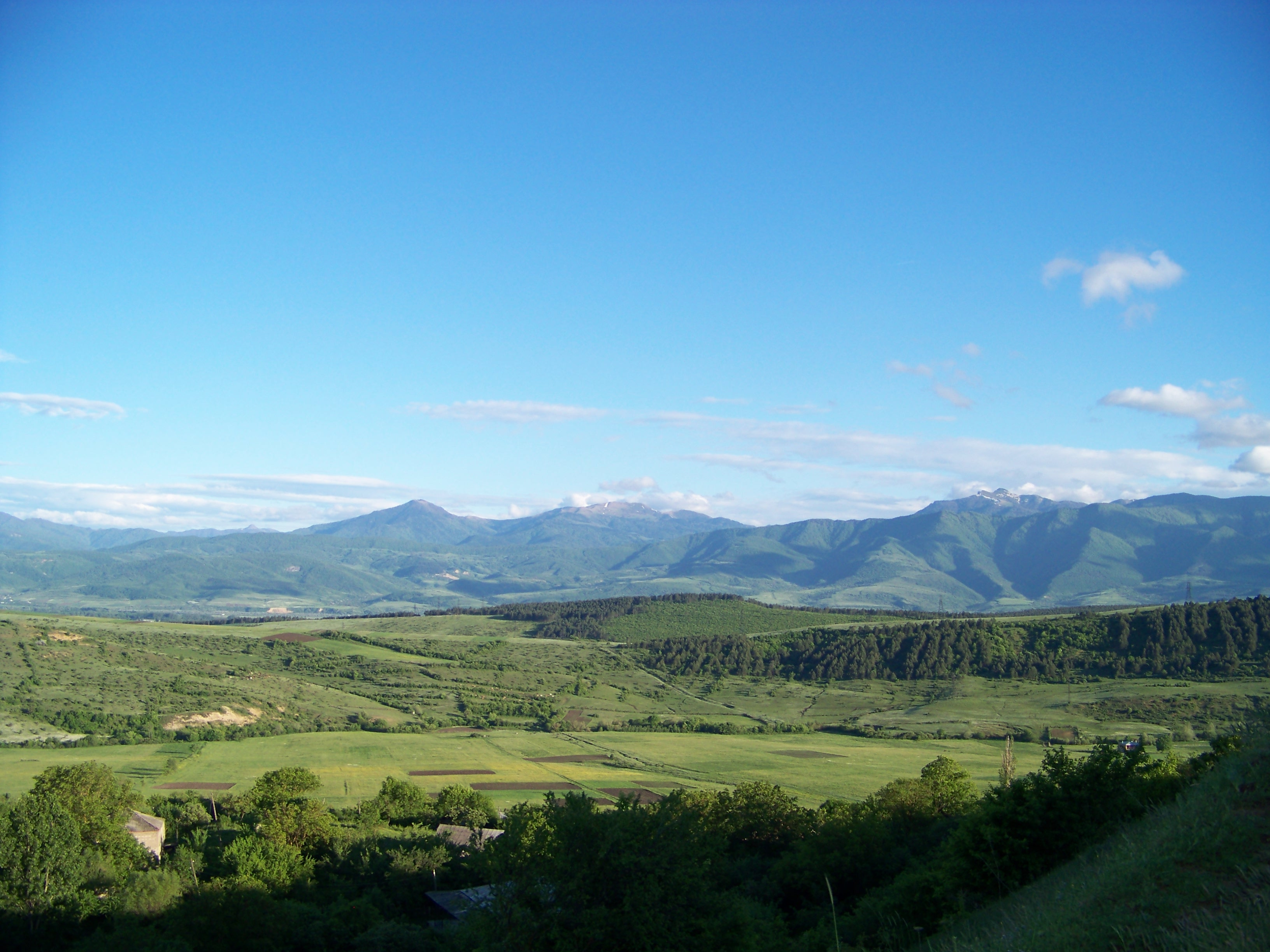
- View of Trialeti Range at Khashuri district.

Highest point
- Peak: Shaviklde
- Elevation: 2,850 m (9,350 ft)

Dimensions
- Length: 144 km (89 mi)
- Width: 30 km (19 mi)

Geography
- Location within Samtskhe-Javakheti Location within Georgia
- Country: Georgia
- Region(s): Samtskhe-Javakheti, Kvemo Kartli
- Range coordinates: 41°45′00″N 43°49′50″E
- Parent range: Caucasus Mountains

Trialeti Range (Georgian: თრიალეთის ქედი) is an east-west mountain range of the Lesser Caucasus Mountains in the Samtskhe–Javakheti region of southern Georgia.

The eastern edge of the Range runs along the western border of Tbilisi, while the western edge lies along River Mtkvari to the southwest of Borjomi. The length of the Trialeti Range is 144 kilometers and the maximum width is 30 kilometers. The mountain range was built up by volcanic activity during the Paleogene period. Young, andesite lava flows are common in the western part of the Range. The highest point is Mount Shaviklde (meaning "black cliff" in Georgian) at an elevation of 2,850 meters above sea level (9,348 ft.). The slopes of the Range are mainly covered by deciduous forests made up of oak, beech, and hornbeam. The western parts of Trialeti are covered by coniferous and mixed forests made up of fir, spruce, pine, beech, and oak.

== Village Trialeti ==
Trialeti is also a village situated in the range, between Tsalka and Dmanisi, at 41°30′N 44°10′E
