= Kareli Municipality =

Coordinates: 42°01′28″N 43°54′04″E

Kareli Municipality ქარელის მუნიციპალიტეტი
- Municipality
- Mdzovreti fortress

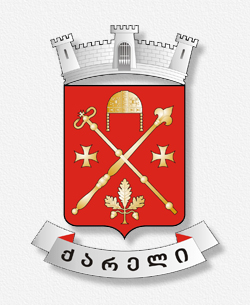
- Flag Seal

- Location of Kareli Municipality in Georgia
- Country: Georgia
- Region: Shida Kartli
- Capital: Kareli
- various: 1 town, 1 townlet, and 73 villages

Area
  - Total: 687.9 km^{2} (265.6 sq mi)

Population (2014)
  - Total: 41,316
  - Density: 60.06/km^{2} (155.6/sq mi)
- Time zone: UTC+4
- Website: Official site of shida kartli region

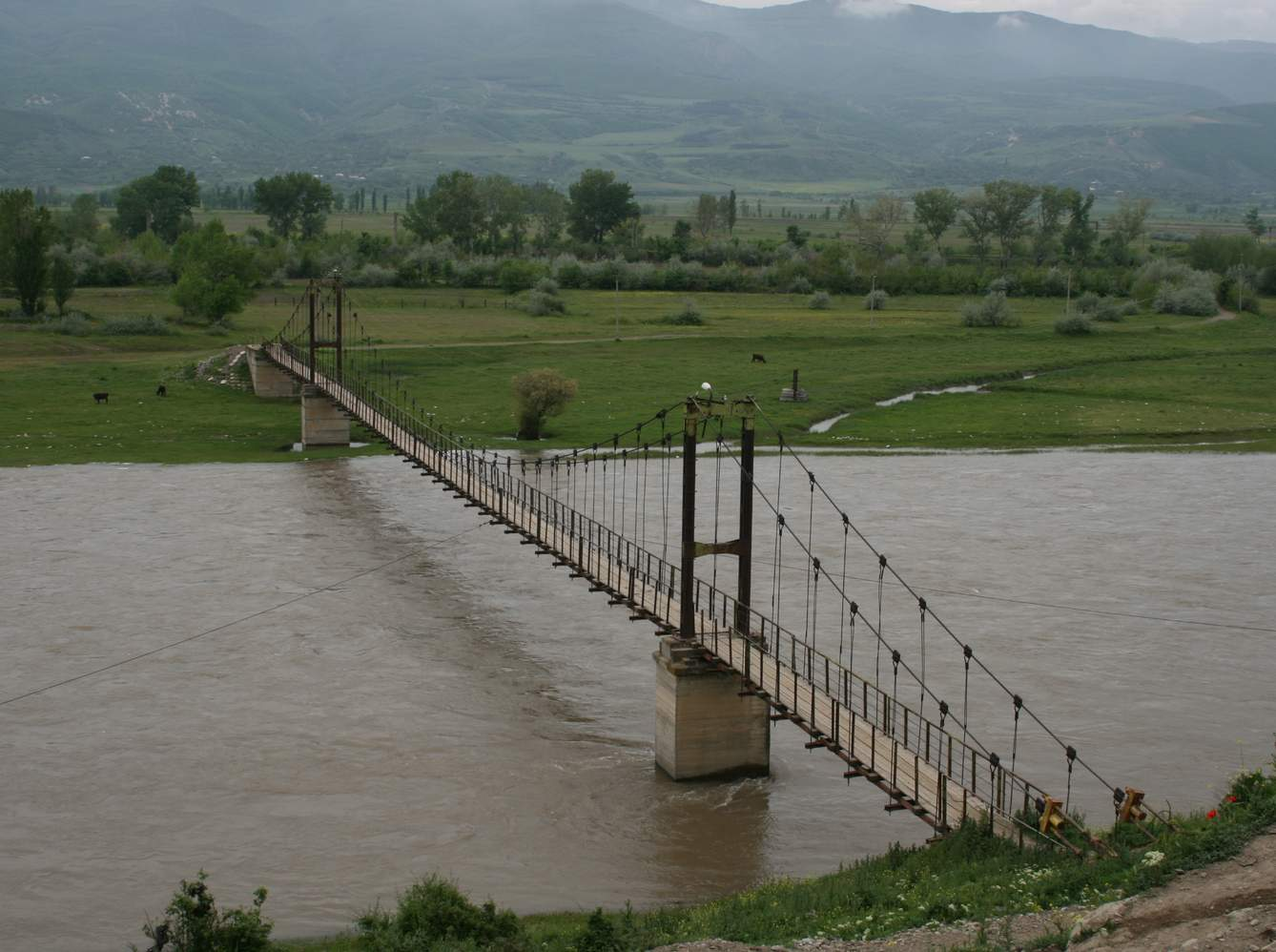
Bridge over the Mtkvari at Urbnisi

Kareli (Georgian: ქარელის მუნიციპალიტეტი, romanized: karelis munitsip'alit'et'i) is a district of Georgia, in the region of Shida Kartli. Some northern territories of the district are part of the self-proclaimed republic of South Ossetia and have not been under control of the Georgian government since 1992. Located in the central part of Georgia on the Shida Kartli plain. The municipality is bordered on the east by Gori, on the west by Khashuri, and on the south by Borjomi. Area of the municipality - 687.9 km2 Population - 41 316 people. There are 35 state public schools and 1 private school-gymnasium, a secondary vocational school, 1 central library, a cultural center and a museum of local lore in Kareli municipality.

== History ==
Kareli is mentioned in historical sources from the Early Bronze Age, and Kareli as a developed city center already in the XVI-XVII centuries. Mentioned. Most of today's Kareli was part of the Tsitsishvili nobility-Satsitsiano, where he lived and worked as a military-political, builder, cultural-educational, scientific and medical figure. Kareli is known for many historical facts: the Ecclesiastical Council of Ruisi-Urbnisi in 1103, Battle of Aradeti in 1483 and others.

The current territory of Kareli Municipality was included in Gori Mazra of Tbilisi Province until 1917. From 1930 in Gori and Khashuri districts, and from 1939 as a separate district. 1963-64 Rejoined these districts. From 1965 it was formed as a separate district within the present borders.

== Economy ==
In Kareli municipality there are mainly fields with investment potential: processing industry and agriculture. Agar sugar factory and food industry enterprises are located in Kareli municipality. The leading fields of agriculture are: fruit growing, horticulture, horticulture-horticulture, viticulture, animal husbandry and others. The main highway and highways of the Transcaucasian Railway pass here.

== Population ==
Kareli municipality includes one municipal center and 82 villages, which are united in 18 administrative units. The administrative center is Kareli, the administrative units are:

- Urbnisi
- Ruisi
- Agara
- Bebnisi
- Kekhijvari
- Khvedureti
- Akhalsopeli
- Mokhisi
- Dvani
- Zghuderi
- Bredza
- Ftsa
- Dirbi
- Breti
- Abisi
- Avlev
- Giganti

== Historic monuments ==
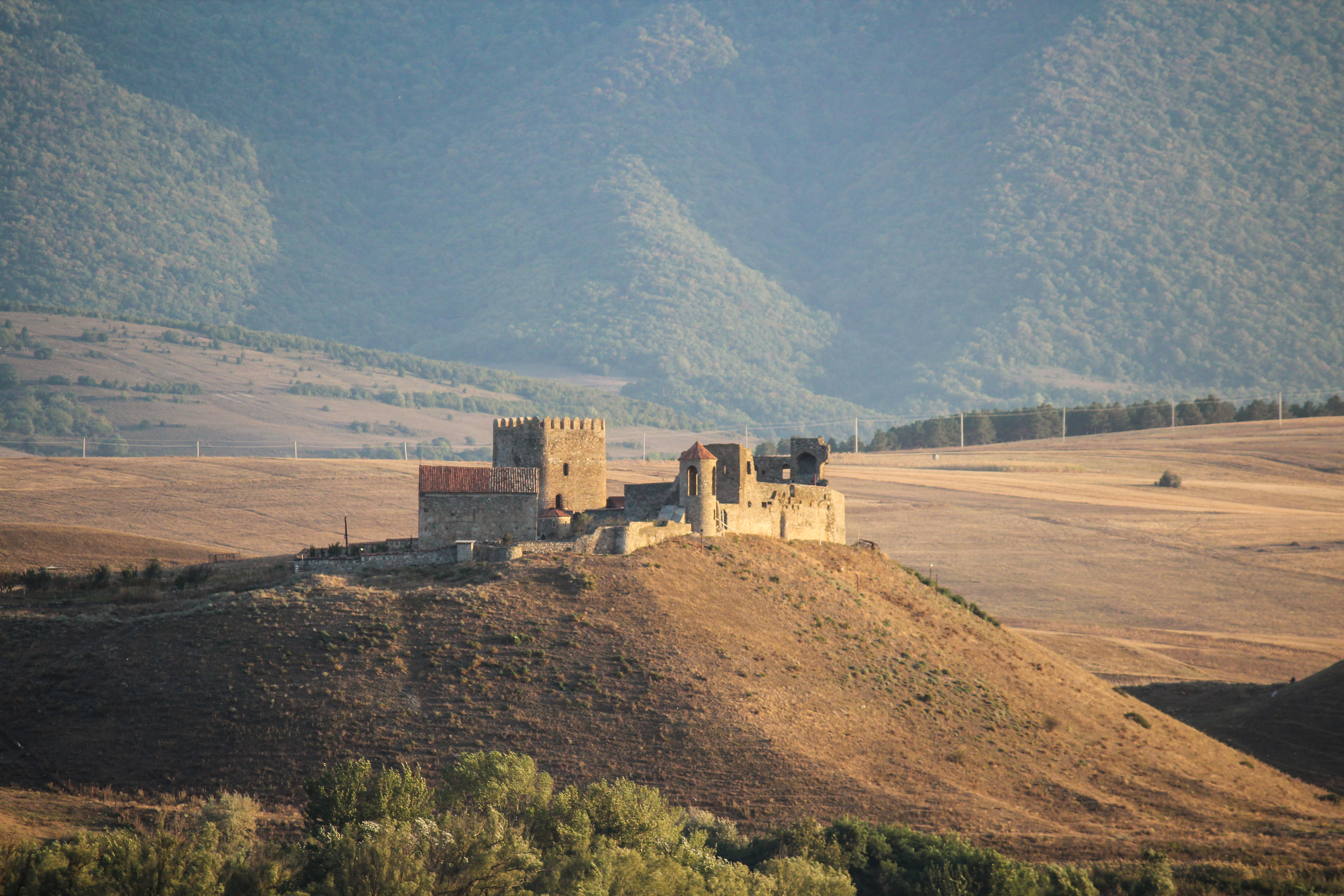
Samtsevrisi Castle

Important monuments of architecture and culture are located in Kareli:

- Mdzovreti Castle-Hall Complex
- Samtsevrisi church
- Kintsvisi Monastery
- Samtsevrisi Castle
- Kozifa Monastery
- Orkhevi Monastery
- Ortubani Monastery
- Dzadzvi Monastery
- historical villages Ruisi and Urbnisi.

Also, the natural lake of Bateti, which is 1313 m above sea level. In the gorge of the river Khvedurula there is a so-called red stone waterfall, Trekhvi boilers, where the Leonti Mroveli stone cross was found.

== Politics ==
Kareli Municipal Assembly (Georgian: ქარელის საკრებულო) is a representative body in Kareli Municipality. currently consisting of 27 members. The council is assembles into session regularly, to consider subject matters such as code changes, utilities, taxes, city budget, oversight of city government and more. Kareli sakrebulo is elected every four year. The last election was held in October 2021.

Party	2017	2021	Current Municipal Assembly
Georgian Dream	25	17	
United National Movement	4	8	
For Georgia		1	
Lelo		1	
European Georgia	1		
Alliance of Patriots	1		
Labour Party	1		
Free Georgia	1		
Total	33	27	

== See also ==
- List of municipalities in Georgia (country)
