= Shida Kartli =

Region of Georgia

Coordinates: 42°11′N 44°00′E

Shida Kartli შიდა ქართლი
- Mkhare (region)
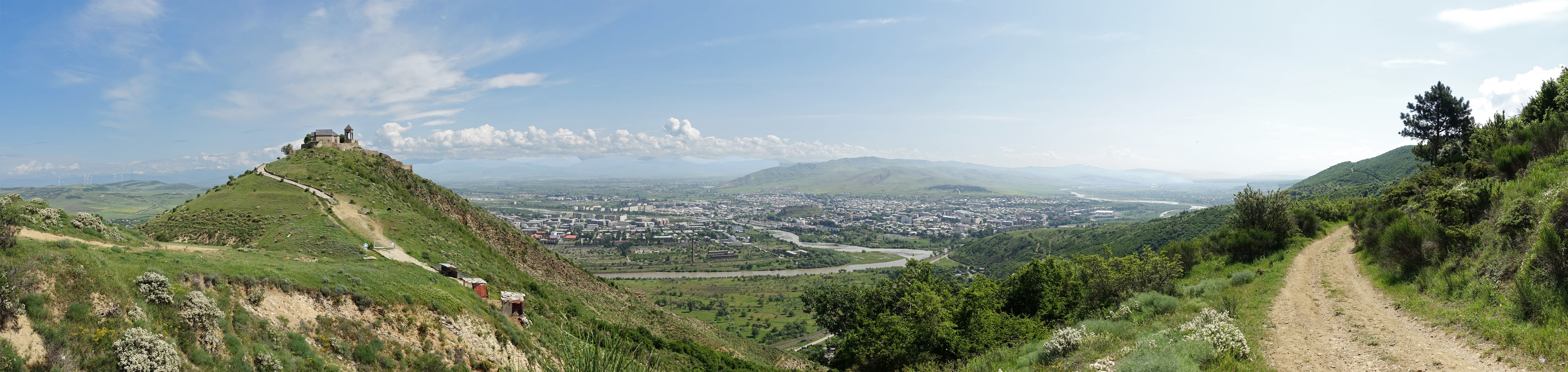
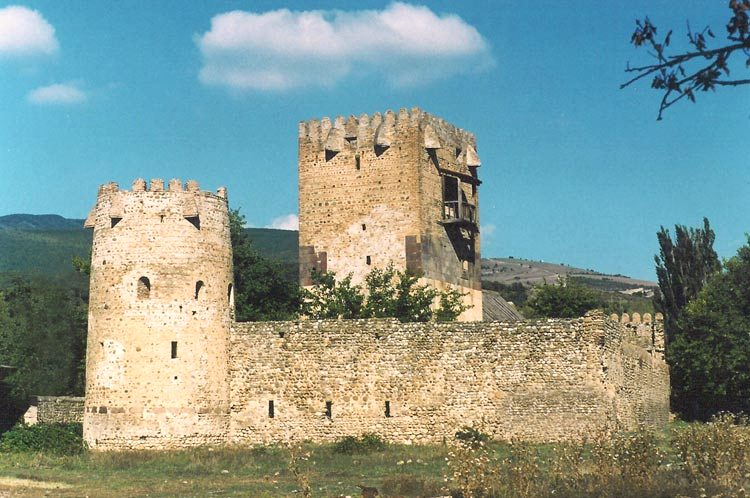
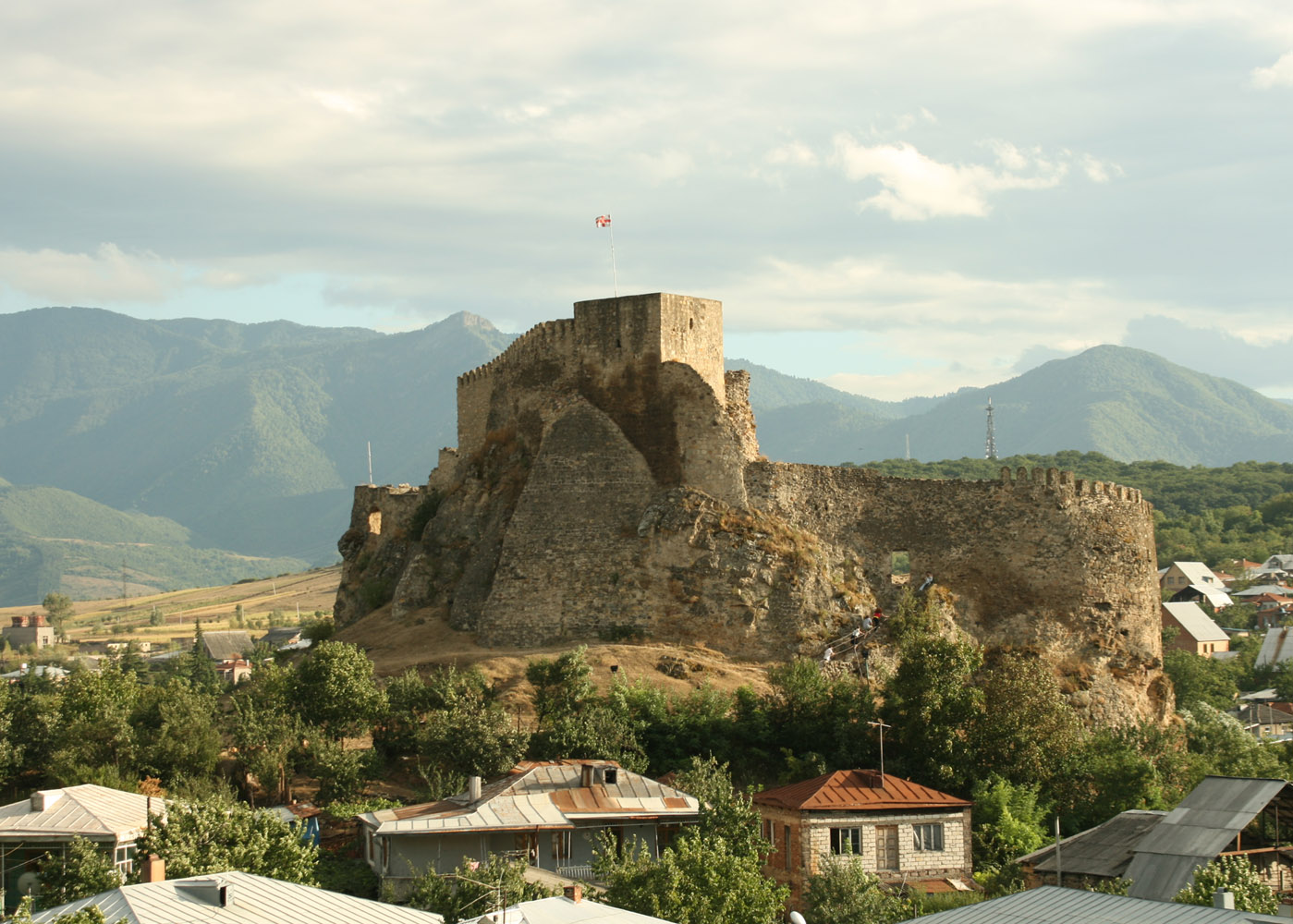
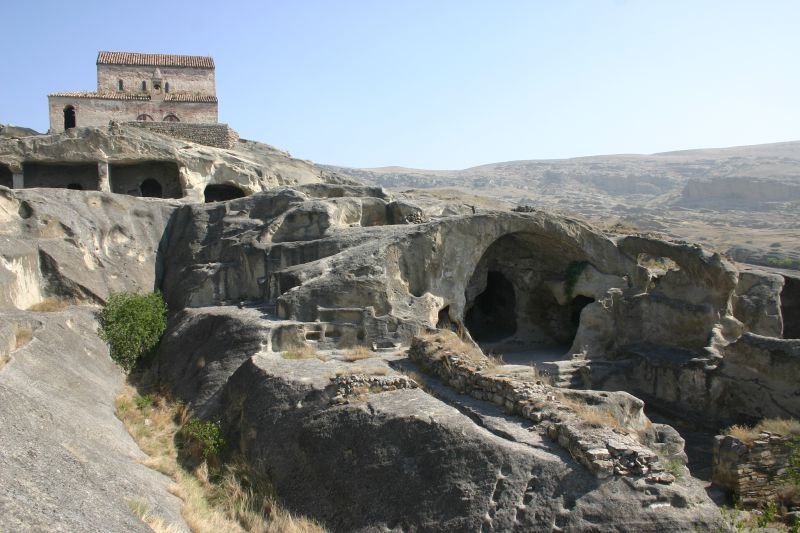
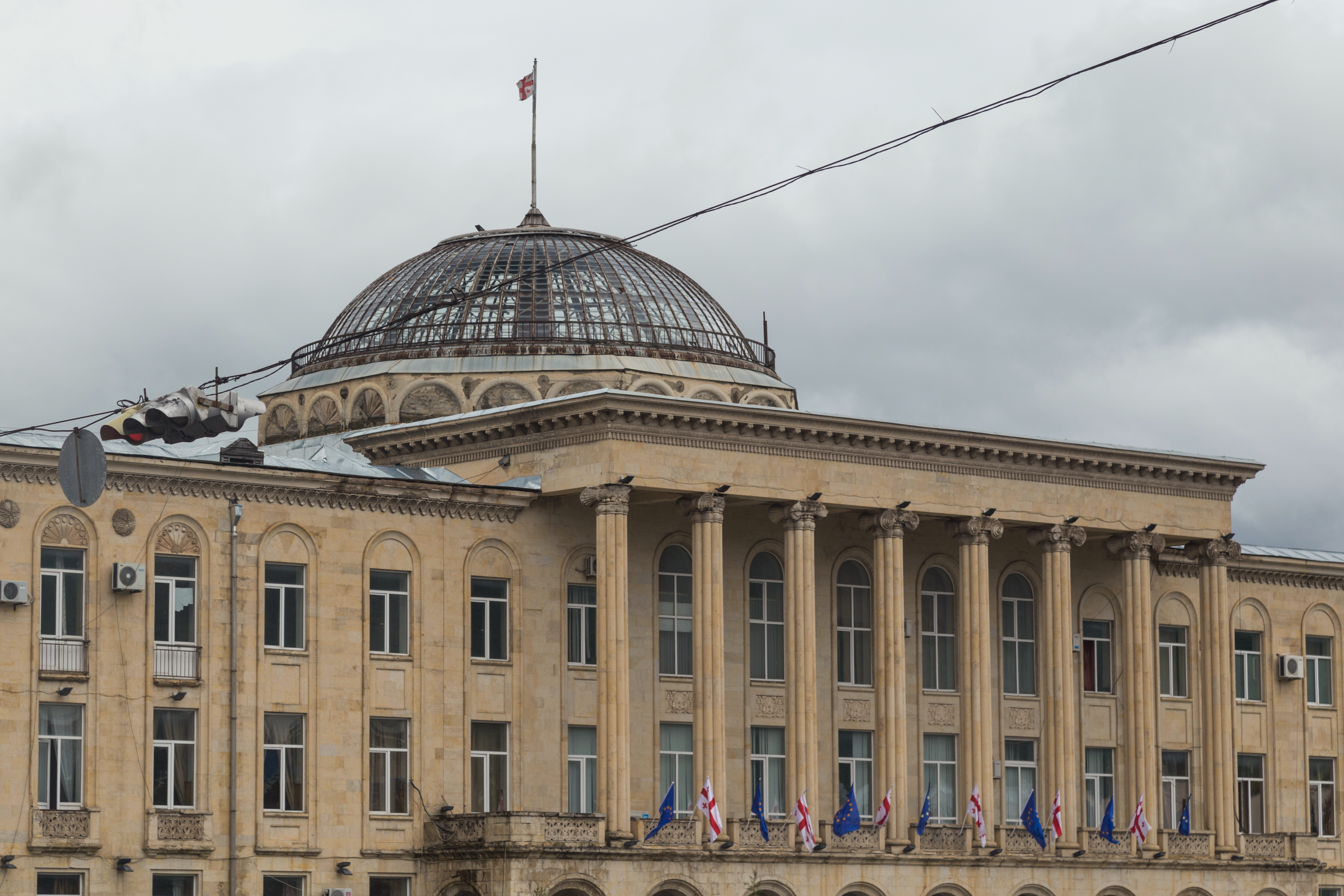
- From the top to bottom-right: Landscape of Inner Kartli, Amilakhvari Castle, Surami Fortress, Uplistsikhe, Gori City Hall.

- Overlapping borders of de jure Shida Kartli region and de facto South Ossetia (Note: South Ossetia's status is disputed. It considers itself to be an independent state, but this is recognised by only a few other countries. The Georgian government and most of the world's other states consider South Ossetia de jure a part of Georgia's territory.)
- Country: Georgia
- Seat: Gori
- Subdivisions: 5 municipalities

Government
  - Governor: Simon Guledani

Area
  - Total: 5,729 km^{2} (2,212 sq mi)

Population (2021)
  - Total: 254,081^{[a]}; (est. 284,081)
  - Density: 44.35/km^{2} (114.9/sq mi)

Gross Regional Product
  - Total: ₾ 2.5 billion (2022)
  - Per Capita: ₾ 10,002 (2022)
- Time zone: UTC+4 (Georgian Time)
- ISO 3166 code: GE-SK
- Climate: Dfb, Dfa, Cfa
- HDI (2023): 0.820 high · 6th
- Website: shidakartli.gov.ge/en

Shida Kartli (Georgian: შიდა ქართლი, IPA: [ʃida kʰaɾtʰli]; lit. 'Inner Kartli') is a landlocked administrative region (mkhare) in eastern Georgia. It comprises a central part of the historical-geographic province of Shida Kartli. With an area of 5,729 square kilometres (2,212 sq mi), Shida Kartli is the 8th largest Georgian region by land area. With 284,081 inhabitants, it is Georgia's seventh-most-populous region. Shida Kartli's capital and largest city, Gori, is the 5th largest city in Georgia.

The region is bordered by Russia to the north, Georgian regions of Mtskheta-Mtianeti to the east, Kvemo Kartli to the south, Samtskhe-Javakheti to the southwest, Imereti to the west, and Racha-Lechkhumi and Kvemo Svaneti to the northwest. It consists of the following municipalities: Gori, Kaspi, Kareli, Java, Khashuri.

The northern part of the region, namely Java, and northern territories of Kareli and Gori municipalities (total area of 1,393 km^{2}), have been controlled by the authorities of the self-proclaimed Republic of South Ossetia since 1992 and occupied by Russian troops since 2008 Russo-Georgian war.

== Etymology ==
The name Shida Kartli in English translates as Inner Kartli. The term Kartli itself derives from Proto-Kartvelian root *kart- ("Georgian"), which is considered an ancient inner-Kartvelian formation by modern linguists.

== Geography ==
Relief map of Shida Kartli

Shida Kartli is located in a central part of the lowland between Greater and Lesser Caucasus. To the north, Shida Kartli shares 27.5 km international border with Russian Federation. As of 2018, the Georgian government lacks control over it, hence the border is closed for international transit. To the east, the region shares an administrative border with Mtskheta-Mtianeti, to the south with Kvemo Kartli, to the southwest with Samtskhe-Javakheti, to the west with Imereti, and to the northwest with Racha-Lechkhumi and Kvemo Svaneti.

The region's northern border is formed by the Greater Caucasus mountains, the eastern border mainly goes along the Kharuli ridge and the Ksani River, the southern border goes along the Trialeti Range, and the western border is formed by the Likhi and Racha ranges.

=== Relief ===
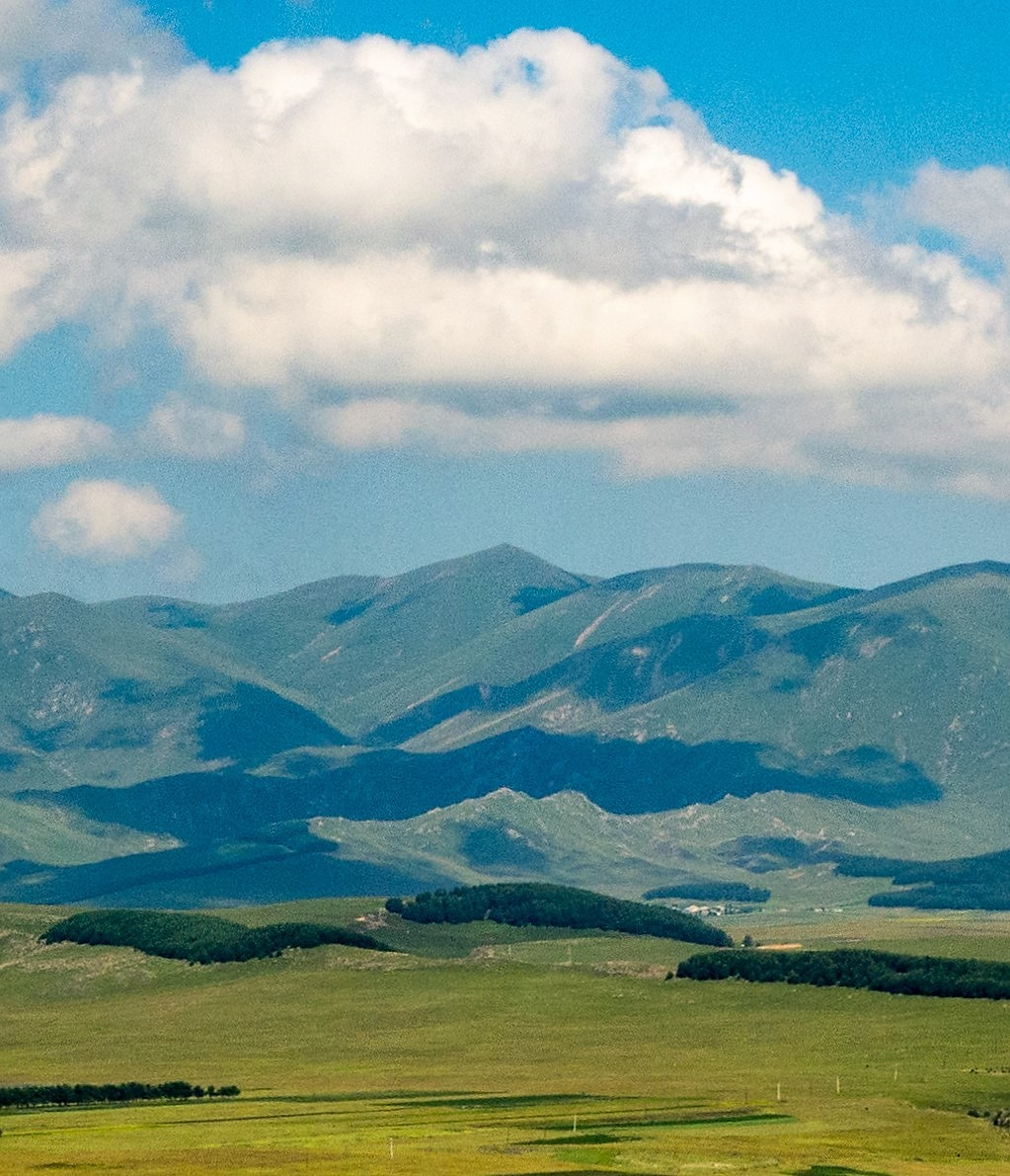
Mount Arjevani (2,757.7 metres (9,048 ft)) view from the village of Bareti, Kvemo Kartli

Overall picture of Shida Kartli's relief is formed by extensive Shida Kartli plain and mountainous edges. The main orographic entities of the region are: small parts of the Greater Caucasus mountains and Racha range, Germukhi, Kharuli, Kvernaki, Trialeti, Likhi ranges and Shida Kartli plain.

The average height of the Shida Kartli terrain is 1,307 meter. The lowest point is at 473 meter in Kaspi municipality, at the confluence of the Mtkvari and the Ksani rivers. The highest point is the mountain Laghztsiti (3,877.4 m) which is located in occupied part of Shida Kartli. On the Georgian controlled part of the region the highest point is the mountain Arjevani (2,757.7 m).

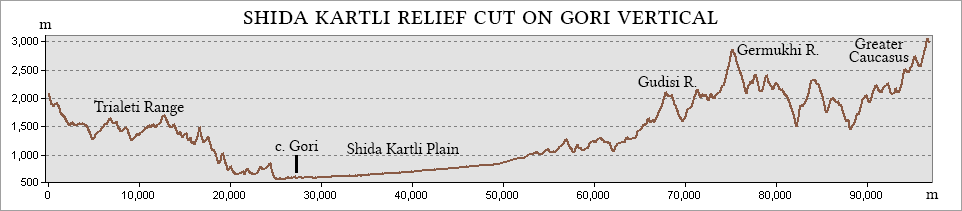
Shida Kartli relief profile on Gori vertical

=== Climate ===
Shida Kartli has various climate, in its central part, on the plain is represented moderate humid climate, with moderate cold winters and warm long summers. To the east from Gori environs, along Mtkvari valley (up to 600 m), is represented transient climate from dry subtropics to moderate humid subtropics, with moderate cold winters and hot summers. To the north of the plain on southern slopes of the Greater Caucasus mountains (1,100–1,900 m) and to the south on northern slopes of the Trialeti range (1,400–1,900 m) climate is moderate humid with cold winters and long summers and from 1,900 m to 2,600 m with cold winters and short summers. On southern slopes of the Greater Caucasus mountains from 2,600 m to 3,400 m is represented moderate humid climate of the highlands with lack of true Summer, and above 3,400 m – moderate humid climate of the highlands with permanent snow and glaciers. To the west of the region, on Likhi range above 900 m is distributed transient highlands climate from marine humid to continental humid. In the most north-western part of the region, on the western slopes of Likhi range and Racha range, a humid climate is represented with cold winters and short summers, and above 2,600 m there is a humid highland climate with a lack of true summer.

==== Temperature ====
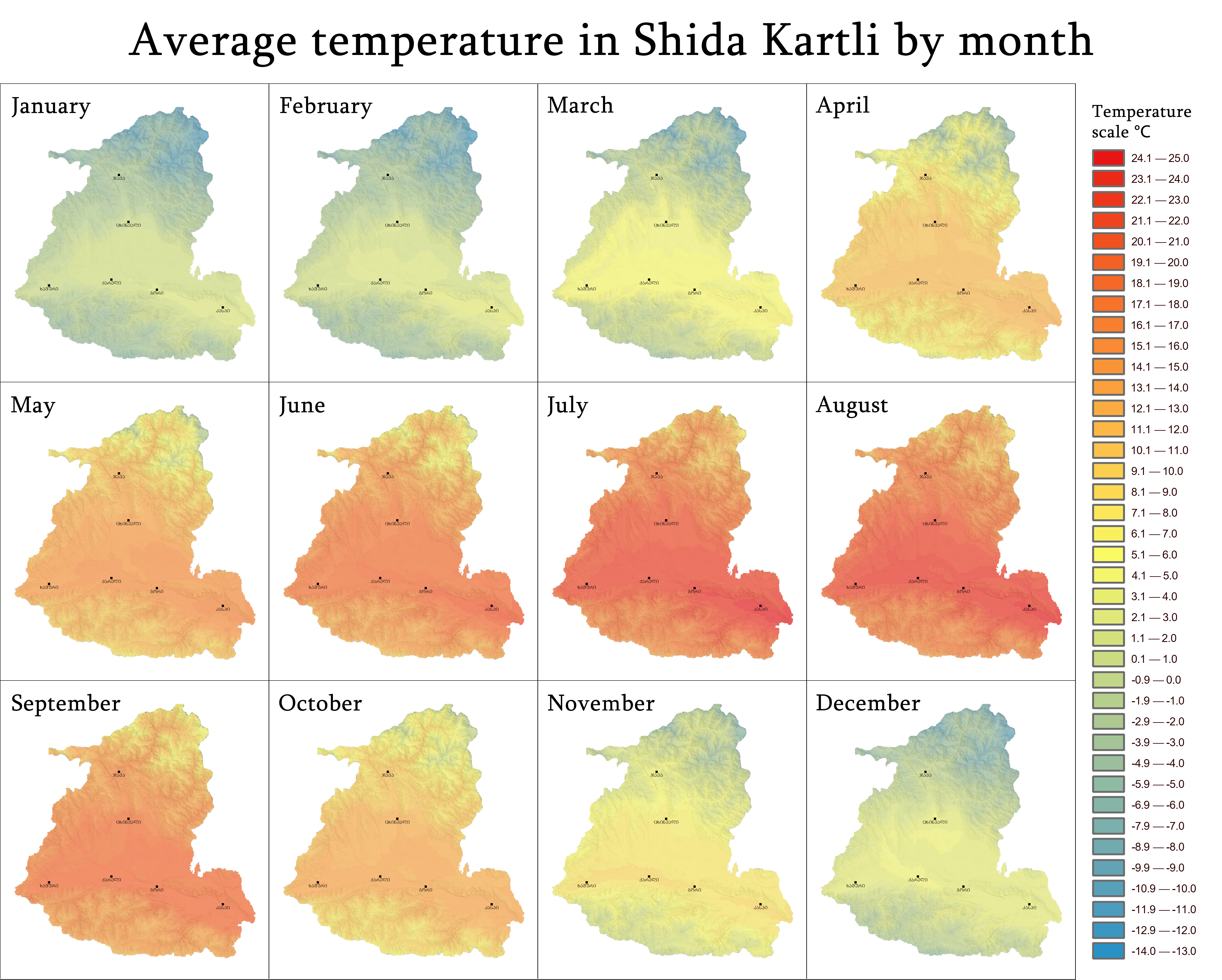
Average temperature in Shida Kartli by month

An average annual temperature of the region is 6.5 °C, maximum annual temperature of 12.2 °C is to the east of the Kaspi Municipality and minimum annual temperature of −5.0 °C is in the Java Municipality, on the Caucasus Mountains. The highest average annual temperature is on the Shida Kartli plain which rises from west to east from 9 °C to 12.2 °C. The hottest month of the region is August (18.5 °C) and its maximum average monthly temperature reaches 24.4 °C, while minimum – drops to 4.5 °C. The coldest month is January (-2,6 °C) and its minimum average monthly temperature drops to −12.6 °C, while maximum reaches – 1.6 °C.

==== Precipitation ====
On the territory of Shida Kartli an average annual precipitation equals to 824 mm. Maximum of a precipitation (1,045 mm) falls to the very north of the region, on the Caucasus Mountains, while the minimum (536 mm) falls to the east of Kaspi Municipality, along Mtkvari valley. By abundance of precipitation, the northern part of the region stand out: its amount varies from 800 mm up to 1,045 mm. On the Shida Kartli plain, average annual precipitation varies from 563 mm up to 800 mm, and on the Trialeti Range from 700 mm up to 900 mm.

By month, maximum average annual precipitation falls in May (109 mm) and June (105 mm), while the minimum falls in February (57 mm).

==== Winds ====
In Shida Kartli the strongest winds blow in December and January, their average speed reaching 2.49 m/s and 2.35 m/s respectively. The weakest winds are in October (1.83 m/s). In the region winds usually blow from the east or the west side.

By territorial distribution winds are especially strong on the southern slopes of the Greater Caucasus Mountains, while the weakest are on the Shida Kartli plain.

== See also ==
- Subdivisions of Georgia
- Kartli
- Samachablo
- 2008 Russo-Georgian war
- Russian-occupied territories in Georgia
