= Prince Demna of Georgia =

Georgian royal prince

Prince Demna
- Died: 1178
- Burial: Svetitskhoveli Cathedral
- Spouse: Daughter of Ivane II Orbeli
- Dynasty: Bagrationi
- Father: David V
- Religion: Georgian Orthodox Church

Demna (Georgian: დემნა, a hypocorism for Demetrius, დემეტრე; died 1178) was a Georgian royal prince and pretender to the throne proclaimed as king during the failed nobles’ revolt of 1177/8.

== Biography ==
Demna was the son of King David V, who in 1154 managed to overthrow his father, Demetrius I, made him a monk and sent him to the David Gareji monastery, while he ascended the throne. However, David V died suddenly six months after becoming king. According to Vardan Areveltsi, David was poisoned by Sumbat I and Ivane II Orbeli, with whom the Orbelis had made an agreement with Prince George, younger son of Demetrius I, that he would appoint them as Amirspasalars.

According to precedence and law, after David's death, his young son, Prince Demna should have inherited the throne. But Demetrius was restored to the throne, and he crowned his younger son, George, as co-ruler and retired to David Gareja monastery. Others allege that Demetrius had also died, and that George then seized the throne illicitly. According to the Armenian historian Stepanos Orbelian, gives his family's version of the events, which, unsurprisingly, exonerates them but still firmly condemns George. Stepanos denies any family involvement in the murder of David V and says that George had sworn to David V that he would rule only until Demna reached his majority, but then reneged on his vow.

The rebellion led by Ivane Orbeli broke out in 1177. The insurgents crowned Demna the king at the Agara Castle and marched, with 30,000 men, to the Georgian capital of Tbilisi. However, Orbeli’s plan of a surprise attack failed. George III relied mainly on crack troops provided by the Kipchak mercenaries and Caucasian mountaineers. By force and diplomacy, he induced many of the rebel nobles to surrender. Orbeli, however, refused to comply and retired to the Lore fortress (now Lori, Armenia). The royal army quickly overran the fiefdoms of rebel lords and put Lore under siege. Orbeli requested aid from the neighbouring Seljuk rulers but his forces completely exhausted before the reinforcements could arrive. Demna was the first to surrender. Throwing himself and his followers on the mercy of his uncle, he was blinded and castrated to ensure the primacy of George’s branch of the family, and the Orbelis were extirpated and their lands and wealth seized. Imprisoned, Demna did not survive the punishment and soon died.

The Georgian female poet Tamar Eristavi proposed, in 1988, a romantic though unreliable and otherwise unproved hypothesis identifying Prince Demna with the famous Georgian poet Shota Rustaveli, who was allegedly in love with Demna's cousin, Princess Tamar; he survived the repressions and wrote his poem The Knight in the Panther's Skin (dedicated to Tamar) in exile under the assumed identity of Rustaveli.

== Bibliography ==
- Eastmond, Antony (1998). Royal Imagery in Medieval Georgia. University Park: Pennsylvania State Press. ISBN 0-271-01628-0.
- Lordkipanidze, M. (1978). "დემნა (დემეტრე) უფლისწული". Georgian Soviet Encyclopedia. Vol. 3. Tbilisi. p. 461.
- Rayfield, Donald (2012). Edge of Empires, a History of Georgia. London: Reaktion Books. ISBN 978-1-78023-070-2.
