= Battle of Didgori =

Part of the Georgian–Seljuk wars in 1121

- Part of the Georgian–Seljuk wars
Date	August 12, 1121
Location	Didgori valley, Kingdom of Georgia (present-day Didgori, Georgia) 41°41′N 44°31′E
Result	Georgian victory

Belligerents
Seljuk Empire; Artuqids; Beylik of Dilmaç; Banu Mazyad; Shaddadids; Emirate of Tbilisi; Sultanate of Rum	Kingdom of Georgia: Alans; Kipchaks; Armenians; and Frankish mercenaries

Commanders and leaders
Ilghazi (WIA); Tughril II; Dubays ibn Sadaqa	David IV; Demetrius I

Strength
Modern estimates: Several times larger; 100,000–250,000 (Georgian sources); Medieval Christian sources: 150,000, 400,000, 600,000 or 800,000; Medieval Arab sources: 30,000	Total: 55,600 (Georgian sources): 40,000 Georgians Including 5,000 Monaspa; 15,000 Kipchaks; 500 Alan mercenaries; 100–500 Frankish knights; Unknown number of Armenian and Shirvanese forces

Casualties and losses
Christian sources: 400,000 killed, 30,000 captured (Matthew of Edessa); 400,000 killed, 50,000 captured (Smbat Sparapet); Turkish sources: Tens of thousands dead, 4,000 captured (Ali Sevim)	Unknown
- Location of Didgori valley in Georgia with present-day administrative borders.

The Battle of Didgori (Georgian: დიდგორის ბრძოლა, romanized: didgoris brdzola) was fought between the armies of the Kingdom of Georgia and the Seljuk Empire at the narrow place of Didgori, 40 km west of Tbilisi, on August 12, 1121. The large Muslim army, under the command of Ilghazi, was unable to maneuver and suffered a devastating defeat due to King David IV's effective military tactics.

The battle at Didgori was the culmination of the entire Georgian–Seljuk wars and led to the Georgians' reconquest of Tbilisi in 1122. Soon after that David moved the capital from Kutaisi to Tbilisi. The victory at Didgori inaugurated the medieval Georgian Golden Age and is celebrated in The Georgian Chronicles as a (Georgian: ძლევაჲ საკვირველი dzlevay sak'virveli lit. 'miraculous victory'). Modern Georgians continue to remember the event as an annual August 12 festival known as Didgoroba ('[the day] of Didgori').

== Deployment and order of battle ==
=== Muslim coalition ===
Both Georgian and Islamic sources testify that on the complaints of the Muslim merchants of Tbilisi, Ganja and Dmanisi, Sultan Mahmud II of Baghdad (r. 1118–1131) sent an expedition into Georgia under command of Ilghazi ibn Artuq of Mardin, whose hegemony in the Middle East and authority among the Muslims was indisputable. After pillaging the County of Edessa and defeat of Roger of Antioch at the battle of Ager Sanguinis in 1119, the reputation of Ilghazi as a great military commander and champion of Muslims against Christians spread far and wide.

After this victory, Ilghazi made a truce with the Crusaders and went north towards Armenia at the invitation of the sultan's brother Toghrul, ruler of Arran. There he joined a Muslim coalition against Christian Georgians and led the coalition's army, in which his vassal Tughan-Arslan lord of Arzen, Bidlis and Dvin, the Mazyadid Dubays ibn Sadaqa of Al Hillah, Toghrul and Nakhichevan, with his atabeg Kun-Toghdi, all took part.

According to historian Alexander Mikaberidze, "The size of the Muslim army is still a matter of debate, with numbers ranging from a fantastic 600,000 men (as given by Walter the Chancellor and Matthew of Edessa) to 400,000 (Sempad Sparapet's Chronicle), while estimates of modern Georgian historians vary between 100,000 and 250,000 men. Although the higher numbers are exaggerated, all sources indicate that the Muslims made massive preparations. In mid-summer 1121, the Muslim troops advanced along various routes, with part of them passing the provinces of Erzerum and Kars, while Sultan Toghrul ibn Muhammad moved through Ganja and Tughan-Arslan the "Hunchback" marched from Dvin."

According to Matthew of Edessa, the Muslim coalition numbered 560,000 men in total, led by Ilghazi with his vassal Tughan-Arslan, and with support from nomadic Arab tribes.

As the Georgian king was well aware of the coalition's plans, he decided to exclude one of the coalition leaders. In the first half of 1121, the Georgians twice attacked the Seljuks in the territory of the Emirate of Ganja and massacred them. As a consequence, the ruler of Arran was no longer able to participate in the campaign.

Ilghazi was aware of the defeat of his main ally, but he continued his march. In July 1121, the army of Ilghazi entered Georgian territory. According to Al-Fāriqī, Ilghazi selected the route from Kars to Javakheti and Trialeti to reach Tbilisi, where he could camp, rest, and then act against the Georgians. The Muslim army under the overall command of Ilghazi entered the valley of Trialeti in eastern Georgia and encamped in the vicinities of Didgori and Manglisi in 10 August 1121, about a day's march from Tbilisi.

Little is known of Ilghazi's exact battle plan or course of action and order of battle other than the commonly suggested deployment of large numbers of light missile troops, particularly archers and light cavalry in the vanguard to harass the enemy lines while the bulk of the army remained behind them in orderly battle formation. It is suggested that Ilghazi's vanguard approached David's army and reported back about a much smaller force than expected, which might have raised Ilghazi's confidence enough to not expect any surprise. It is also claimed that the Seljuq light cavalry rode in front of the Georgians and started to shoot and taunt them which was received with little to no effect on their morale. There is no evidence of heavy cavalry present on Ilghazi's side or any type of cavalry which could have matched the Georgian counterpart.

=== Georgian army ===
On the other side, the Georgians were facing a significantly superior foe in terms of numbers, but had the strategic as well as tactical advantage. The Georgians were well aware of the Muslim preparations and took necessary precautions. In 1118, after successful completion of David IV's military reform, a royal guard and a household force known as mona-spa, a royal servant host made up of mercenaries and lower nobility was formed. The Georgian army of 56,000 men included 500 Alans, about 200 Franks, and 15,000 Kipchaks.

The smallest formations would be equivalents of today's platoons "group of 20" (ოცეული), then a "group of 100" (ასეული) and so forth all led by servants of higher status and different rank. The core component of David's army was the so-called mona-spa, or servant host, the personal retinue of the king, which consisted of 5,000 well-trained and heavily armored mounted warriors with lances and bows. They were used as shock cavalry together with the nobility. The Crusaders, the Kipchak cavalry, and a small portion of infantry were deployed in the center of the Georgian army around the king's banner while the rest were equally split in two major wings initially out of sight for the Seljuqs. Each formation was headed by a great and dense line of horsemen. The heavy cavalry would smash into the enemy ranks with their lances, joined by the infantry which would entangle the Seljuq main body in fights while the cavalry was to regroup and carry out repeated attacks till the enemy broke. At the sign of collapse, David would then send forward his Kipchak cavalry. Initially the king and all his entourage stayed in the center but would immediately switch to their respective positions when the battle commenced. During battle, David IV would assume command over his army's left wing, while Demetrius was leading the right.

According to the French knight and historian Walter the Chancellor, before heading off to battle, King David inspired his army with these words:

Soldiers of Christ! If we fight bravely for our Faith, we will defeat not only the devil’s servants, but the devil himself. We will gain the greatest weapon of spiritual warfare when we make a covenant with the Almighty God and vow that we would rather die for His love than escape from the enemy. And if any one of us should wish to retreat, let us take branches and block the entrance to the gorge to prevent this. When the enemy approaches, let us attack fiercely!

==== Kipchaks ====
Georgian relations with Cumans-Kipchaks seem to have been generally peaceful. Moreover, the Georgian politicians of that time saw the Kipchaks as potential allies against the Seljuk conquests. According to Georgian chronicles, Georgians knew about the Kipchaks' good fighting skills, their bravery, and the enormous human resources that they had." After the victories of the Rus' Grand Prince Vladimir II Monomakh in 1109, 40,000 Kipchaks commanded by Otrok Khan, known in Georgia as Atrak'a, son of Sharagan (i.e. Sharukan), fled to Georgia, received baptism, and entered the service of the Georgian king David IV. The Georgian-Kipchak alliance was facilitated by David's earlier marriage to the Khan's daughter, who received the name Gurandukht. Kipchaks were outfitted by the crown and were granted lands to settle. In turn, the Kipchaks provided one soldier per family, allowing King David to establish a standing army in addition to his royal troops.

==== Franks ====
The participation of Frankish soldiers in the battle of Didgori is reported in two sources: one by a 12th-century Armenian historian, Matthew of Edessa, who mentions 100 Franks, and the other by Walter the Chancellor, according to whom David used 200 Frankish soldiers deployed ahead of his armies as a striking force against the enemy.

There is no exact information whether they were auxiliary troops sent by the prince of Antioch or king Baldwin II of Jerusalem, or simply mercenaries. However, as both Franks and Georgians had one common enemy, the Muslims, it can be argued that the Frank soldiers were allies rather than mercenaries. It's supposed that Crusaders arrived to Georgia through Constantinople because the territory between Antioch and Georgia was occupied by the Seljuks.

Battle of Didgori Mouseover for name.
Blue circle=Capital
Red dot=Muslim held cities and fortresses
Black dot=regions within Kingdom of Georgia
X=Major battle

== Battle ==
King David could not allow Ilghazi to unite with the Tbilisi Muslims, so he made the decision to intercept him on his way there. He used a strategy of surprise and to entice the enemy step-by-step into a trap. He chose a mountainous and wooded area near the Didgori Mountain range, situated between Manglisi and Tbilisi, to attack. "On August 11, 1121, King David led his army along the Nichbisi valley from the ancient capital of Mtskheta and divided his troops into two parts, one under his personal command and the other smaller group under his son Demetrius I, hidden in reserve behind the nearby heights with orders to attack the flank at a given signal."

The course of the battle is differently related in the contemporary historical records. According to the Arab chronicler Ibn al-Athir, David sent a small Kipchak detachment of his men in order to simulate negotiation. The Muslims thought that the small detachment had left the Georgian army seeking protection, so the Muslims did not regard them as a threat. Meanwhile, the Georgians successfully managed to deploy a large portion of their force where they would almost encircle the enemy in a pincer movement. Their opponents remained unaware of such activities. Upon approaching the Seljuq leaders, the deserters, using the self-confidence of the Muslims to their advantage, attacked them with arrows, killing every Seljuq commander in sight and others who were attending the meeting.

While this was going on, David ordered a frontal attack on the enemy vanguard with his crusader knights which not only devastated the enemy's forward lines, but also entangled the Seljuq archers in close combat, effectively taking out a crucial component of Ilghazi's force. This trick resulted in chaos and panic among the Muslims. The Georgians then began to quickly advance on the flanks from the western side of the mountain in full formation. Ilghazi and his son-in-law both survived the attack on the vanguard, but were severely injured during the fight and withdrew from the battlefield, leaving the Seljuq army virtually leaderless.

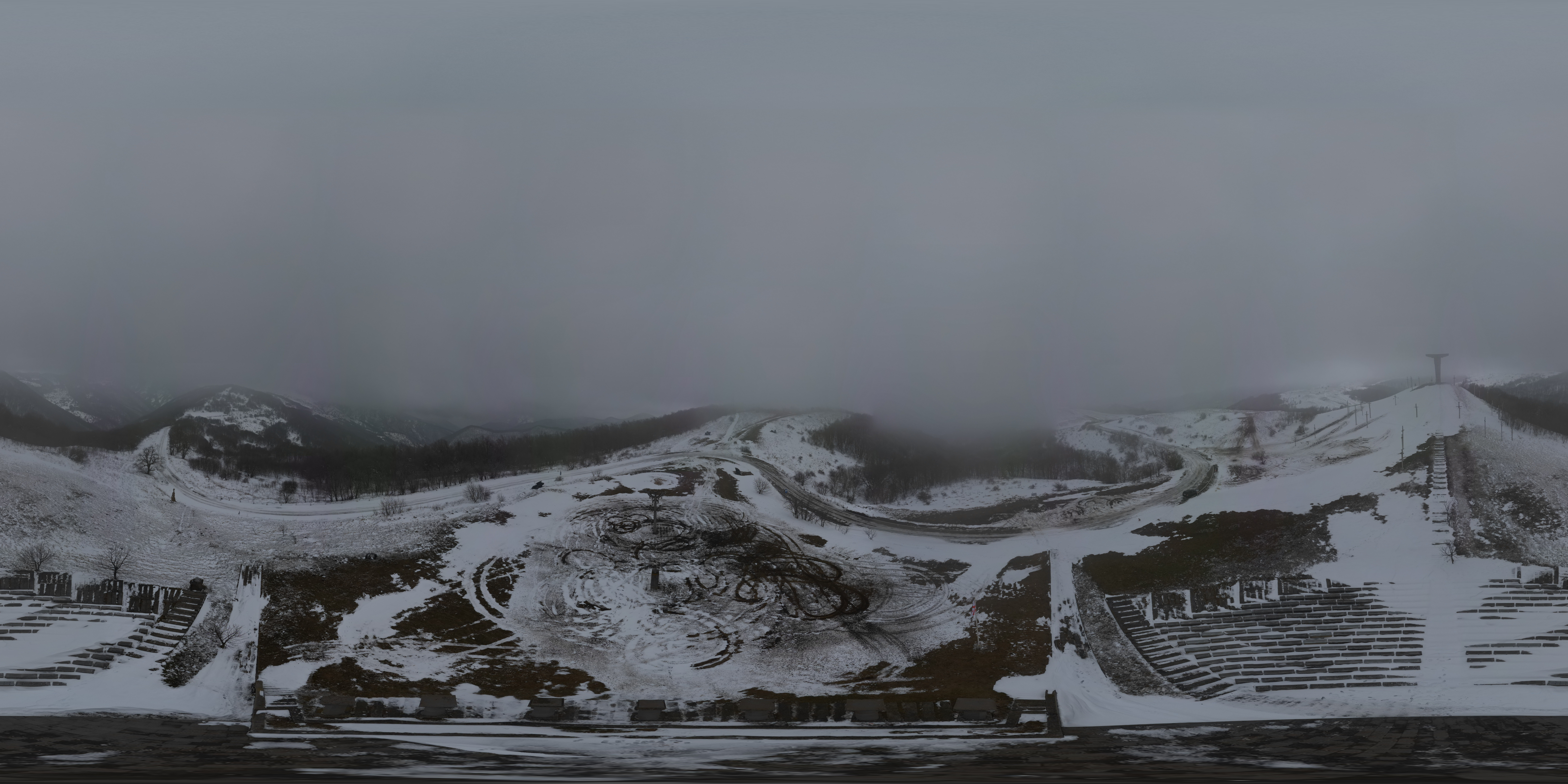
Aerial panorama of the Didgori monument in winter.

The majority of his commanders were either injured or killed, which caused confusion and probably resulted in a lack of adequate response to the chaotic situation. King David didn't hesitate and personally led the Georgian right flank, ordering his heavy cavalry to ride straight into the seemingly disorganized Seljuk left flank, which was trying to reinforce the vanguard. Having the advantage of moving downhill, the charge of the Georgian cavalry proved very effective.

Almost simultaneously the left wing, under the command of David's son Demetrius, struck the Seljuk right flank also with heavy cavalry. When the Georgian infantry joined the fight, the Seljuq troops started to panic and retreated en masse through the huge gap in their army's rearguard, which wasn't engaged in the battle. This provoked large numbers of uninvolved Seljuq troops to flee as well, causing a massive rout, while their vanguard was completely annihilated. According to a Georgian chronicler, King David's troops pursued them for three days “putting all of them to the sword and leaving them to the carnivorous beasts and birds of the mountains and plains” of the Manglisi Valley.

Terrible and savage slaughter of the enemy troops ensued and the [enemy] corpses filled up the rivers and covered all valleys and cliffs.

— Matthew of Edessa

With the Kipchaks joining in, the final remnants of Seljuq resistance crumbled and joined the rout. The battle was decided within three hours with the Seljuq army overrun, leaving a vast number of dead, injured, prisoners, and booty. Fleeing remnants were constantly pursued and run down for several days so that they wouldn't have time or opportunity to regroup or commence any other move.

Aside from those accounts, it has also been suggested that confronted by a vanguard of the large invading force, David had to rely on the advantages the nearby terrain offered to disguise his troop movements. The Seljuk cavalry was provoked or tricked into a relatively narrow pass where they probably had not much room to maneuver. As these were cut off from the rest of Ilghazi's army, the Georgians were easily able to take them out with spears, pikes, and light infantry using bows and javelins. The rest of the coalition army was probably forced to climb slopes to attack the Georgian army's main body, while being constantly struck at the flanks by heavy cavalry. After a while, those tactics broke the fighting will of the Muslim army, which was soon routed. Ilghazi reportedly received an injury to his head when a hundred crusaders managed to break through his lines, rushing towards the Seljuq command banner.

== Aftermath ==
The numbers of Seljuks fleeing the field was reportedly so large that the Georgian cavalry was taking scores of prisoners for several days. As a result, the Georgians were able to liberate the entire region from Muslim influence and even contest territories within the Seljuq Empire, which at that point was left almost defenceless. The captured Seljuqs would serve for David's ambitions to rebuild his kingdom.

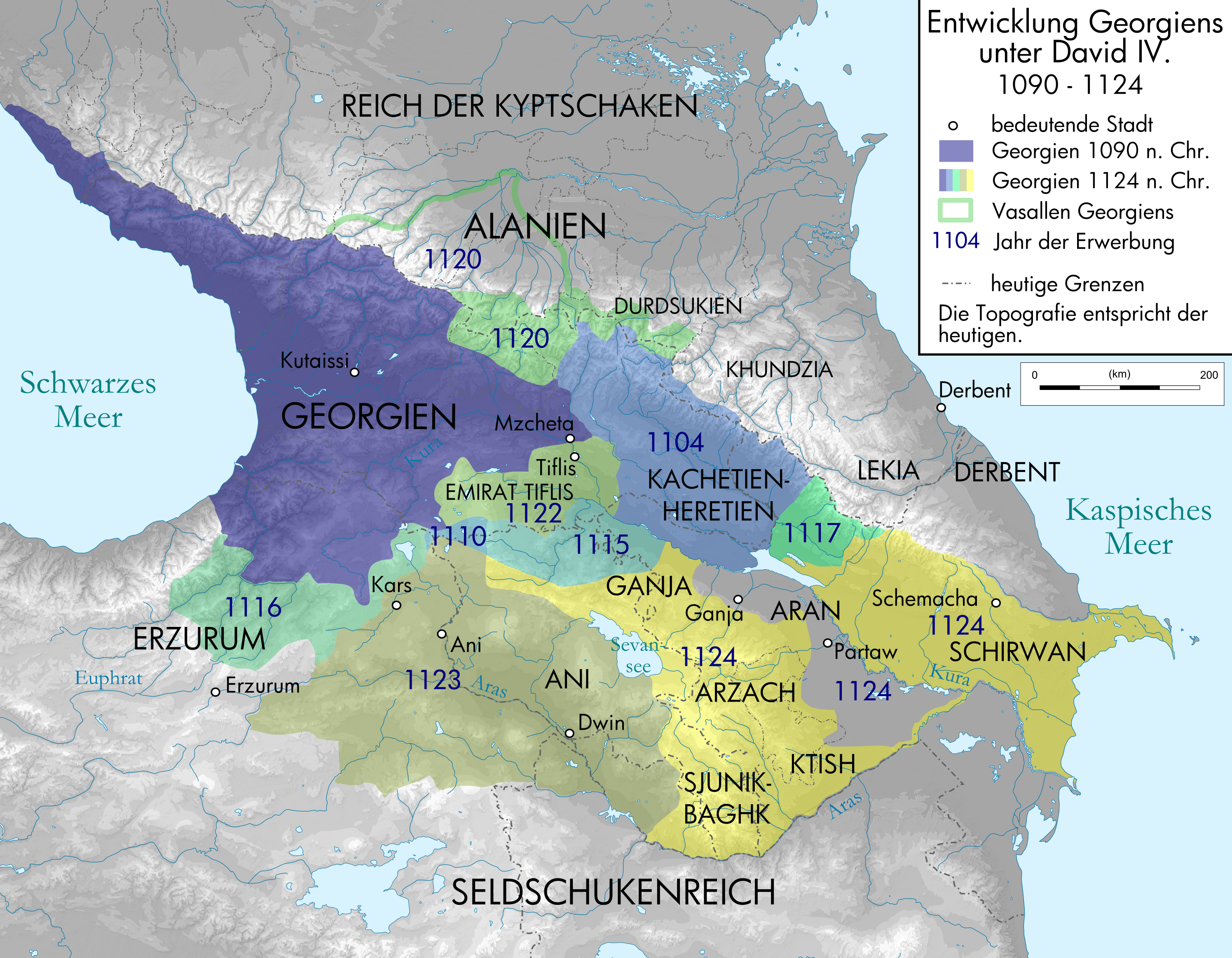
Expansion of Kingdom of Georgia under David IV's reign.

The unification of Georgia and the elimination of Muslim authority was completed in the year following the battle at Didgori. David laid siege to and captured the city of Tbilisi, which became the capital of Georgia.

The medieval sources emphasize David's acts of revenge against the Muslims of Tbilisi. However, the Arab historian al-'Ayni (1360–1451), who utilizes sources, some of which have not survived, admits that the city was pillaged but says that the Georgian king eventually showed patience and "respected the feelings of the Muslims." A well-educated man, he preached tolerance of other religions, abrogated taxes and services for the Muslims and Jews, and protected the Sufis and Muslim scholars.

Having his forces exhausted and being wounded himself, Ilghazi returned to Mardin in a devastated condition. The Didgori battle helped the Crusader states, which had been under the pressure of Ilghazi's armies. The weakening of the main enemy of the Latin principalities was beneficial for the Kingdom of Jerusalem under King Baldwin II.

According to A. Mikaberidze, "The triumphant victory at Didgori captured the imagination of future Georgian generations. A contemporary chronicler marveled, “What tongue can relate the wonders which our sustaining Christ gave us on that day? And what are the narrations of Homer and Aristotle to me about the Trojan War and the bravery of Achilles or Josephus’ writings about the valor of the Maccabees or Alexander and Titus at Jerusalem?” The battle entered Georgian national consciences as a “miraculous victory” (ძლევაჲ საკვირველი) and is without doubt one of the apogees of Georgian history. It signaled the emergence of Georgia as a military power in the late 11–12th centuries and shifted the balance scales in favor of Georgian cultural as well as political supremacy in eastern Asia Minor."

== Bibliography ==
- Mikaberidze, Alexander (May 14, 2008). "'Miraculous Victory:' Battle of Didgori, 1121". Armchair General.
- Fähnrich, Heinz (1994). "Die Schlacht am Didgori". Georgica (in German). 17: 33–39.
- Toria, Malkhaz; Javakhia, Bejan (2021). "Representing fateful events and imagining territorial integrity in Georgia: cultural memory of David the Builder and the Battle of Didgori". Caucasus Survey. 9 (3): 270–285. doi:10.1080/23761199.2021.1970914. S2CID 238993015.
- Mikaberidze, Alexander (2015). Historical Dictionary of Georgia. Rowman & Littlefield Publishers. ISBN 9781442241466.
