= Vakhtang (son of David IV) =

Vakhtang (Georgian: ვახტანგ) or Tsuata (Georgian: ცუატა; 1118 – 1138) was a Georgian royal prince (batonishvili) of the Bagrationi dynasty. He was the son of King David IV the Builder and the Cuman-Kipchak princess Gurandukht, daughter of Khan Otrok. Vakhtang was involved in an attempted coup against Demetrius I of Georgia, his half-brother and heir apparent. Vakhtang was captured, blinded and cast in prison where he apparently died shortly afterwards.

== Biography ==
The 12th-century document The Will of King David contains a vague and controversial passage whereby David instructs the eldest son and heir apparent Demetrius I to rear his younger brother Vakhtang and make him a successor to the throne if the latter proves to be "capable". Given the Georgian order of succession based on primogeniture and indication that an attempted coup against Demetrius in the 1130s involved Vakhtang, many modern scholars in Georgia consider the passage to be a latter-day forgery by Vakhtang's sympathizers. A reference to the aristocratic plot against Demetrius on behalf of Vakhtang is found in the contemporaneous Armenian chronicle by Vardan although the author does not directly names the rebellious prince. This plot, intended to assassinate Demetrius I, was directed by the influential nobleman Ivane Abuletisdze and his son Kirkish. The king was timely warned by Ivane's father Abulet. Vakhtang was captured, blinded and cast in prison where he apparently died shortly afterwards.

== Ancestry ==
Ancestors of Vakhtang

16. George I of Georgia
8. Bagrat IV of Georgia
17. Mariam of Vaspurakan
4. George II of Georgia
9. Borena of Alania
2. David IV of Georgia
5. Elene
1. Vakhtang
3. Guarandukht of the Kipchaks
