= Princess Bagrationi of Kiev =

Georgian princess

Princess Bagrationi was a 12th–13th century princess from Abkhazia, who was briefly grand princess consort of Kiev for a few months in 1154 by marriage to Iziaslav II of Kiev.

== Biography ==
The marriage of the Abkhaz princess to Iziaslav II of Kiev in 1154, as preserved in the Hypatian Codex copy of the Kievan Chronicle.

The princess is primarily known from an entry in the Kievan Chronicle under the year of 1154, in which she married the grand prince of Kiev:

In the year 1154, Izjaslav again sent his son Mstislav to meet his stepmother, for he was taking a wife, a daughter of the (Greek) tsar, for himself from Obez; and he (Mstislav) met her at the waterfalls and brought her to Kiev (to Izjaslav), and he himself went to Perejaslavl'. Izjaslav took her to him as his wife and had a wedding.

— Kievan Chronicle, translated by Lisa Lynn Heinrich (1977)

"Obez" means Abkhazia. Based on this fact, it has been conjectured that she was a Georgian princess of the royal Bagrationi dynasty. She would have been a daughter of King Demetrius I of Georgia, sister of the kings David V and George III and Princess Rusudan. She was a paternal aunt of the famous Queen Tamar of Georgia. Her first name is unknown, and nothing is known about her later life either.

== Bibliography ==
=== Primary sources ===
- Kievan Chronicle (c. 1200), sub anno 1158
  - (Church Slavonic critical edition) Shakhmatov, Aleksey Aleksandrovich, ed. (1908). Ipat'evskaya letopis' Ипатьевская лѣтопись [The Hypatian Codex]. Complete Collection of Russian Chronicles (PSRL) (in Church Slavic). Vol. 2 (3rd ed.). Saint Petersburg: Typography of M. A. Aleksandrov / Izbornyk. pp. 285–301.
  - (modern English translation) Heinrich, Lisa Lynn (1977). The Kievan Chronicle: A Translation and Commentary (PhD diss.). Nashville, Tennessee: Vanderbilt University. p. 616. ProQuest 7812419

=== Literature ===
- Raffensperger, Christian (2024). Name Unknown: The Life of a Rusian Queen. Routledge. p. 232. doi:10.4324/9781003325185. ISBN 978-1-04-003014-1.
