= Family of David IV =

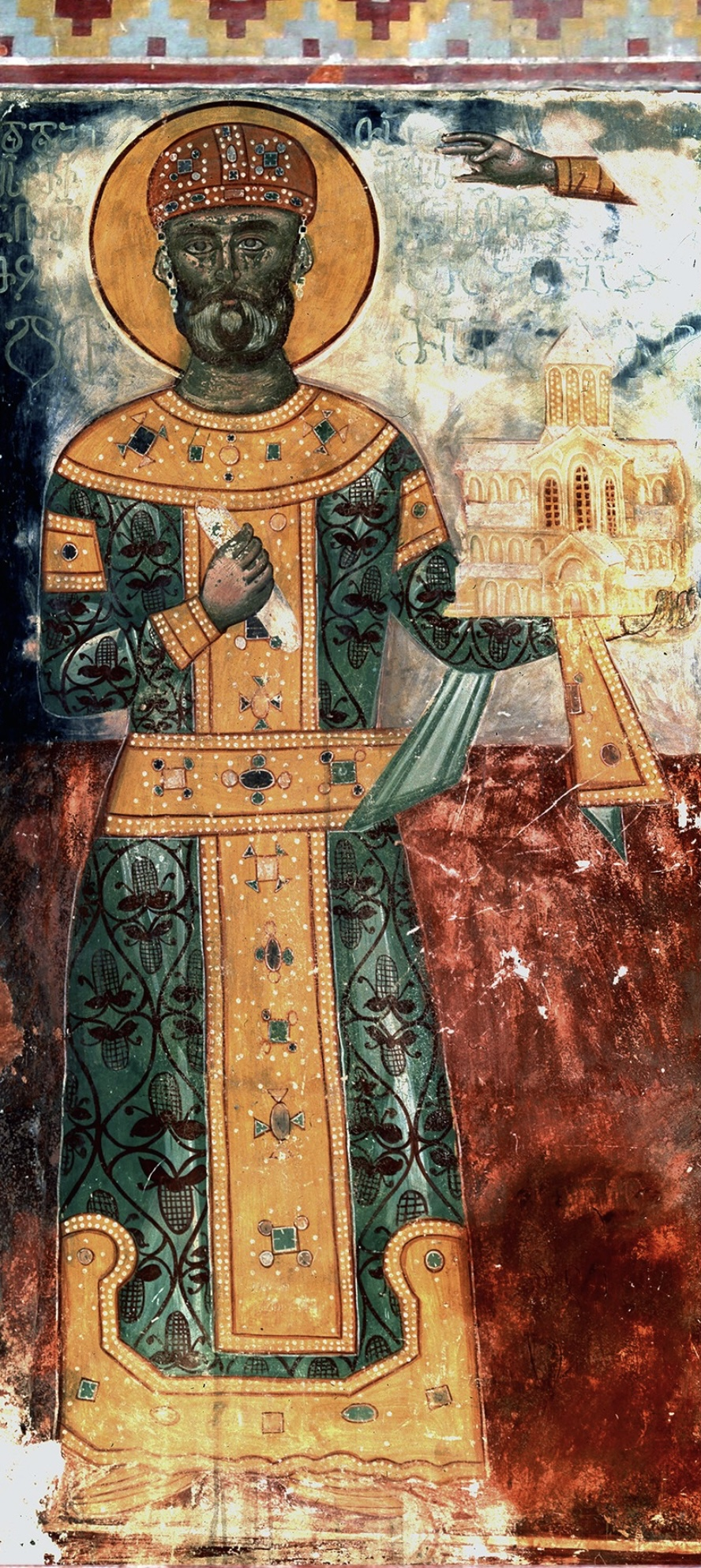
David the Builder. A 16th-century fresco from the Gelati monastery.

The family of David IV the Builder (Georgian: დავით IV აღმაშენებელი), King of Georgia (r. 1089–1125), was part of the Bagrationi dynasty. The dynasty had made their appearance in the Georgian lands in the 8th century and succeeded in unifying several native polities into a unified kingdom by 1008. David IV concluded this process of unification, setting stage for a Georgian domination in the Caucasus.

Like his Bagratid ancestors, David entertained claims of descent from the biblical king David. He was a direct descendant of the first Georgian Bagratid monarch Ashot I (died 826/830) and bore known lineage, among others, from the Abkhazian, Alanian, Artsruni, Bagratuni, and Guaramid dynasties. David's immediate family consisted of his two successive wives and several children, of whom four are relatively better documented.

== Parents and parental relations ==
According to the Life of King of Kings David (ცხორებაჲ მეფეთ-მეფისა დავითისი), written c. 1123–1126, David was the only son of King George II (r. 1072–1089). The contemporaneous Armenian chronicler Matthew of Edessa mentions David's brother Totorme. The latter, according to the modern historian Robert W. Thomson, was his sister. The name of David's mother, Elene, is recorded in a margin note in the Gospel of Matthew from the Tskarostavi monastery; she is otherwise unattested. David bore the name of the biblical king-prophet, whose 78th descendant he was claimed to be.

Through his father, David had ancestors among the most prominent dynasties of the Caucasus. David's grandfather was King Bagrat IV of Georgia and his grandmother was an Alan princess Borena. Besides he had in-law relations in Constantinople. David's paternal aunt Marta-Maria was a consort of the successive Byzantine Emperors Michael VII Doukas and Nikephoros III Botaneiates.

== Immediate family ==
=== Marriages ===
Different sources mention David's two wives of whom one, unnamed, was an Armenian lady; the other, Gurandukht, a Cuman-Kipchak, is the only one who can be precisely identified.

The Armenian chronicler Matthew of Edessa says that David's eldest son Demetrius was born from an Armenian woman. She is not mentioned in the surviving Georgian documents. A reference to the former wife of David, a king of Georgia, is found in the letter of Ansellus, cantor of the Holy Sepulchre, dating from c. 1120, with which he was sending a relic of the True Cross to the bishop of Paris. Ansellus reports that he acquired the relic from a convent of Georgian nuns only recently established in Jerusalem under the patronage of the Latin patriarch Ghibbelin. Ansellus names the founder of the nunnery as King David's "widow". Since David died only in 1125, the lady of Ansellus's letter may have been his first wife, whom he divorced for political reasons in order to marry a Kipchak princess. According to the modern historian Cyril Toumanoff, David's repudiation of his first marriage occurred c. 1107. The same author hypothesizes that David's Armenian wife was called Rusudan and she mothered all of David's children. The modern Georgian genealogists Ioseb Bichikashvili and Yuri Chikovani assume that David's elder children were born of his first marriage and at least one son, called Vakhtang, was produced from the second marriage to Gurandukht.

Gurandukht, a daughter of "the supreme leader of the Kipchaks" Otrok (Atraka), was the only wife of David mentioned by his medieval Georgian biographer. He married her years before the recruitment of around 40,000 of the Kipchaks in the Georgian service, which David effected c. 1118. Gurandukht is a Persianate name popular in medieval Georgia; her original Turkic name is unknown as are the details of her life. The chronicler of David praises Gurandukht's virtues and points out that the marriage helped David to secure the transfer of the Kipchak families as allies of the Georgian crown.

=== Children ===
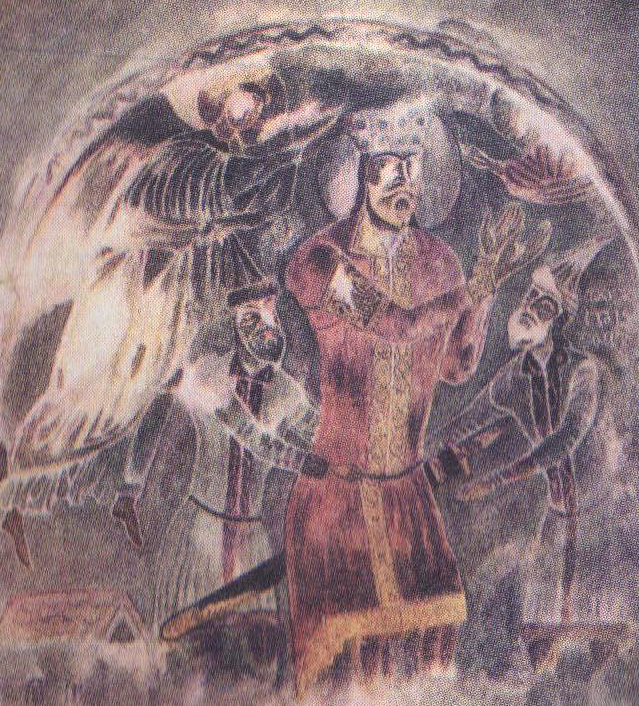
Demetrius I, son of David IV. A fresco from the Matskhvarishi church of the Savior, dated to 1140.

The Life of King of Kings David mentions David's four children, two sons—Demetrius and Vakhtang—and two daughters—Tamar and Kata.

Demetrius (Demetre), born c. 1093, was the eldest son of David IV and succeeded him to the throne of Georgia (r. 1125–1154, 1155–1156). Vakhtang, whose birth c. 1118 is mentioned in passing by David's chronicler, is further known only from the Will of King David, a 12th-century document of questionable authenticity, which also gives his possible sobriquet Tsuata. There is a reference to David's other possible son "Gorgi" (George, Giorgi) in the 13th-century Armenian chronicle of Vardan Areveltsi, but the passage, relating a conspiracy against Demetrius I in 1030, was corrupted by the later copyists and it remains open to more than one interpretation.

David's daughter Tamar was given in marriage to the Shirvanshah Manuchihr III. She founded the Monastery of Tigva in Georgia and became a nun in widowhood. Kata married into the Byzantine imperial family c. 1116. The identity of her husband is not revealed by the medieval sources. He may have been Isaac Komnenos (a son of the emperor Alexios I Komnenos), Alexios Bryennios (a son of Nikephoros Bryennios the Younger and Anna Komnene), or Alexios Komnenos (a son of the emperor John II Komnenos). If the first theory is true and Helene, a daughter of Isaac and Kata, was indeed the wife of the Rurikid Rus' prince Yuri Dolgorukiy, then this marriage may have provided, through descent from antiquity, a Bagratid ancestry to numerous Russian and Polish descendants.

The 13th-century Georgian chronicle, the Histories and Eulogies of the Sovereigns, mentions yet another daughter of David who was married off in Alania, "Ovset'i" of the Georgian sources. According to the modern genealogists such as Ioseb Bichikashvili and Cyril Toumanoff, she was named Rusudan and married into the family of Alan kings, which is claimed by the 18th-century Georgian author Vakhushti of Kartli to have been a collateral branch of the Georgian Bagratids through their descent from Demetrius, son of King George I of Georgia (r. 1014–1027), and of which David Soslan, consort of Queen Tamar of Georgia (r. 1184–1213), was the most famous representative. According to Cyril Toumanoff, Rusudan wed the Alan king Jadaron, David Soslan's father, of Vakhushti's account, while Ioseb Bichikashvili makes her the wife of David, Jadaron's hypothetical grandfather.

In total, Cyril Toumanoff tentatively identifies seven of David's children: Demetrius, George, Rusudan, Zurab, Vakhtang, Tamar and Kata. Zurab, otherwise unknown, is mentioned, along with David's successor Demetrius, in a brief chronology of the Georgian history attached to an 18th-century manuscript found and published, in 1912, by Ekvtime Takaishvili. Takaishvili, however, himself rejected his earlier identification of Zurab and Demetrius as two different sons of David IV and concluded that Zurab, derived from Sohrab, the name of a character from the Persian epic Shahnameh, might have been applied to Demetrius as an epithet just like the medieval poet Ioane Shavteli compared David IV's valor to Rostam, another hero from the Shahnameh.
