= David V =

King of Georgia from 1154 to 1155

David V დავით V

King of Georgia
- Reign: 1154–1155
- Predecessor: Demetrius I
- Successor: Demetrius I
- Born: 1113
- Died: 1155 (aged 41–42)
- Burial: Gelati Monastery
- Issue: Prince Demna
- Dynasty: Bagrationi
- Father: Demetrius I of Georgia
- Religion: Georgian Orthodox Church

David V (Georgian: დავით V, romanized: davit V; 1113 — 1155), of the Bagrationi dynasty, was the king (mepe) of the Kingdom of Georgia from 1154 until his death in 1155.

== Biography ==
David was born around 1113 and was the eldest son of Prince Demetrius and grandson of King David IV the Builder who was reigning at that time.

In the 1140s, King Demetrius I had quarreled and disinherited David and chosen his youngest son, Prince George, as heir apparent. Why they quarreled is unknown: perhaps over David's personal defects, or probably regarding the Abuletisdze family and the status of the city of Ani.

Those who had supported Prince Vakhtang during an attempted coup against Demetrius I now opposed Demetrius' unprecedented disinheritance of David and approved the surrender of Ani to Muslim rule. Vasak Artsruni and his brother, who negotiated Saltuk's release, were active supporters of David.

A first coup attempt failed around 1150, but in 1154 David's coup against his father succeeded. Demetrius was banished to a monastery and David ascended the throne as David V.

After the overthrown of Demetrius, David V granted the office of Amirspasalar (Commander-in-Chief) to Kirkish (Tirkash), son of Ivane Abuletisdze who was exposed in a plot against Demetrius and executed by the Demetrius' orders in 1130s. Kirkish's promotion upset Sumbat I and Ivane II Orbeli.

David V died suddenly six months after becoming king. According to Vardan Areveltsi, David was poisoned by Sumbat I and Ivane II Orbeli, who the Orbelis had made an agreement with the Prince George that he would appoint them generals.

According to precedence and law, after David's death, his young son, Prince Demna should have inherited the throne. But Demetrius was restored to the throne, and he crowned his younger son, George, as co-ruler and retired to David Gareja monastery. Others allege that Demetrius had also died, and that George then seized the throne illicitly. According to the Armenian historian Stepanos Orbelian, gives his family's version of the events, which, unsurprisingly, exonerates them but still firmly condemns George. Stepanos denies any family involvement in the murder of David V and says that George had sworn to David V that he would rule only until Demna reached his majority, but then reneged on his vow. He claims that the Orbelis had been the witnesses of this vow and that they led the 1177 revolt to restore Demna, who was now adult, to his rightful position.

== Family ==
David V’s wife is unknown. They had one child:

- Prince Demna (born before 1155 – died c. 1178), a pretender to the throne of Georgia.

== Bibliography ==
- Baumer, Christoph (2023). History of the Caucasus. Bloomsbury. ISBN 9780755636303.
- Eastmond, Antony (1998). Royal Imagery in Medieval Georgia. University Park: Pennsylvania State Press. ISBN 0-271-01628-0.
- Rayfield, Donald (2012). Edge of Empires, a History of Georgia. London: Reaktion Books. ISBN 978-1-78023-070-2.

== See also ==
- List of Georgian kings

Preceded by Demetrius I	King of Georgia; 1154–1155	Succeeded by Demetrius I (restored)
