= Otrok =

Early 12-century Cuman-Kipchak chieftain

Otrok (also Atrak) was an early twelfth-century Cuman-Kipchak chieftain (khan) who was involved in the wars with Kievan Rus', and later served under the Kingdom of Georgia. He was a member of the Sarukhanids, one the ruling houses of the Kipchak tribal confederation known to the Rus' as "Wild Cumans".

== Biography ==
Otrok, known in Georgia as Atraka, son of Sharagan (i.e., Sharukan), after the victories of the Rus' Grand Prince Vladimir II Monomakh in 1109, fled to Georgia with some 40,000 followers, received baptism and entered the service of the Georgian king David IV (c. 1118). The Georgian-Kipchak alliance was facilitated by David's earlier marriage to the khan's daughter who received the name Gurandukht (her original Turkic name is unknown). Otrok's Kipchaks helped David against the Seljuk Turks and contributed to the Georgian victory at Didgori in 1121. Otrok's 40,000 Cumans helped make Georgia the most powerful kingdom in the region.

A passage in the East Slavic chronicle Hypatian Codex relates that after the death of Vladimir Monomakh (1125), an envoy, the bard named Ör, arrived from Otrok's brother Sırchan, who lived near the Don, urging him to return. Ör's urges and songs were without effect until he produced some yawshan, the grass of his native steppe. With this, Otrok tearfully decided to give up the security and fame he had won in "a foreign land", and returned to the steppe where he fathered Könchek, eventually one of the most famous foes of the princes of Kiev (not to be confused with the 14th-century Chagatai khan Könchek).
