= Kipchaks in Georgia =

Nomadic peoples in the Georgian kingdom

The Cumans-Kipchaks in Georgia are of an ancient nomadic Turkic people who inhabited large territories from Central Asia to Eastern Europe. The Cuman-Kipchak confederation played a significant role in the history of many nations in the region, including Georgia. At the peak of this power, from the 12th to the 13th centuries, Georgian monarchs enlisted thousands of Kipchak/Cuman mercenaries and effectively utilized their services in conflicts against neighboring Muslim states.

== History ==
=== Early period ===
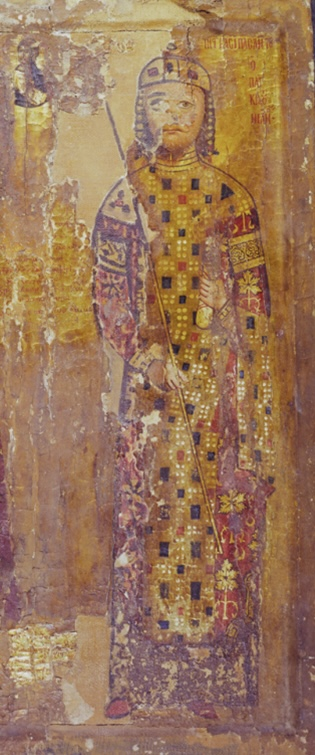
David IV, detail from icon at Saint Catherine's Monastery, 12th century.

The first contacts between the Georgians and Cumans-Kipchaks date back to the 11th century when the Cumans and Kipchaks founded a nomadic confederation in the southern black sea steppes. Their relations with Georgia seem to have been generally peaceful. Moreover, the Georgian politicians of that time saw the Cuman-Kipchaks as potential allies against the Seljuk conquests. According to Georgian chronicles, Georgians knew about the Cumans-Kipchaks good fighting skills, their bravery, and the enormous human resources that they had."

The architect of the Georgian–Cuman/Kipchak alliance was the Georgian king David IV “the Builder” (r. 1089–1125), who employed tens (or even hundreds) of thousands of Cuman-Kipchak soldiers and settled them in his kingdom in 1118. This measure, one of the central parts of David's military reforms during his wars against the Seljuk invaders, had been preceded by the visit of the high-ranking Georgian delegation, including the king himself and his chief adviser and tutor George of Chqondidi, to the Cuman-Kipchak headquarters. To secure the alliance with these nomads, David married a Cuman-Kipchak princess, Gurandukht, daughter of Khan Otrok (Atraka, son of Sharaghan, of the Georgian chronicles), and invited his new in-laws to settle in Georgia. David mediated a peace between the Cumans-Kipchaks and Alans, and probably had some consultations also with the Velikiy Kniaz of Kievan Rus', Vladimir Monomakh, who had defeated Otrak in 1109, to secure a free passage for the Cuman-Kipchak tribesmen back to Georgia.

As a result of this diplomacy, 15,000 soldiers with Cuman-Kipchak families under Otrak moved to settle in Georgia. According to the agreement, each Cuman-Kipchak family was to contribute a fully armed soldier to the Georgian army. They were given land, rearmed and became a regular force under the direct control of the king. They were posted chiefly to frontier regions confronting the Seljuk Turks. They led a semi-nomadic way of life, wintering in the Kartlian lowlands in central Georgia, and carrying out their summertime duties along the foothills of the Caucasus.

The medieval compendium of the East Slavic chronicles known as Hypatian Codex relates that after the death of Vladimir Monomakh in 1125, Khan Syrchan of the Don Kipchaks, Otrak's brother, sent a singer to Otrak and asked him to return home. Legend has it that when Otrak heard his voice and smelled steppe grass, he became nostalgic for the steppe life and finally left Georgia. However a number of the Kipchak mercenaries settled permanently within Georgia, converted to Orthodox Christianity, and integrated with the local population.

=== Later period ===
The Christianized (and already Georgianized) Kipchak officers, known to the Georgians as naqivchaqari (i.e., "de-Kipchakized"), played a crucial role in suppressing the nobles' revolts of that time. Through their loyal service to the Georgian crown they grew in influence and prestige, and emerged during the reign of George III (1156–1184) as a new military aristocracy in sharp contrast to the old, frequently self-interested, Georgian feudal lords. This caused a great discontent in the aristocratic opposition, which forced George's successor Queen Thamar (1184–1213) to retire virtually all high-ranking assimilated Cumans-Kipchaks.

Thamar and her successor, George IV Lasha (1213–1223), continued to employ Cuman-Kipchak mercenaries, perhaps in tens of thousands. They were referred by the Georgians as qivchaqni akhalni, i.e., "new Kipchaks". Some of them, however, were refused enrollment in the royal army, and they moved on to Ganja, Arran, in what is now Azerbaijan. The Georgians subsequently defeated these marauding bands and scattered them. Although the Cuman-Kipchaks continued to serve in the Georgian ranks, a number of the Cuman-Kipchak units joined the Khwarezmian prince Jalal al-Din Mangburni in his expedition against Georgia in 1225, thereby guaranteeing his victory. The Cumans-Kipchaks remained on both sides of the divide during the Mongol campaigns in Georgia in the late 1230s, but most subsequently integrated with the Mongol hordes.

== Legacy ==
According to modern Turkish scholars, the traces of the Cuman-Kipchak presence in Georgia can be found in the Turkish–Georgian borderlands, particularly in the Rize Province. They relate some of the existing local family names to the Kipchak clans who had once served to Georgia. The Kumbasars, the purported descendants of the above-mentioned king of Kubasars, are an example. The Meskhetian Turks, a large Muslim community deported from Georgia under the Soviet dictator Joseph Stalin in 1944, also claim sometimes that the medieval Cumans-Kipchaks of Georgia may have been one of their possible ancestors.

== See also ==
- Kipchaks
- History of Georgia
- Battle of Didgori
- Battle of Kalka River
- Cuman people
- Cumania
- Cuman language
- Kipchak Language

== Notes ==
=== References and further reading ===
- Anchabadze, G.Z. (1980), The Qipchaks in Georgia. — “Problems of Modern Study of Turks”. Alma-Ata (a publication in Russian)
- Chkhataraishvili, K. (1986), The Kipchak Resettlement in Georgia 1118, in: Georgian Soviet Encyclopedia (Encyclopaedia Georgiana), Tbilisi (in Georgian)
- Golden, PB (1984), Cumanica I: the Quipchaqs in Georgia, Archivum Eurasiae Mediiaevi 4: 45–87
- Kirzioglu, MF (1992), The Qipchaks in the Upper Valley of the Kura River, Ankara (in Turkish)
- Rapp, SH (2003), Studies In Medieval Georgian Historiography: Early Texts And Eurasian Contexts, Peeters Bvba ISBN 90-429-1318-5
- Suny, RG (1994), The Making of the Georgian Nation: 2nd edition, Indiana University Press, ISBN 0-253-20915-3
- Wink, Andre (2001), Nomads in the Sedentary World, Routledge (UK) ISBN 0-7007-1370-0
