= Demetrius I of Georgia =

King of Georgia from 1125 to 1156

Demetrius I
- King of Kings of Georgia
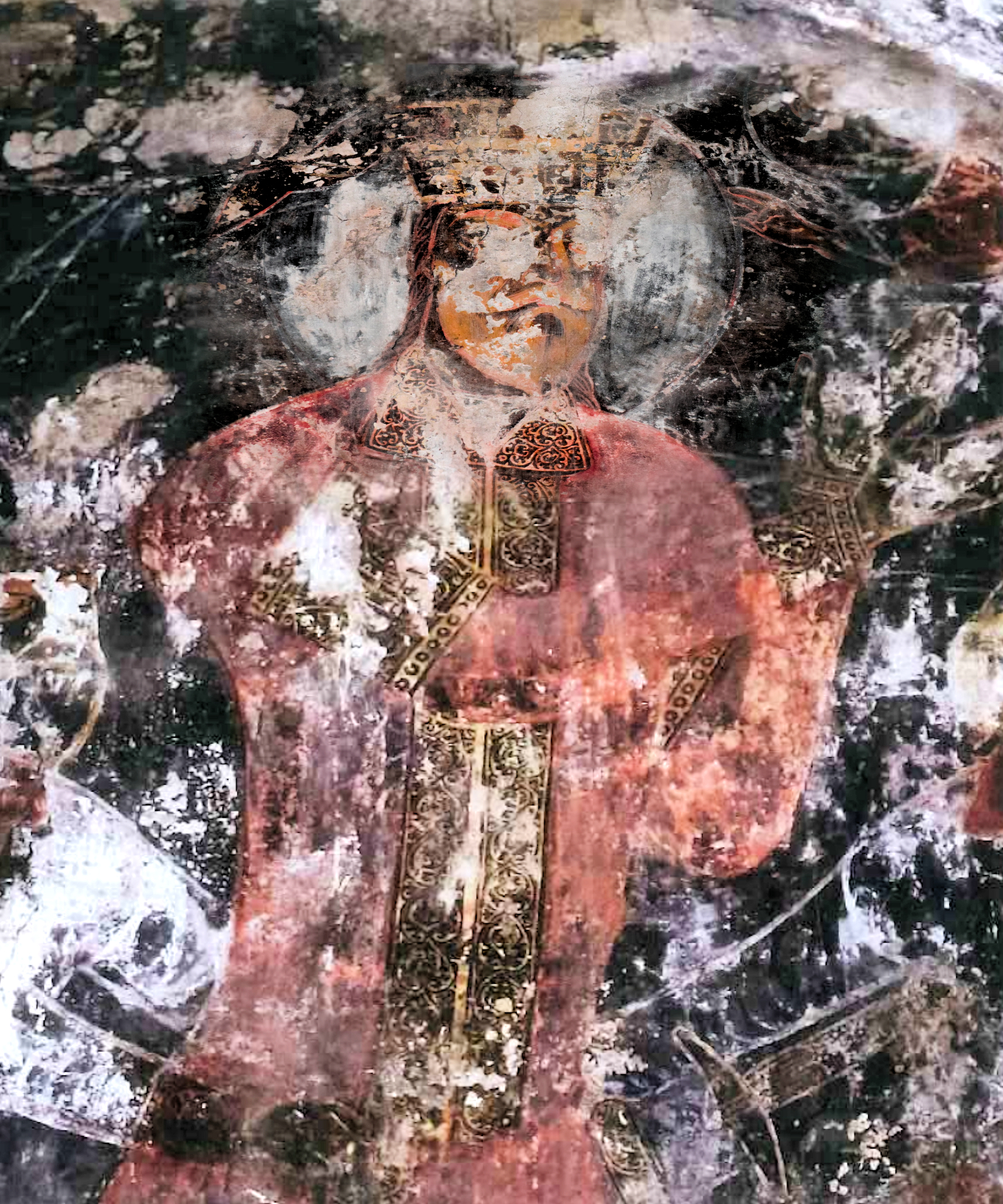
- Fresco of Demetrius I from the Matskhvarishi church of the Savior, 1140.

King of Georgia
- 1st Reign: 1125–1154
- Predecessor: David IV
- Successor: David V
- 2nd Reign: 1155–1156
- Predecessor: David V
- Successor: George III
- Born: 1093
- Died: 1156 (aged 62–63); Mtskheta
- Burial: Gelati Monastery
- Issue Among others: David V; George III of Georgia; Princess Rusudan
- Dynasty: Bagrationi
- Father: David IV
- Mother: Rusudan of Armenia
- Religion: Georgian Orthodox Church

Saint Damiane

Right-Believing
- Died: 1156
- Venerated in: Eastern Orthodox Church
- Feast: 23 May

Demetrius I (Georgian: დემეტრე I, romanized: demet're I; c. 1093 – 1156), of the Bagrationi dynasty, was a Georgian monarch (mepe) who ruled the Kingdom of Georgia from 1125 to 1154 and again from 1155 until his death in 1156. He is also known as a poet.

Regarded as a saint by the Orthodox Church, his feast day is celebrated on May 23 in the Eastern Orthodox liturgical calendar.

== Early life ==
Demetrius was the eldest son of King David IV by his first wife, Rusudan, an Armenian woman.

In 1117, King David sent Demetrius on a punitive expedition to Shirvan, where the young commander quickly earned a reputation for his remarkable military prowess. His forces captured Kaladzori Castle (later known as Alberd, now Agdash) and returned home with captives and significant wealth, cementing Demetrius's growing fame.

On August 12, 1121, during the Battle of Didgori against the Seljuk Empire, King David IV divided the Georgian army into two, with his son Demetrius leading a hidden reserve. The Georgians feigned defection, causing confusion in the enemy camp. As their leadership faltered, Demetrius launched a flanking attack, breaking the Seljuk forces. This, combined with the main assault, led to their disarray and retreat. Demetrius pursued the enemy for three days, securing a decisive victory that expanded Georgia's influence in the region.

In 1125, according to the Life of King Demetre, David IV proclaimed his son co-ruler of Georgia and crowned him with his own hands. He declared that his son Demetrius, through his wisdom, chastity, bravery, and handsome appearance, would rule Georgia successfully.

== Reign ==
Already in 1125, he had to expel the Seljuks from the fortress of Dmanisi, which controlled one of the accesses to Tbilisi from the south.

In 1125 Manuchihr, who was Demetrius' brother-in-law, regained control of western Shirvan. And in 1126, the Muslim population of Shirvan rebelled with the support of the Seljuks. In 1129-30, Demetrius reached a compromise with the support of his sister, Shirvan was again divided into two parts, the Christian part was incorporated into Georgia and the border being the Tetritsqali, while Manuchihr was appointed as the emir of eastern Shirvan and recognized Georgia's vassalage.

In 1130, the ruler of the Shah-Armens launched an attempt to oust Georgians from northern and central Armenia. Demetrius had to come to terms and give up Ani to the Shaddadids on terms of vassalage. They agreed that the Cathedral of Ani should have remained a Christian site and Georgia could intervene to protect the Christians. However, a stand-off continued for two decades.

In 1130, his half-brother Vakhtang rebelled against the king. He was supported by great feudal lord Ivane Abuletisdze, tried to overthrow Demetrius from the throne but the king captured and punished the conspirators and Vakhtang was captured, blinded and cast in prison where he apparently died shortly afterwards.

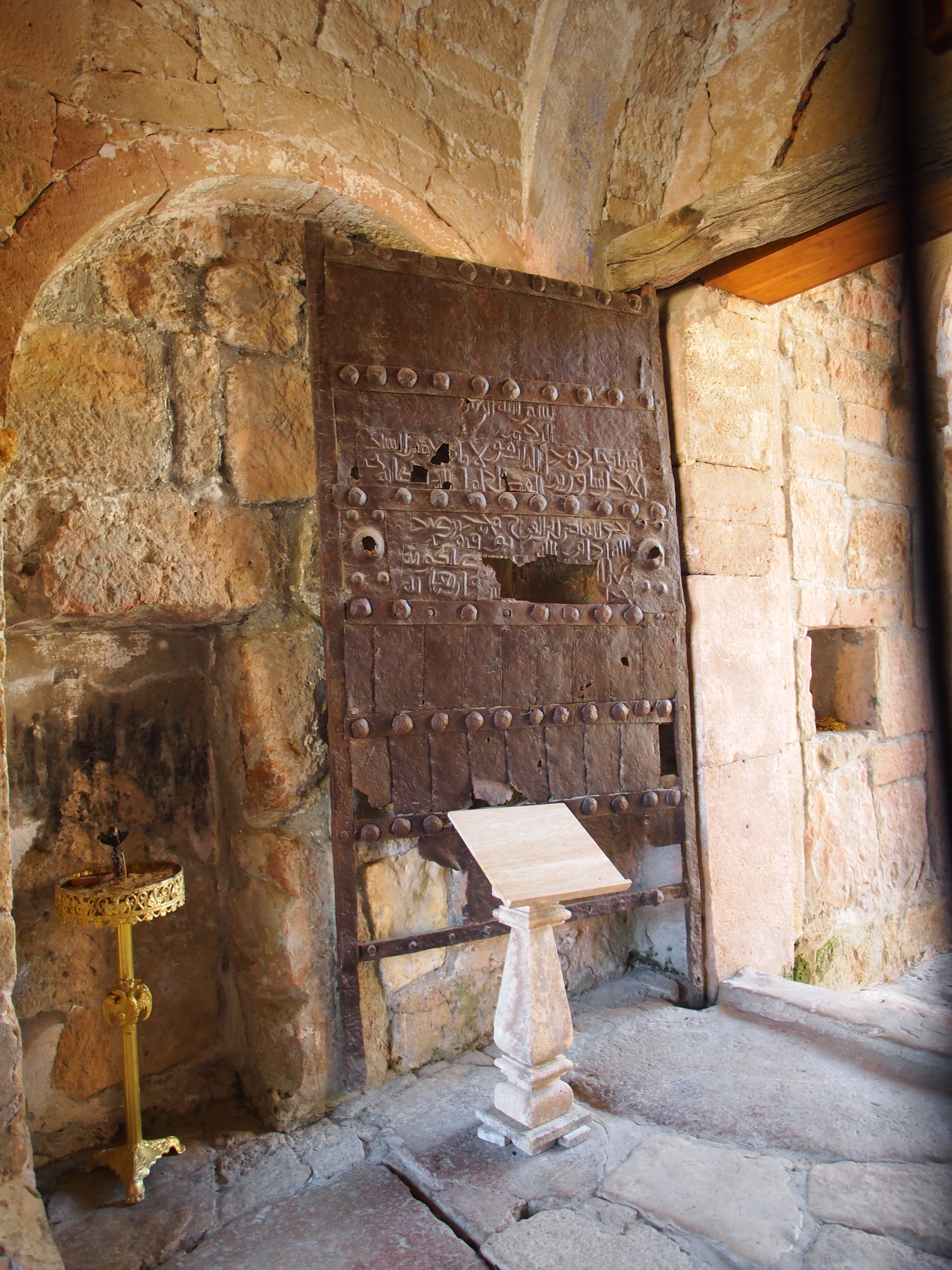
The Ancient Gates of Ganja, taken by Demetrius I as a trophy to mark Georgian victory. Currently held at the Gelati Monastery.

In 1139, Demetrius raided the city of Ganja in Arran. He brought the iron gate of the defeated city to Georgia and donated it to Gelati Monastery at Kutaisi. Despite this brilliant victory, Demetrius could hold Ganja only for a few years. In reply to this, the sultan of the Eldiguzids attacked Ganja several times, and in 1143 the town again fell to the sultan. According to Mkhitar Gosh, Demetrius ultimately gained possession of Ganja, but, when he gave his daughter in marriage to the sultan, he presented the latter with the town as dowry, and the sultan appointed his own emir to rule it.

Fadl's successor, Fakr al-Din Shaddad, a Shaddadid emir of Ani asked for Saltuk's daughter's hand, however Saltuk refused him. This caused a deep hatred in Shaddad towards Saltuk. In 1154 he planned a plot and formed a secret alliance with Demetrius. While a Georgian army waited in ambush, he offered tribute to Saltukids, ruler of Erzerum and asked the latter to accept him as a vassal. In 1153–1154, Emir Saltuk II marched on Ani, but Shaddad informed Demetrius of this. Demetrius marched to Ani, defeated and captured the emir. At the request of neighbouring Muslim rulers and released him for a ransom of 100,000 dinars, paid by Saltuk's sons in law and Saltuk swore not to fight against the Georgians.

In 1154, Demetrius gave his last daughter, whose name is unknown, in marriage to Iziaslav II of Kiev. Iziaslav died shortly afterwards and no political alliance emerged between the Kingdom of Georgia and Kievan Rus'.

In the 1140s, Georgian nobles sensed an opportunity when it became apparent that Demetrius had disinherited his eldest son David in favour of the younger, George. Those who had supported Demetrius' younger brother, Prince Vakhtang, now opposed Demetrius' unprecedented disinheritance of Prince David. A first coup attempt failed in 1150, but in 1154 David's coup against his father succeeded, Demetrius was banished to a monastery and became a monk, receiving the monastic name Damian (Damianus), while his rebellious son ascended the throne as David V.

However, Davit V died suddenly six months after becoming king. According to Vardan Areveltsi, David was poisoned by Sumbat I and Ivane II Orbeli, who Orbelis with Prince George, or Demetrius, or both had made an agreement that would appoint them as Amirspasalars. According to precedence and law, after David V's death, his young son, Prince Demna should have inherited the throne. But Demetrius was restored to the throne, and he crowned his younger son, George, as co-ruler and retired to David Gareja monastery. Others allege that Demetrius had also died, and that George then seized the throne illicitly. He died in 1156 and was buried at Gelati Monastery.

== Marriage and children ==
Demetrius's wife is unknown, but he had several children:

- David V (1113 — 1155), King of Georgia (r. 1154–1155);
- George III of Georgia (died 1184), King of Georgia (r. 1156–1184);
- Rusudan, married firstly with Sultan Ghiyath ad-Din Mas'ud in 1143 and secondly with Sultan Ahmad Sanjar, married thirdly with Sultan Suleiman.
- An unnamed daughter who married Emir Abu al-Muzaffar of Derbent in c. 1130.
- An unnamed daughter, who married Prince Iziaslav II of Kiev in 1154;

== Poems ==
King Demetrius I was an author of several poems, mainly on religious themes. Shen Khar Venakhi (Georgian: შენ ხარ ვენახი, English: Thou Art a Vineyard), a hymn to the Virgin Mary, is the most famous of them.

== See also ==
- Family of David IV of Georgia
- List of Georgian Kings
  - Georgian monarchs family tree

== Bibliography ==
- Baumer, Christoph (5 October 2023). History of the Caucasus: Volume 2: In the Shadow of Great Powers. Bloomsbury Publishing. ISBN 978-0-7556-3630-3.
- Dostourian, Ara Edmond, ed. (1993). Armenia and the Crusades, Tenth to Twelfth Centuries: The Chronicle of Matthew of Edessa. Lanham, Maryland: University Press of America. ISBN 0819189537.
- Eastmond, Antony (1998). Royal Imagery in Medieval Georgia. University Park: Pennsylvania State Press. ISBN 0-271-01628-0.
- Lortkipanidze, Mariam; Japaridze, Otar; Muskhelishvili, David; Metreveli, Roin (2012). History of Georgia in four volumes, vol. II - History of Georgia from the 4th century to the 13th century. Tbilisi: National Academy of Sciences of Georgia. ISBN 978-9941-19-585-3.
- Mikaberidze, Alexander (2011). Conflict and Conquest in the Islamic World: A Historical Encyclopedia. Vol. 1–2. ABC-CLIO.
- Rayfield, Donald (2012). Edge of Empires, a History of Georgia. London: Reaktion Books. ISBN 978-1-78023-070-2.
- Toumanoff, Cyrille (1976). Manuel de Généalogie et de Chronologie pour l'histoire de la Caucasie chrétienne (Arménie, Géorgie, Albanie) [Manual of Genealogy and Chronology of Christian Caucasian History (Armenia, Georgia, Albania)] (in French). Rome: Edizioni Aquila.

Preceded by David IV	King of Georgia; 1125–1154	Succeeded by David V
Preceded by David V	King of Georgia; 1154–1156	Succeeded by George III
