= Kipchaks =

Turkic nomadic people in Eurasia

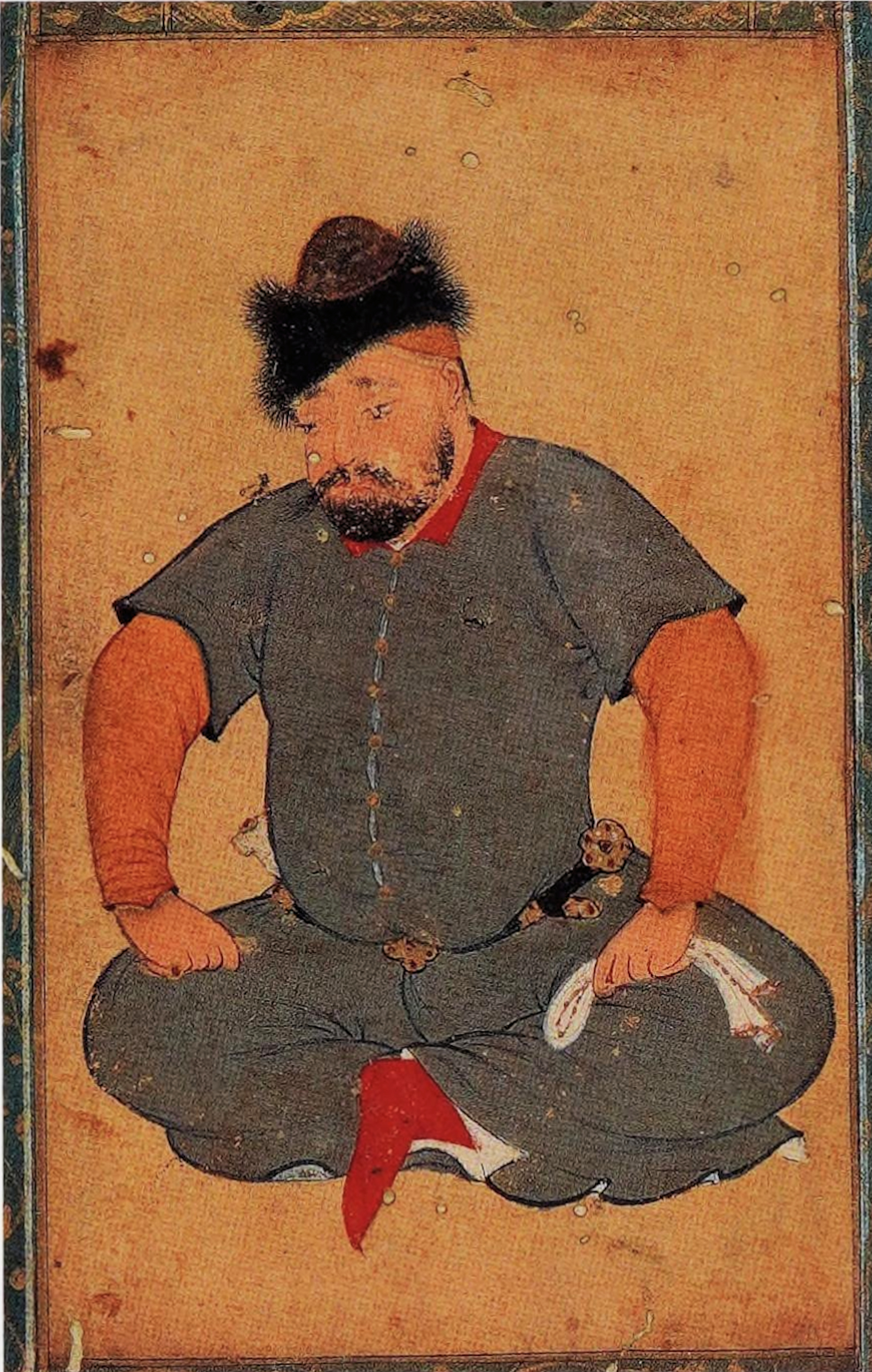
A Safavid depiction of the Padishah (Emperor) of Dast-i Qipchaq ("Steppe of the Kipchaks"). Tabriz or Qavin, circa 1550. British Museum, Padishah (Emperor) of Dast-i Qipchaq, (1550). Possible portrait of Kazakh khan

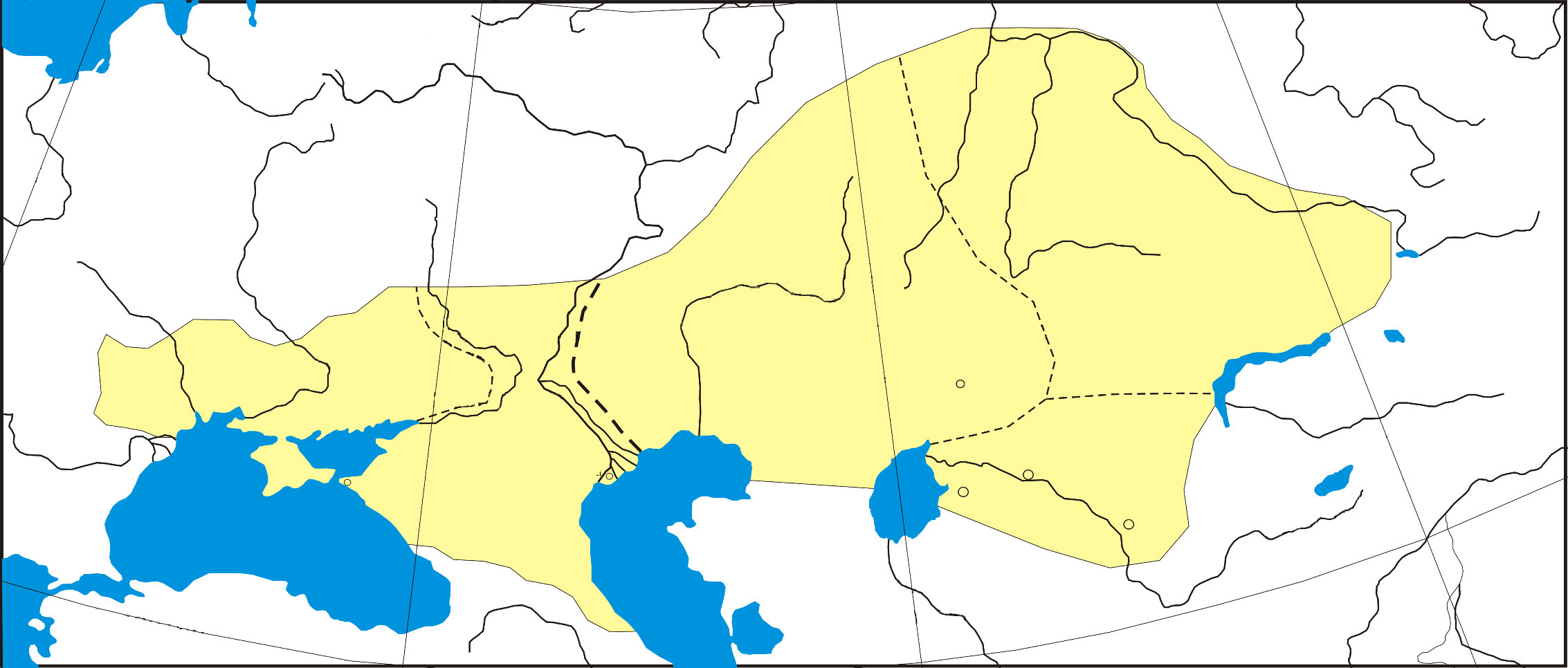
The Cumania in Eurasia, c. 1200

The Kipchaks, also spelled Qipchaqs, known as Polovtsians (Polovtsy) in Russian sources, were Turkic nomads and then a confederation that existed in the Middle Ages inhabiting parts of the Eurasian Steppe.

First mentioned in the eighth century as part of the Second Turkic Khaganate, they most likely inhabited the Altai region from where they expanded over the following centuries, first as part of the Kimek–Kipchak confederation and later as part of a confederation with the Cumans. There were groups of Kipchaks in the Pontic–Caspian steppe, China, Syr Darya, and Siberia. Cumania was conquered by the Mongol Empire in the early 13th century and integrated into the Golden Horde, which also went on to become known as Kipchak Khanate and the start of a massive Mongolisation of culture, in which the Kipchak identity was codified permanently when they started to blur the line of Mongols and Turks to become the modern formation of Turco-Mongol identity.

== Terminology ==
The Kipchaks interpreted their name as meaning "hollow tree" (cf. Middle Turkic: kuv ağaç); according to them, inside a hollow tree, their original human ancestress gave birth to her son. Németh points to the Siberian qıpčaq "angry, quick-tempered" attested only in the Siberian Sağay dialect (a dialect of Khakas language). Klyashtorny links Kipchak to qovı, qovuq "unfortunate, unlucky"; yet Golden sees a better match in qıv "good fortune" and adjectival suffix -čāq. Regardless, Golden notes that the ethnonym's original form and etymology "remain a matter of contention and speculation".

== History ==
=== Origins ===
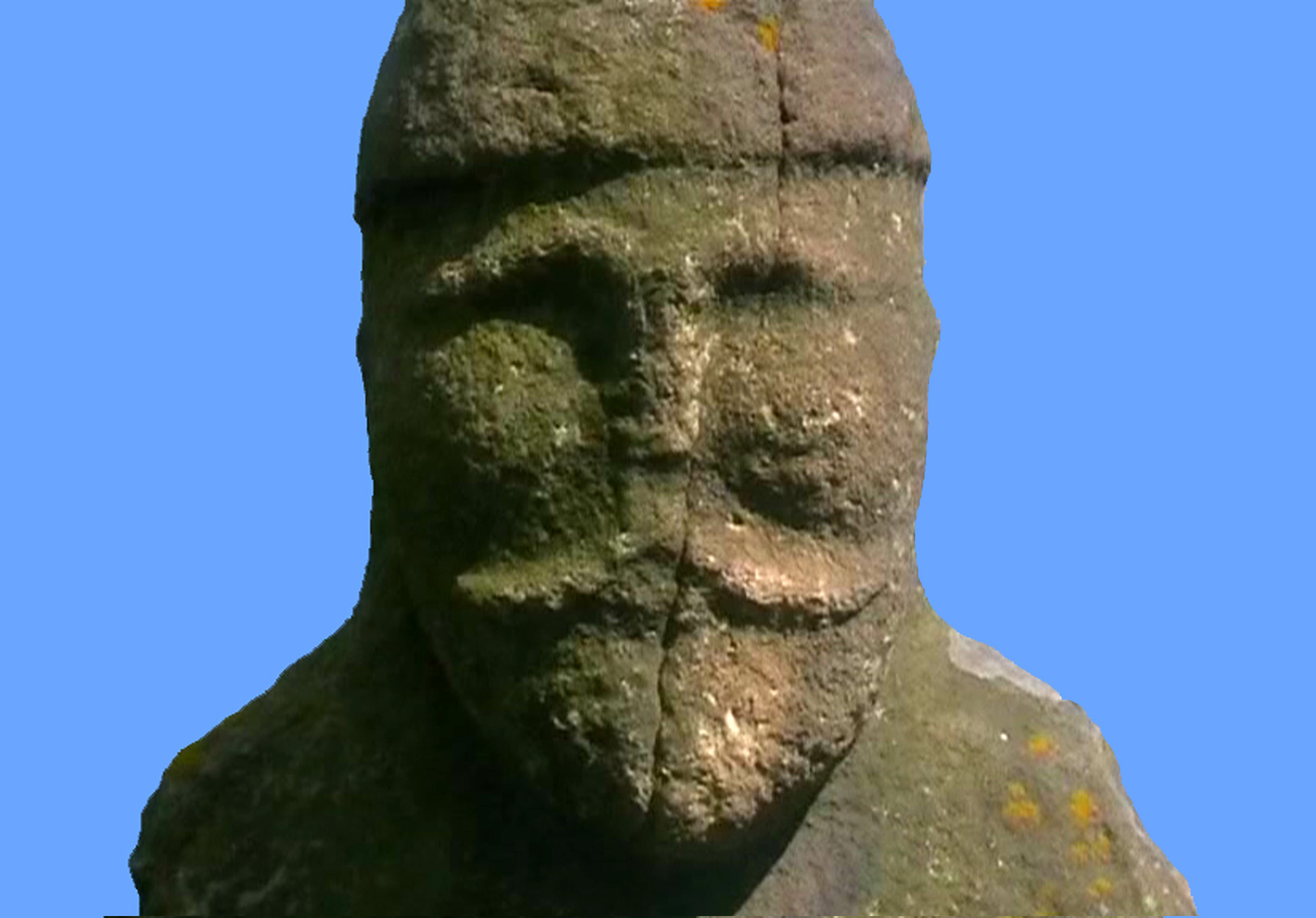
Kipchak portrait in a 12th-century balbal in Luhansk.

On the Kipchak steppe, a complex ethnic assimilation and consolidation process took place between the 11th and 13th centuries. The western Kipchak tribes absorbed people of Oghuz, Pecheneg, ancient Bashkir, Bulgar and other origin; the eastern Kipchak merged with the Kimek, Karluk, Kara-Khitai and others. They were all identified by the ethnonym Kipchak. Groups and tribes of possible Mongolic or para-Mongolic extraction were also incorporated into the eastern Kipchak conglomerate. Peter Golden argues that the Ölberli were pushed westwards due to socio-political changes among the para-Mongolic Khitans, such as the collapse of the Liao dynasty and formation of the Qara Khitai, and attached themselves to the eastern Kipchak confederation where they eventually came to form a part of the ruling strata and elite. Golden identifies the Ölberli with the Qay whom are recorded as the Xi in Chinese sources and Tatabı in Turkic inscriptions, and were of Mongolic or para-Mongolic background – likely stemming from the Xianbei.

Chinese histories only mentioned the Kipchaks a few times: for example, during Yuan dynasty Mongolian general Tutuha's origin from Kipchak tribe Ölberli, or some information about the Kipchaks' homeland, horses, and the Kipchaks' physiognomy and psychology.

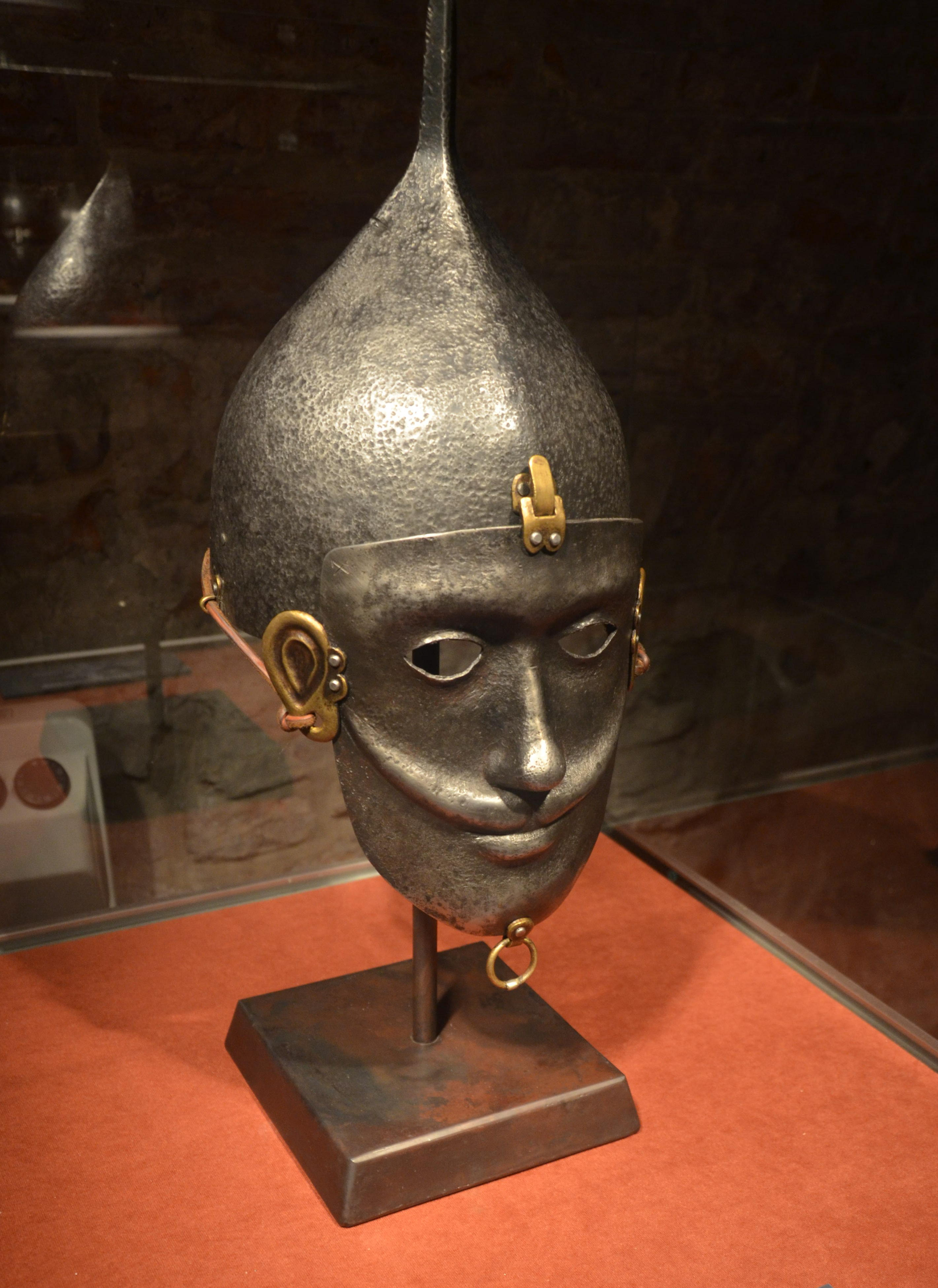
Reproduction of a 13-14th century Tatar helmet and mask found in Lipovets, without a chainmail aventail.

The Kipchaks were first unambiguously mentioned in Persian geographer ibn Khordadbeh's Book of Roads and Kingdoms as a northernly Turkic tribe, after Toquz Oghuz, Karluks, Kimeks, Oghuz, J.f.r (either corrupted from Jikil or representing Majfar for Majğar), Pechenegs, Türgesh, Aðkiš, and before Yenisei Kirghiz. Kipchaks possibly appeared in the 8th-century Moyun Chur inscription as Türk-Qïbchaq, mentioned as having been part of the Turkic Khaganate for fifty years; even so, this attestation is uncertain as damages on the inscription leave only -čq (𐰲𐰴) (*-čaq or čiq) readable. It is unclear if the Kipchaks could be identified with, according to Klyashtorny, the [Al]tï Sir in the Orkhon inscriptions (薛延陀; pinyin: Xuè-Yántuó), or with the Juéyuèshī (厥越失) in Chinese sources; however, Zuev (2002) identified 厥越失 Juéyuèshī (< MC *kiwat-jiwat-siet) with toponym Kürüshi in the Ezhim river valley (Ch. Ayan < MCh. 阿豔 *a-iam < OTrk. Ayam) in Tuva Depression. Linguist Bernard Karlgren and some Soviet scholars (e.g. Lev Gumilyov) attempted to connect the Kipchaks to the Qūshé ~ Qūshí (屈射), a people once conquered by the Xiongnu; however, Golden deems this connection unlikely, considering 屈射's Old Chinese pronunciation *khut m-lak and Eastern Han Chinese *kʰut źa ~ kʰut jak/jɑk (as reconstructed by Schuessler, 2009:314,70). (Note: Schuessler (2014) reconstructs 屈射's 200 BCE Old Chinese pronunciation as k(ʰ)ut-źak) The relationship between the Kipchaks and Cumans is unclear.

=== Early Kipchaks ===
While part of the Turkic Khaganate, they most likely inhabited the Altai region. When the Khaganate collapsed, they became part of the Kimek confederation, with which they expanded to the Irtysh, Ishim and Tobol rivers. They then appeared in Islamic sources. In the 9th century Ibn Khordadbeh indicated that they held autonomy within the Kimek confederation. They entered the Kimek in the 8th- or beginning of 9th century, and were one of seven original tribes. In the 10th-century Hudud al-'Alam it is said that the Kimek appointed the Kipchak king. The Kimek confederation, probably spearheaded by the Kipchaks, moved into Oghuz lands, and Sighnaq in Syr Darya became the Kipchak urban centre. Kipchak remnants remained in Siberia, while others pushed westwards in the Qun migration. As a result, three Kipchak groups emerged:

- Kipchaks of the Pontic–Caspian steppe.
- Kipchaks of the Syr Darya, associated with the Khwarazmian dynasty.
- Kipchaks of Siberia, later composing the Siberian Tatars.

The early 11th century saw a massive Turkic nomadic migration towards the Islamic world. The first waves were recorded in the Kara-Khanid Khanate in 1017–18. It is unknown whether the Cumans conquered the Kipchaks or were simply the leaders of the confederacy of the Kipchak–Turkic tribes. What is certain is that the two peoples gradually mingled politically and that, from the second half of the 12th century onwards, the names Cumans and Kipchaks became interchangeable to refer to the whole confederacy.

=== Mongol conquest era ===
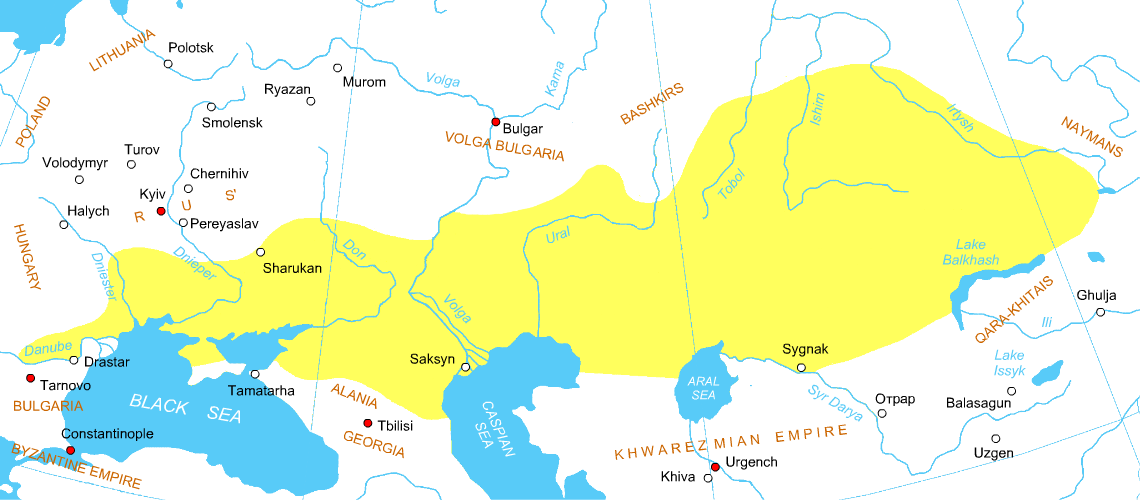
Cumania in c. 1200.

The Mongols defeated the Alans after convincing the Kipchaks to desert them through pointing at their likeness in language and culture. Nonetheless, the Kipchaks were defeated next. Under khan Köten, Kipchaks fled to the Principality of Kiev (the Ruthenians), where the Kipchaks had several marriage relations, one of which was Köten's son-in-law Mstislav Mstislavich of Galicia. The Ruthenians and Kipchaks forged an alliance against the Mongols, and met at the Dnieper to locate them. After an eight-day pursuit, they met at the Kalka River (1223). The Kipchaks, who were horse archers like the Mongols, served as the vanguard and scouts. The Mongols, who appeared to retreat, tricked the Ruthenian–Kipchak force into a trap after suddenly emerging behind the hills and surrounding them. The fleeing Kipchaks were closely pursued, and the Ruthenian camp was massacred.

The nomadic Kipchaks were the main targets of the Mongols when they crossed the Volga in 1236. The defeated Kipchaks mainly entered the Mongol ranks, while others fled westward. Köten led 40,000 families into Hungary, where King Bela IV granted them refuge in return for their Christianization. The refugee Kipchaks fled Hungary after Köten was murdered.

After their fall, Kipchaks and Cumans were known to have become mercenaries in Europe and were taken as slave warriors. In Egypt, the Mamluks were in part drawn from Kipchaks and Cumans.

In 1239–1240, large groups of Kipchaks fleeing from the Mongols crossed the Danube. These groups wandered for a long time to find a suitable place to settle in Thrace. In order to prevent the Kipchaks from plundering and to prevent the Seljuks, Mongols and Latin Empire from occupying the lands of the Empire of Nicaea and to benefit from their military capabilities, Emperor John III Doukas Vatatzes invited the Kipchaks from the Balkans to the service of the Empire of Nicaea. He settled some of them in Anatolia (what is now Turkey), to protect the Empire of Nicaea from foreign invasions. These Kipchaks preserved their identity after the Ottomans conquered the lands they lived in. The Kipchaks who settled in West Anatolia during the reign of Nicea Emperor John III Doukas Vatatzes are the ancestors of a community called Manavs living in Northwest Anatolia today.

Another Kipchak migration in Anatolia dates back to the period of the Chobanids Beylik, which ruled around Kastamonu (a city in Anatolia). Hüsameddin Emir Çoban, one of the Seljuk emirs, crossed the Black Sea and made an expedition to the Kipchak steppes and returned with countless booty and slaves. As a result of the expedition, a few Kipchak families in Crimea were brought to Sinop by sea via Sudak and settled in the West Black Sea region. In addition, maritime trade intensified with the Crimea and Kipchak regions in the Isfendiyarids Beylik.

=== Golden Horde, Mamluk Sultanate and Yuan dynasty ===
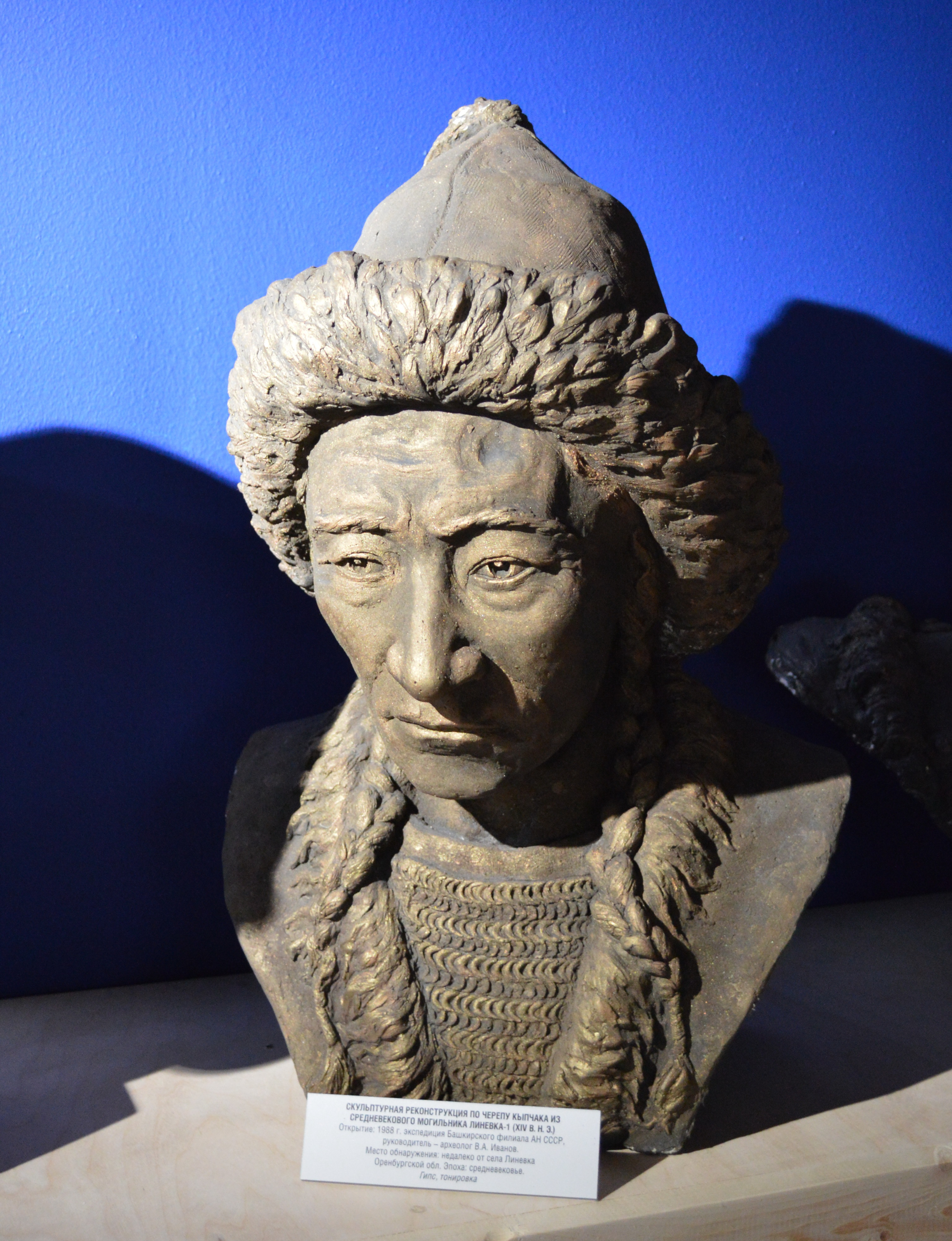
Facial reconstruction of Kipchak from 14th-century grave. Bashkortostan

Although many Kipchaks fled to avoid Mongol persecution, many other Kipchaks also stayed behind and later integrated by the Mongol conquerors of Batu Khan to form the Jochid Ulus, named after Jochi. These Kipchaks that stayed behind under the Mongol rule would experience an interesting process of Mongolization that, while not dominating Kipchaks' Turkic linguistic and ancestral lineage, was fused heavily with the Mongolian Borjigin lineage of Genghis Khan. Since the Golden Horde was far away from any Chinese, Indian, or Persian/Arab Islamic centres, and far more concentrated in the Eurasian steppe, the Mongolisation of cultural practise became so deeply entrenched that, even after the Horde underwent Turkification later on, its Mongolian lineage became so intertwined to a point it forged very uniquely Turco-Mongol peoples that, while spoke various Kipchak Turkic languages, would also become entangled with the Chinggisid dynastic roots later on.

The Egyptian Sultan's secretary at the time, Ibn Fadlallah al-Umari, mentioned about it as,

"In ancient times, this state (the Golden Horde) was the land of the Kipchaks, but when it was conquered by the Tatars (i.e. Mongols), the Kipchaks became their subjects. Later, as the Tatars intermingled and intermarried with them, the land itself overcame the original qualities and racial characteristics of the Tatars. All of them became exactly like Kipchaks, as if they were of the same stock. The Tatars settled in the land of the Kipchaks and remained there among them. Thus, long habitation in a land alters human nature and changes one's inherent features according to the nature of the country, as we said before."

At the same time, the Mamluk Sultanate, founded in 1250, was first started by the very Kipchak Bahri Mamluks, who emerged from slaves and refugees fleeing Mongol conquest to dominate from the heartland in Egypt; the state was once referred as "State of the Turks" due to the ruling class did sometimes express its Kipchak Turkic identity and did attempt to preserve this root. However, the Kipchak ruling class was not able to preserve their Kipchak origins, as they got heavily Arabised and, by the time of the dynasty's downfall in 1382 and replaced by the Circassian-led Burji Mamluks, the Arabisation ran deep among Kipchaks that they only carried few memories of their Kipchak heritages left as they became Arabs culturally and socially.

Outside the Golden Horde and Mamluk Sultanate, Kipchaks also served under the Yuan dynasty, the Sino-Mongol dynasty of Imperial China, fought in numerous wars, and established a very significant position within the Mongol realm before eventual assimilation to the much larger Han Chinese and Mongolian societies.

== Language ==
The Kipchak–Cuman confederation spoke a Turkic language (Kipchak languages, Cuman language) whose most important surviving record is the Codex Cumanicus, a late 13th-century dictionary of words in Kipchak, Cuman, and Latin. The presence in Egypt of Turkic-speaking Mamluks also stimulated the compilation of Kipchak/Cuman-Arabic dictionaries and grammars that are important in the study of several old Turkic languages.

When members of the Armenian diaspora moved from the Crimean peninsula to the Polish-Ukrainian borderland, at the end of the 13th century, they brought Kipchak, their adopted Turkic language, with them. During the 16th and the 17th centuries, the Turkic language among the Armenian communities of the Kipchak people was Armeno-Kipchak. They were settled in the Lviv and Kamianets-Podilskyi areas of what is now Ukraine, as well as between the borderland of Poland, Belarus and Lithuania.

The literary form of the Cuman language became extinct in the 18th century in the region of Cumania in Hungary. Cuman in Crimea, however, became the ancestor of the central dialect of Crimean Tatar.

Mongolian linguistic elements in the Kipchak–Kimek confederation remain "unproven"; though that confederation's constituent Tatar tribe possibly had been Mongolic speakers who later underwent Turkification.

== Religion ==
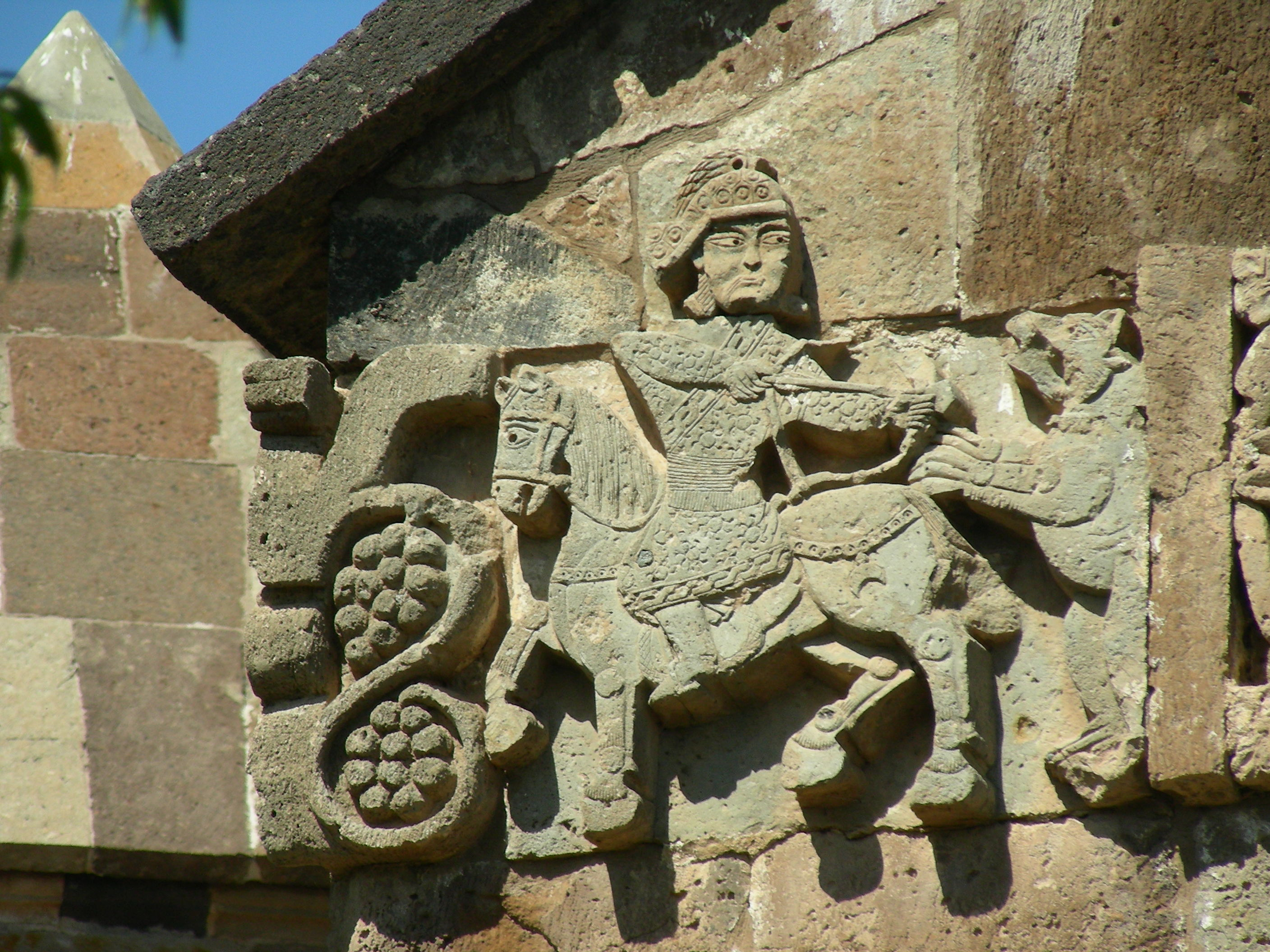
A relief on the Cathedral of the Holy Cross, Aghtamar, likely depicting a Christian Kipchak who served the Kingdom of Vaspurakan. The relief appears to be a later addition, not present when the cathedral was completed.

The original Kipchaks practiced Tengrism. Some Kipchaks and Cumans were known to have converted to Christianity around the 11th century, at the suggestion of the Georgians, as they allied in their conflicts against the Muslims. A great number were baptized at the request of Georgian King David IV, who also married a daughter of Kipchak Khan Otrok. From 1120, there was a Kipchak national Christian church and an important clergy. There were also Kipchak Christians inhabiting in what is now Armenia, in particular under Bagratid Armenia and Armenian Kingdom of Cilicia, partly due to Kipchaks in military service of these Armenian states and subsequent Mongol era, until it was defeated in the future by the Mamluks, who happened to have Kipchak connection.

Following the Mongol conquest, Islam rose in popularity among the Kipchaks of the Golden Horde, in which Muslim conversion occurred near sporadic Islamic centres. However, not until the reign of Özbeg Khan that Islam was made the official religion of Kipchaks. However, because the Golden Horde was far away from any major Islamic centres, their conversion didn't shed away the non-Islamic practises, but rather merged and fused with syncretic practise; later dispersal caused their Islamic adaption to be altered to whatever the environments required them later on, and even incorporating other beliefs like Roman Catholicism, Eastern Orthodox Christianity, Confucianism and Tibetan Buddhism alongside their dominant Hanafi school of Islam.

== Confederations ==
=== Kimek ===
The confederation or tribal union which Kipchaks entered in the 8th- or beginning of 9th century as one of seven original tribes is known in historiography as that of the Kimek (or Kimäk). Turkic inscriptions do not mention the state with that name. 10th-century Hudud al-'Alam mentions the "country of Kīmāk", ruled by a khagan (king) who has eleven lieutenants that hold hereditary fiefs. Furthermore, Andar Az Khifchāq is mentioned as a country (nāḥiyat) of the Kīmāk, 'of which inhabitants resemble the Ghūz in some customs'.

In the 9th century Ibn Khordadbeh indicated that they held autonomy within the Kimek confederation. They entered the Kimek in the 8th- or beginning of 9th century, and were one of the seven original tribes. In the 10th-century's Hudud al-'Alam it is said that the Kimek appointed the Kipchak king.

=== Cuman ===
Cumania was the next tribal confederation of the Kipchaks, for which, similar to the Kimek era, this was also a decentralised confederation of its own rights. They were often referred in Persian and Arab chronicles as "Dasht-i-Qipchaq" and "Qumaniyin".

=== Golden Horde ===
Golden Horde was the final tribal confederation of the Kipchaks. Although initially a Mongol project, cultural familiarity and deep steppe ties between these peoples would ultimately play a key role codifying the Kipchaks as a distinct Turkic group with the strongest Mongol links and elements.

=== Mamluk Sultanate ===
Mamluk Sultanate in Egypt was the only loosely organised state of the Kipchaks that fled away from Mongol conquerors until the Dissolution of the Soviet Union. Despite its Kipchak origin via the Bahri Mamluks, the nature of this state was strongly influenced by Arabist identity, and over time, the Kipchak nature was overcome by the much larger Egyptian-Arab identity, and ultimately, when the Burji Mamluks (of non-Turkic Circassian origin) took control, the Kipchak elites had been largely assimilated to Arab society.

== Physical appearance ==
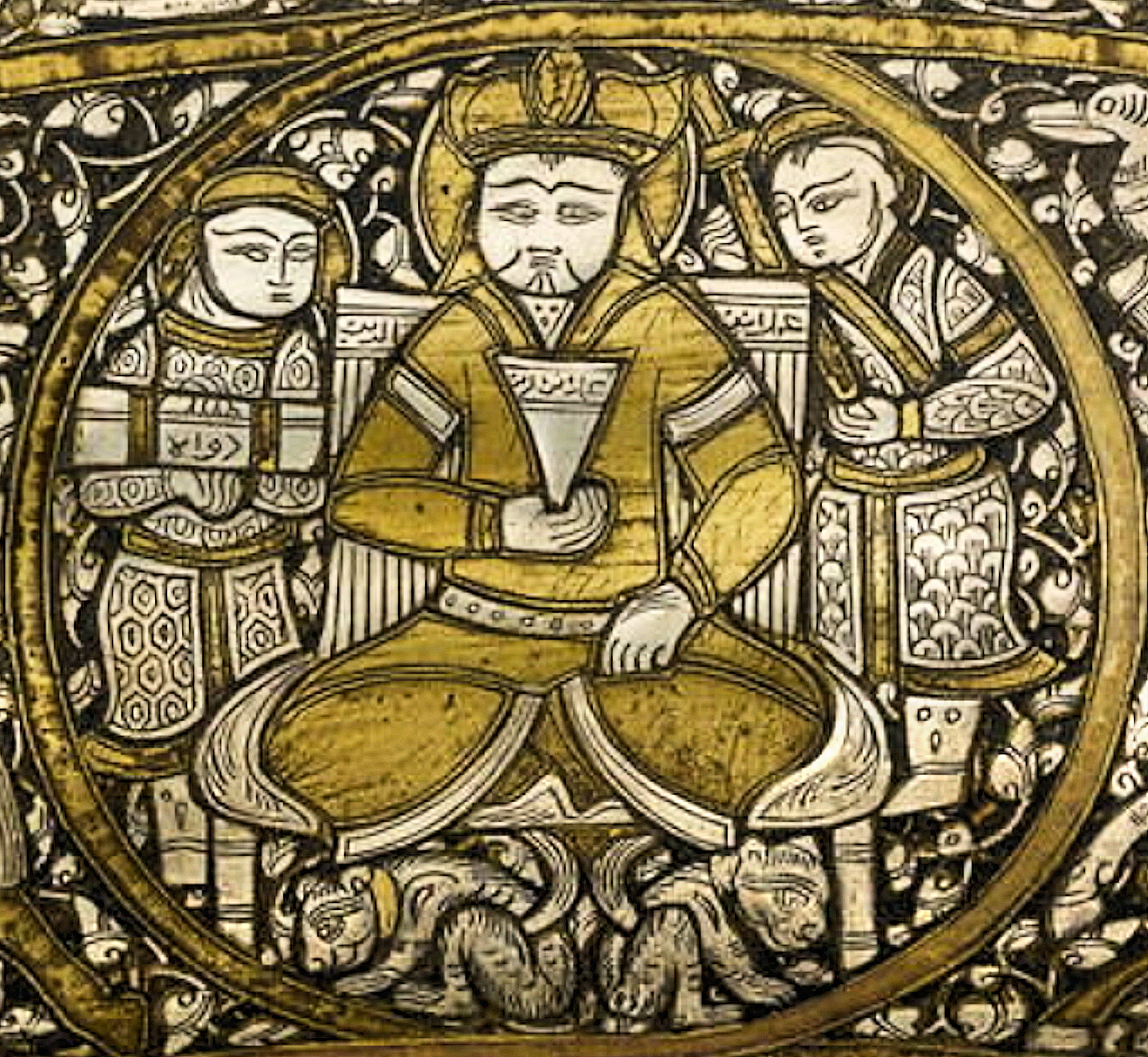
Likely near-contemporary depiction of Mamluk Sultan Baybars on the Baptistère de Saint Louis (1320–1340). Baybars was of Turkic Kipchak origin, as was Qalawun.

The looks of a typical Kipchak are a matter of debate. This is because in spite of their Eastern origins, several sources point at them being white, blue-eyed, and blond. It is important to elaborate, however, that the full range of available data sketches a more complex picture. While the written sources often emphasize a fair complexion the craniometric and genetic data, as well as some historical descriptions, support the image of a people highly heterogenous in appearance. Skulls with East Asian features are often found in burials associated with the Kipchaks in Central Asia and Europe.

An early description of the physical appearance of Kipchaks comes from the Great Ming Code (大明律) Article 122, in which they were described as overall 'vile' and having blonde/red hair and blue/green eyes. Han Chinese were not required to marry with Kipchaks. Fair complexion, e.g. red hair and blue or green eyes, were already noted by the Chinese for some other ancient Turkic tribes, such as the Yenisei Kirghiz, while the Tiele (to whom the Qun belonged) were not described as foreign looking, i.e. they were likely East Asian in appearance. It is noted that "Chinese histories also depict the Turkic-speaking peoples as typically possessing East/Inner Asian physiognomy, as well as occasionally having West Eurasian physiognomy." Lee and Kuang believe it is likely "early and medieval Turkic peoples themselves did not form a homogeneous entity and that some of them, non-Turkic by origin, had become Turkicised at some point in history." The Yenisei Kirghiz are among those suggested to be of turkicised or part non-Turkic origin. According to Lee & Kuang, who cite Chinese historical descriptions as well as genetic data, the turcophone "Qirghiz" may have been of non-Turkic origin, and were later Turkified through inter-tribal marriage. Gardizi believed the red hair and white skin of the Kipchaks was explained by mixing with the "Saqlabs" (Slavs), while Lee & Kuang note the non-Turkic components to be better explained by historical Iranian-speaking nomads.

The Egyptian Sultan's secretary at the time, Ibn Fadlallah al-Umari, differentiated between the racial characteristics of Kipchaks and Mongols.

"In ancient times, this state (the Golden Horde) was the land of the Kipchaks, but when it was conquered by the Tatars (i.e. Mongols), the Kipchaks became their subjects. Later, as the Tatars intermingled and intermarried with them, the land itself overcame the original qualities and racial characteristics of the Tatars. All of them became exactly like Kipchaks, as if they were of the same stock. The Tatars settled in the land of the Kipchaks and remained there among them. Thus, long habitation in a land alters human nature and changes one's inherent features according to the nature of the country, as we said before."

== Genetics ==
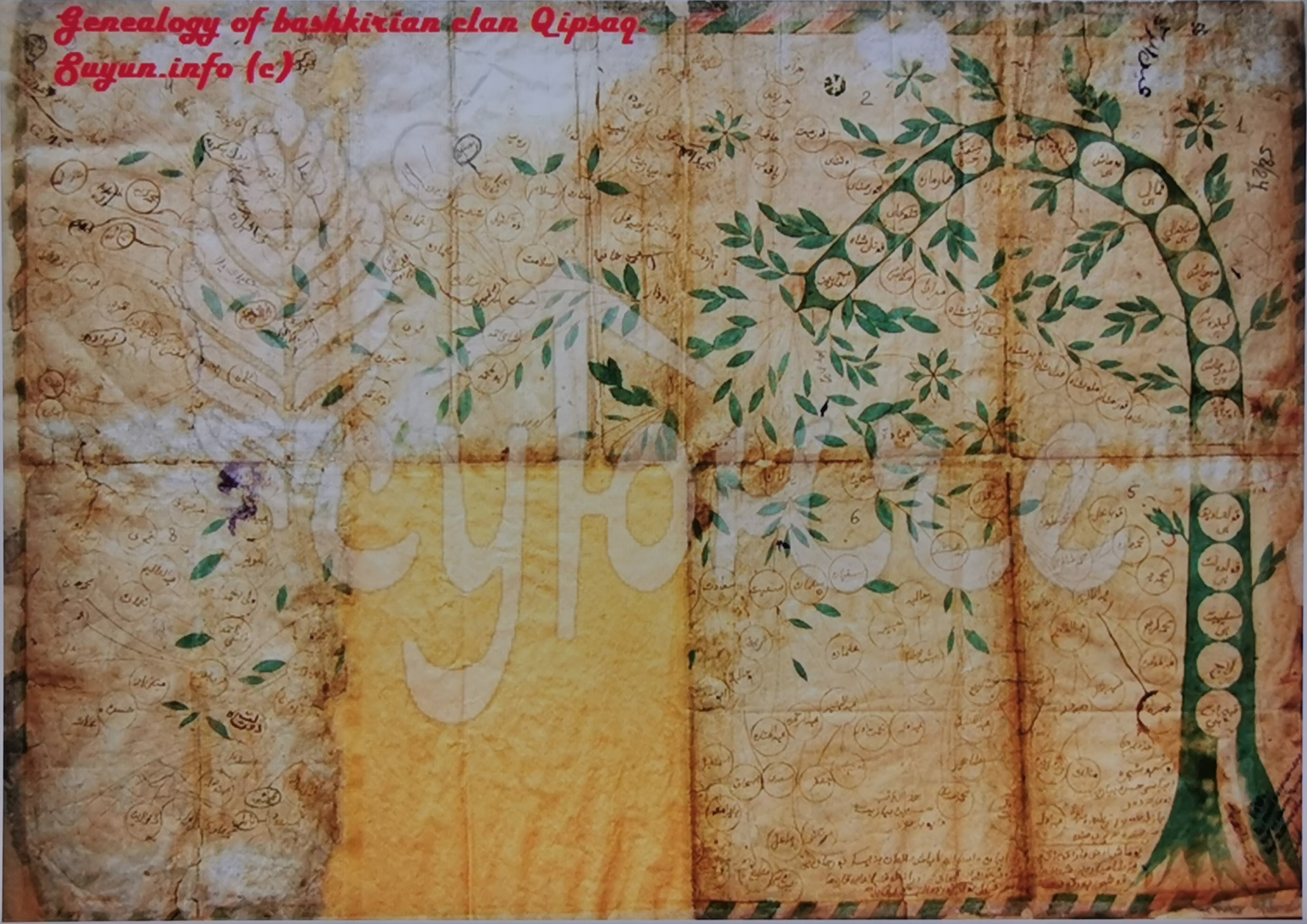
Genealogy of Bashkirian Kipchak Clan.jpg

Russian anthropologist Oshanin (1964: 24, 32) notes that the 'Mongoloid' phenotype, characteristic of modern Kipchak-speaking Kazakhs and Qirghiz, is prevalent among the skulls of the historical Qipchaq and Pecheneg nomads found across Central Asia and Ukraine. Lee and Kuang (2017) propose that Oshanin's discovery can be explained by assuming that the modern descendants of the historical Qipchaqs, particularly among the Kazakh tribes Qipchaq (Karakypshak), exhibit a high frequency of the R1b-M73 Y-DNA haplogroup. Lee and Kuang also suggest that the high frequency (63.9%) of the Y-DNA haplogroup R-M73 among the Karakypshaks (a tribe within the Kipchaks) allows for inferences about the genetics of their medieval ancestors, which may explain why some medieval Kipchaks were described as possessing "blue or green eyes and red hair." Alternatively, they propose that the western Kazakhs may be descendants of the Kipchaks, whose men have a high frequency of haplogroup C2's subclade C2b1b1 (ranging from 59.7% to 78%). This haplogroup may explain why the Qipchaq crania excavated from the kurgans (burial mounds) of eastern Ukraine exhibit an Inner Asian physiognomy. But study in 2023 published in the Journal of Human Genetics concluded that carriers of C2 among Western Kazakhs are actually descendants of medieval Alchin Mongols.

A genetic study published in Nature in May 2018 examined the remains of two Kipchak males buried between c. 1000 AD and 1200 AD. One male was found to be a carrier of the paternal haplogroup C2 and the maternal haplogroup F1b1b, and displayed "increased East Asian ancestry". The other male was found to be a carrier of the maternal haplogroup D4 and displayed "pronounced European ancestry".

== Legacy ==
=== Kipchak peoples and languages ===
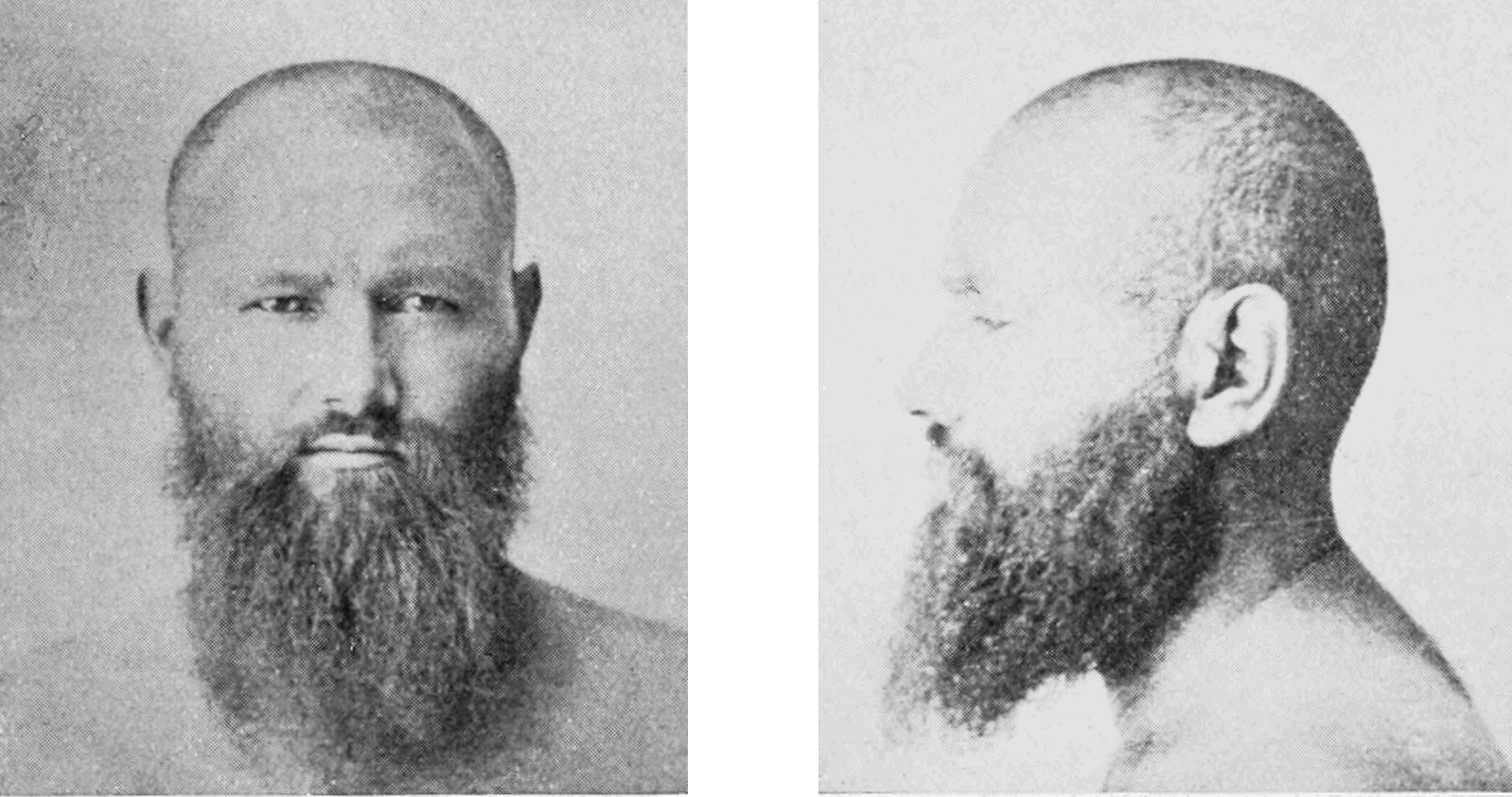
19th century photograph of a Kipchak individual.

The modern Northwestern branch of the Turkic languages is often referred to as the Kipchak branch. The languages in this branch are mostly considered to be descendants of the Kipchak language, and the people who speak them may likewise be referred to as Kipchak peoples. Some of the groups traditionally included are the Kumyks, Manavs, Karachays, Balkars, Siberian Tatars, Nogays, Bashkirs, Kazakhs, Kyrgyz, Volga Tatars, Lipka Tatars and Crimean Tatars. There is also a village named Kipchak in Crimea. Qypshaq, which is a development of "Kipchak" in the Kazakh language, is one of the constituent tribes of the Middle Horde confederation of the Kazakh people. The name Kipchak also occurs as a surname in Kazakhstan. Some of the descendants of the Kipchaks are the Bashkirian clan Qipsaq.

Radlov believed that among the current languages Cuman is closest to the Mishar dialect of the Tatar language. Especially the regional Mishar dialects of Sergachsky District have been named as "faithfully close to original Kipchak".

=== Turkic identity issue ===
Due to the dispersal post-Golden Horde, the Kipchaks had not just lost a common identity, but even their past links with Turkic world is also much weaker and less prominent compared to Oghuz and Karluk Turkic peoples. This dispersal, according from Boris Vladimirtsov, had contributed to the weakening of a common Turkic awareness among the Kipchaks; up until the advance of modern nationalism in the 19th century, orthographers and historians of both China, Russia, Europe, and other sedentary Muslim entities (Ottoman, Persia, Afghan, Mughal India, Chagatayan Uyghur and Uzbek) had struggled to identify a common Turkic identity among Kipchaks as they never referred to themselves as "Turcoman", but instead conflated between numerous regional terms like "Polovtsians", "Dzungars", "Tatars", "Mongols", "Kirghiz-Kazakhs", "Cossacks", "Uriankhai/Orangkae", "Barbarians", "Steppe Nomads", "Chechens", "Dagestanis" (among the Kumyks), "Circassians" (among the Karachays and Balkars), and even in some cases, being grouped as "Armenians", "Georgians" or "Egyptians" (via Mamluks) instead, often with deeply discriminatory tones.

This situation would only change by the late 19th century, when Ismail Gasprinsky, a Crimean Tatar intellect, was the first to advocate for the idea of a cultural pan-Turkism uniting Kipchak subjects within a Turkic framework called Jadid. However, due to historical conditions, especially as they were the group that suffered the disproportionally highest number of casualties among the three main Western Turkic peoples during the World War II and due to widespread communist oppression and forced assimilation aftermath, Kipchak descendants were not able to forge a similarly unified Turkic narrative seen with Oghuz Turkish, Azerbaijani or Karluk Uzbek, Uyghur and South Asian Muslim groups. Today, Kipchak descendants are recognised as part of the Turkic world and they are integrated within the Organization of Turkic States' frameworks, but there has been distrust among Kazakhs toward Turkey's intentions due to its traditionally pan-Turkist viewpoints.

== Notable people ==
Kipchak confederations

- Otrok was an early twelfth-century chieftain (khan)
- Ayyub Khan (fl. 1117), Kipchak leader
- Bačman (fl. 1229–1236), Kipchak leader in the Lower Volga
- Qačir-üküle (fl. 1236), Kipchak leader in the Lower Volga
- Köten (fl. 1223–1239), Kipchak leader

Kipchak ancestry

- Gurandukht (wife of David IV of Georgia)
- Taj al-Din Khatun
- Al-Mansur Qalawun, Mamluk sultan of Egypt (r. 1279–1290)
- Baibars, Mamluk sultan of Egypt (r. 1260–1277)
- El Temür, chancellor of China's Mongol-led Yuan dynasty
- Faris ad-Din Aktai, Mamluk emir
- Nasir ad-Din Qabacha, Mamluk Sultan of Multan

== See also ==
- Zbruch Idol
- Koshchei, character in Russian folklore
- Manav People
- Kipchaks in Georgia
- Afghan Kypchaks
- Nağaybäk
- History of the central steppe

== Sources ==
- Agajanov, S. G. (1992). "The States of the Oghuz, the Kimek and the Kipchak". History of Civilizations of Central Asia, Volume IV: The Age of Achievement AD 750 to the End of the Fifteenth Century. Motilal Banarsidass. pp. 61–76. ISBN 978-81-208-1595-7.
- Damgaard, P. B.; et al. (9 May 2018). "137 ancient human genomes from across the Eurasian steppes". Nature. 557 (7705). Nature Research: 369–373. Bibcode:2018Natur.557..369D. doi:10.1038/s41586-018-0094-2. hdl:1887/3202709. PMID 29743675. S2CID 13670282.
- Ergin, Muharrem (1980). Orhun Abideleri (in Turkish). İstanbul: Boğaziçi Yayınları.
- Golden, Peter B. (1990). "The peoples of the south Russian steppes". In Sinor, Denis (ed.). The Cambridge History of Early Inner Asia. Cambridge University Press. pp. 256–284. ISBN 978-0-521-24304-9.
- Golden, Peter B. (1992). An Introduction to the History of the Turkic People. Otto Harrassowitz, Wiesbaden.
- Golden, Peter B. (2014). Nurettin Demir (ed.). "Qıpčaq". Turcology and Linguistics. Éva Ágnes Csató Festschrift.
- Klyashtorny, Sergey (2005). "The Polovcian Problems (II): Qipčaqs, Comans, and Polovcians". Acta Orientalia Academiae Scientiarum Hungaricae. 58 (3). Szeged, Hungary: Akadémiai Kiadó: 243–248. doi:10.1556/AOrient.58.2005.5.2. JSTOR 23658648.
- Lee, Joo-Yup; Kuang, Shuntu (18 October 2017). "A Comparative Analysis of Chinese Historical Sources and y-dna Studies with Regard to the Early and Medieval Turkic Peoples". Inner Asia. 19 (2): 197–239. doi:10.1163/22105018-12340089. ISSN 2210-5018.
- May, Timothy (7 November 2016). The Mongol Empire: A Historical Encyclopedia [2 volumes]: A Historical Encyclopedia. ABC-CLIO. pp. 221–. ISBN 978-1-61069-340-0.
- Roux, Jean-Paul (1997). L'Asie Centrale, Histoire et Civilization. Librairie Arthème-Fayard. ISBN 978-2-213-59894-9.
- Vásáry, István (2005). Cumans and Tatars: Oriental Military in the Pre-Ottoman Balkans, 1185–1365. Cambridge and New York: Cambridge University Press. ISBN 978-0-521-83756-9.
- Zuev, Yury (2002). Rannie tyurki: ocherki istorii i ideologii (in Russian). Almaty: Daik Press.
