= Abuleti =

Georgian noble and commander

Governor of Ani
- In office 1124–1126
- Monarchs: David IV; Demetrius I
- Vice Governor: Ivane Abuletisdze

Personal details
- Children: Ivane Abuletisdze

Military service
- Battles/wars: Georgian–Seljuk wars: Siege of Samshvilde

Abuleti (Georgian: აბულეთი) was a Georgian feudal lord of the Abuletisdze family and commander under the kings David IV and Demetrius I. He was also governor of Ani from 1124 to 1126.

== Biography ==
Abuleti was a loyal nobleman from Kakheti, the founder of the Abuletisdze family, and a commander under the Georgian King David IV.

In 1110, Abuleti, alongside George of Chqondidi, Theodore, and Ivane I Orbeli, launched a successful retaliation against the Seljuk settlement, recapturing the city of Samshvilde, which was subsequently incorporated into the royal dominions without any significant battle. Following this victory, the Seljuks withdrew from much of their occupied territories, enabling Georgian forces to seize Dzerna.

In 1124, King David IV captured Ani and exiled Emir Abu'l-Aswar and his eight sons to Abkhazia. King David IV then appointed Abuleti and his son Ivane as governors of Ani. In 1126, Fadl, the son of Abu'l-Aswar, gathered troops from the Seljuk Sultan Ahmad Sanjar and used them to besiege Ani. When David IV's successor, King Demetrius I, did not send reinforcements to relieve the city, Abuleti, having learned of David IV's death and fearing the Turkish threat, surrendered Ani to Fadl.

After the surrender of Ani, Abuleti and Ivane fled to Dmanisi. The last mention of him is in 1131, when Abuleti's son Ivane conspired with King Demetrius' pretender half-brother, Vakhtang, to assassinate the king. Abuleti denounced his own son to the king, who responded decisively: Ivane was beheaded, and Vakhtang was blinded, ultimately leading to his death.

== Bibliography ==
- Rayfield, Donald (2012). Edge of Empires: A History of Georgia. London: Reaktion Books. ISBN 978-1-78023-070-2.
- Minorsky, Vladimir (1953). Studies in Caucasian History. New York: Taylor’s Foreign Press. ISBN 0-521-05735-3.
- Baumer, Christoph (2021). History of the Caucasus. Vol. 1: At the Crossroads of Empires. I.B. Tauris.
- Brosset, Marie-Félicité (1849). Histoire de la Géorgie depuis l'Antiquité jusqu'au XIXe siècle. Volume I [History of Georgia from Ancient Times to the 19th Century, Volume 1] (in French). Saint-Petersburg: Imperial Academy of Sciences.
- Metreveli, Roin (2011). Saint David the Builder (in Georgian). Vol. 13. Tbilisi: Saoǰaxo Bibliot̕eka. ISBN 9789941425509.
- Samushia, Jaba (2015). Illustrated history of Georgia. Tbilisi: Palitra L. ISBN 978-9941-21-755-5.
- Hacikyan, Agop Jack; Basmajian, Gabriel; Franchuk, Edward S.; et al., eds. (2002). The Heritage of Armenian Literature: From the sixth to the eighteenth century. Detroit, MI: Wayne State University Press. ISBN 0814330231.
- Baumer, Christoph (2023). History of the Caucasus. Bloomsbury. ISBN 9780755636303.
