= Kasagh =

Kasagh may refer to the following places in Armenia:

- Kasagh (river)
- Kasagh, Aragatsotn
- Kasagh, Kotayk
- Aparan, historically known as Kasagh
- Kasagh Basilica, a 4th-century basilica in Aparan, Armenia

== See also ==
- Kasakhi Marzik Stadium, in Ashtarak, Armenia
