= Battle of Trialeti =

1110 Georgian victory over the Seljuks

- Part of the Georgian–Seljuk wars
Date	1110
Location	Near Trialeti, Kingdom of Georgia
Result	Georgian victory

Belligerents
Kingdom of Georgia	Seljuk Empire

Commanders and leaders
David IV	Unknown

Strength
1,500	100,000

The Battle of Trialeti, fought in 1110, was a conflict between the Kingdom of Georgia and the Seljuk Empire. Following the Georgian capture of Samshvilde and Dzerna in the same year, the Sultan of the Seljuk Empire dispatched an army of 100,000 troops to Georgia. However, this force was defeated by a Georgian army of 1,500 men, led by King David IV, in the Battle of Trialeti.

== Background and battle ==
In 1110, the Kingdom of Georgia, led by George of Chqondidi's nephew Theodore and Kakhetian nobleman Abuleti, launched a retaliation against the Seljuk occupation. They successfully recaptured the heavily fortified town of Samshvilde, followed by the liberation of the Kura valley. In the wake of this victory, the Seljuks abandoned much of their previously captured territories, enabling Georgian forces to seize the town of Dzerna.

In response to these defeats, in 1110 Sultan Muhammad I Tapar unexpected invaded Georgia with an army of 100,000 men. (Note: "The Seljuk sultan responded by amassing an army of 100,000...") David IV, responded to the invasion by sending 1,500 men from his personal household. He organized a forced night march and successfully ambushed the Seljuk advance before they reached the Trialeti Mountains, preventing them from reaching the Kartli Plain. The Seljuks, fatigued from their long march, were forced to fight from a disadvantageous position and despite their numerical superiority, the Seljuks could not overcome David's well-positioned forces and ultimately retreated. According to the Georgian Chronicles, David did not initially believing the victory was achieved so easily and remained on the battlefield until the following day, anticipating another Seljuk attack. It was only then that he realized the Seljuks had been defeated.

Had David IV chosen to avoid an immediate confrontation and instead gathered a more substantial army, he may not have been able to assemble a force in time before the Seljuks withdrew, leading to the collapse of the kingdom.

== Aftermath ==
With the Seljuk Empire defeated in Georgia and distracted by the Crusades, David was able to focus his energies on relationships with the Kipchaks. He resettled a Kipchak tribe of 40,000 families from the Northern Caucasus in Georgia in 1118–1120. Every Georgian and Kipchak family was obliged to provide one soldier with a horse and weapons. Kipchaks were settled in different regions of Georgia. Some were settled in Inner Kartli province, others were given lands along the border. They were Christianized and quickly assimilated into Georgian society.

== Sources ==
- Allen, W.E.D. (1932). A History of the Georgian People. London: Routledge & Keagan Paul.
- Baumer, Christoph (2023). History of the Caucasus. Bloomsbury Publishing. ISBN 9780755636303.
- Brosset, Marie-Félicité (1849). Histoire de la Géorgie depuis l'Antiquité jusqu'au XIXe siècle. Volume I [History of Georgia from Ancient Times to the 19th Century, Volume 1] (in French). Saint-Petersburg: Imperial Academy of Sciences.
- Kaukhchishvili, Simon (1955). La vie du Karthli – Texte complet et commentaires le concernant (in Georgian). Tbilisi: Publication d'État..
- DeVries, Kelly; Rogers, Clifford; France, John (2022). "De velitatione bellica and the Georgian Art of War During the Reign of David IV". Journal of Medieval Military History. XX. Boydell & Brewer: 1–16. ISBN 9781783277186.
- Lortkipanidze, Mariam; Japaridze, Otar; Muskhelishvili, David; Metreveli, Roin (2012). History of Georgia in four volumes, vol. II - History of Georgia from the 4th century to the 13th century. Tbilisi: National Academy of Sciences of Georgia. ISBN 978-9941-19-585-3.
- Metreveli, Roin (2011). Saint David the Builder. Tbilisi. ISBN 9789941425509.
- Norris, Harry (2009). Islam in the Baltic: Europe's Early Muslim Community. I.B. Tauris.
- Rayfield, Donald (2012). Edge of Empires : A History of Georgia. Reaktion Books.
- Samushia, Jaba (2015). Illustrated history of Georgia. Tbilisi: Palitra L. ISBN 978-9941-21-755-5.
