= Shoreti Monastery =

Medieval Christian monastery in Georgia

- შორეთის მონასტერი
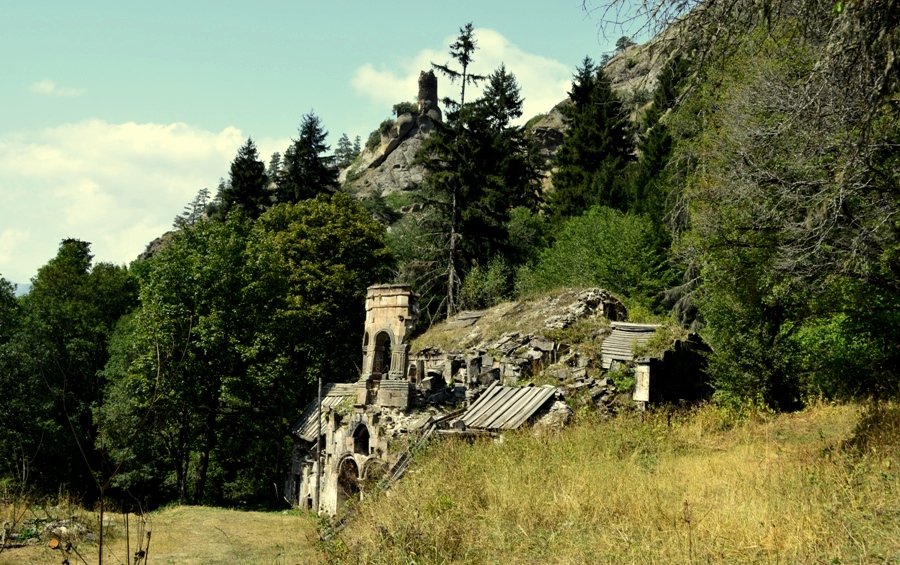
- Shoreti church standing in ruins in 2014.
- Interactive map of Shoreti Monastery
- Location: Ota, Aspindza Municipality, Samtskhe-Javakheti, Georgia
- Coordinates: 41.615411°N 43.334218°E
- Type: Monastic complex

The Shoreti Monastery (Georgian: შორეთის მონასტერი, romanized: shoretis monast'eri) is a medieval Christian monastery in south Georgia, lying in a rocky valley in the Aspindza Municipality, Samtskhe-Javakheti. It consists of several structures, the main church, dedicated to Saint George, was built in several construction phases between the 6th–7th and the 15th century. The church, standing in ruins in 2014, was completely rebuilt in 2018. It is notable for mosaic adornments and medieval inscriptions. The monastery is inscribed on the list of the Immovable Cultural Monuments of National Significance of Georgia.

== Location and history ==
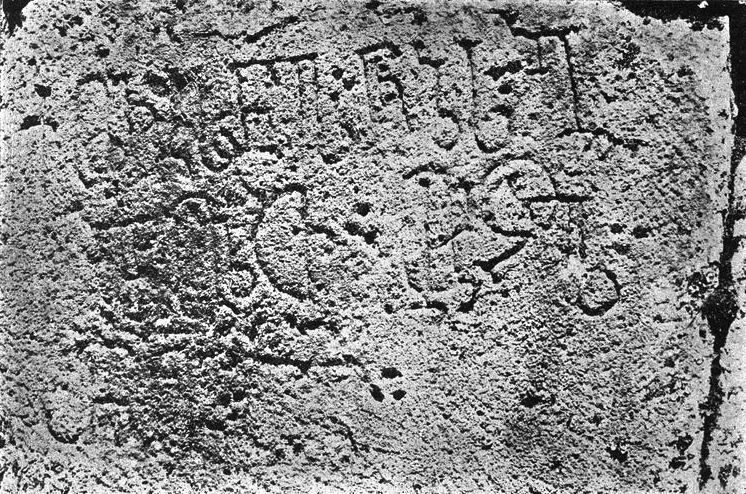
A nuskhuri inscription, reading: "Lord, have a mercy on Nikoloz, head of the masons, Amen!" (published 1909).

The Shoreti Monastery is located in a rocky ravine, some 6 km northeast of the modern village of Ota, Aspindza Municipality, and can be accessed through an off-road trail or a hiking route. The ravine, known as the Aspindzis-Khevi, lies in the historical province of Samtskhe, on the conventional border with Javakheti and Trialeti.

The monastery is only occasionally mentioned in written records. Its original, and more accurate, name is Shorota (შოროთა), which appears in the 13th–14th-century margin notes of the Vani Gospels manuscript as well as an Ottoman fiscal document dated to 1595. Prince Vakhushti of Kartli, compiling his Description of the Kingdom of Georgia in 1745, erroneously refers to the monastery—abandoned by that time—as Shorapani. The French scholar of Caucasian antiquities, Marie-Félicité Brosset, who visited the monastery in the snowy winter of 1849, transcribes its name as "Choloth"; his guide, Kiamyl-Beg, a Muslim Georgian nobleman of the Diasamidze family, provided him with an alternative name, "Taïdj". The current name Shoreti was popularized by the historian Ekvtime Taqaishvili who explored the half-ruined monastery in 1902. Neglect and earthquakes brought the former monastic complex to the verge of a complete collapse. A series of conservation works and archaeological studies were conducted between 1986 and 2009, and finally, the building was systematically studied and fully rebuilt from 2015 to 2018.

== Layout ==
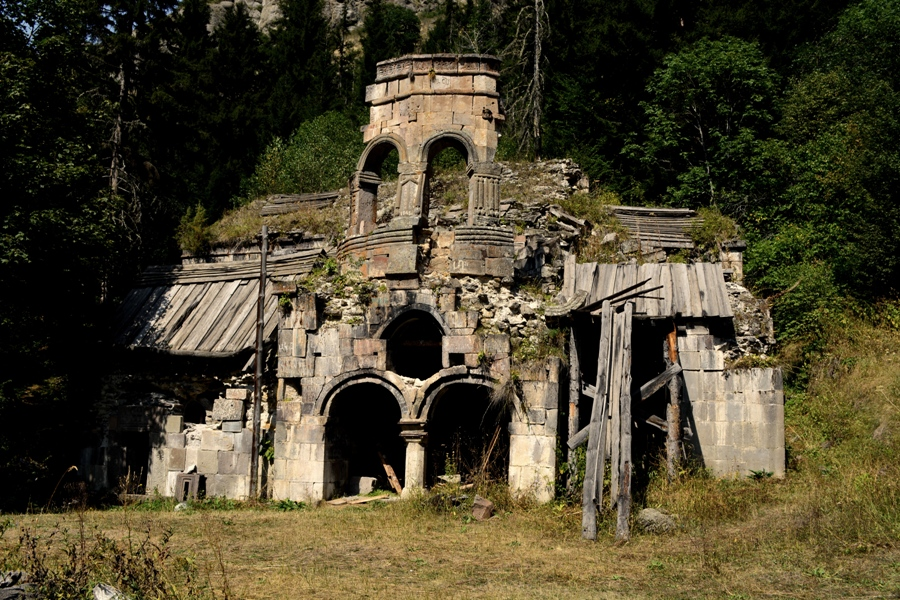
View from the south as of 2014.

The Shoreti Monastery consists of the main church, a bell tower, scriptorium, fort with a small chapel, and rock-cut cells. The main church, set in a two-nave basilican plan, is a two-storey composite building, extensively altered, rebuilt, and enlarged in the course of history. The earliest construction phase, probably preceded by an earlier, 6th–7th-century shrine, is indicated by courses of brickwork in two crypts, and refectory as well as a stone stela, with a carved stylized cross, built into a doorway under the sanctuary. The upper floor is an elongated, internally cruciform hall. The ground floor has a porch on the south. A bell tower—with nine arched, parallel-sided apertures—forms an addition to the porch, which was enlarged for this purpose in the 14th or 15th century. The south façade of this structure contains a tripartite composition, in which two arches, supported on an octagonal column, form an entrance, topped by a third arch. A small chapel and scriptorium annexed to the church on the south and west, respectively, were built in the 12th or 13th century, when the church appears to have been significantly enlarged and converted into a lavra.

The church is notable for a Byzantine wall mosaic with the depiction of the Mother of God, surviving as a concentration of loose mosaic tesserae, a rare adornment in Georgian church art, with only three other instances known at Tsromi, Gelati, and Martvili. The church bears several medieval Georgian inscriptions. One, on the south façade, makes mention of the chief mason Nikoloz; another commemorates the catholicos Mikel.
