= Siege of Samshvilde =

Siege by George of Chqondidi against the Seljuk Empire

- Part of the Georgian–Seljuk wars
Date	1110
Location	Samshvilde, Kvemo Kartli, Georgia 41°30′26″N 44°30′20″E
Result	Georgian victory

Belligerents
Kingdom of Georgia	Seljuk Empire

Commanders and leaders
George of Chqondidi; Abuleti; Ivane I Orbeli; Theodore	Unknown

The siege of Samshvilde was a siege of the city of Samshvilde by the Bishop George of Chqondidi who captured the city on behalf of King David IV. This induced the Seljuks to hastily evacuate most of surrounding districts.

== Background ==
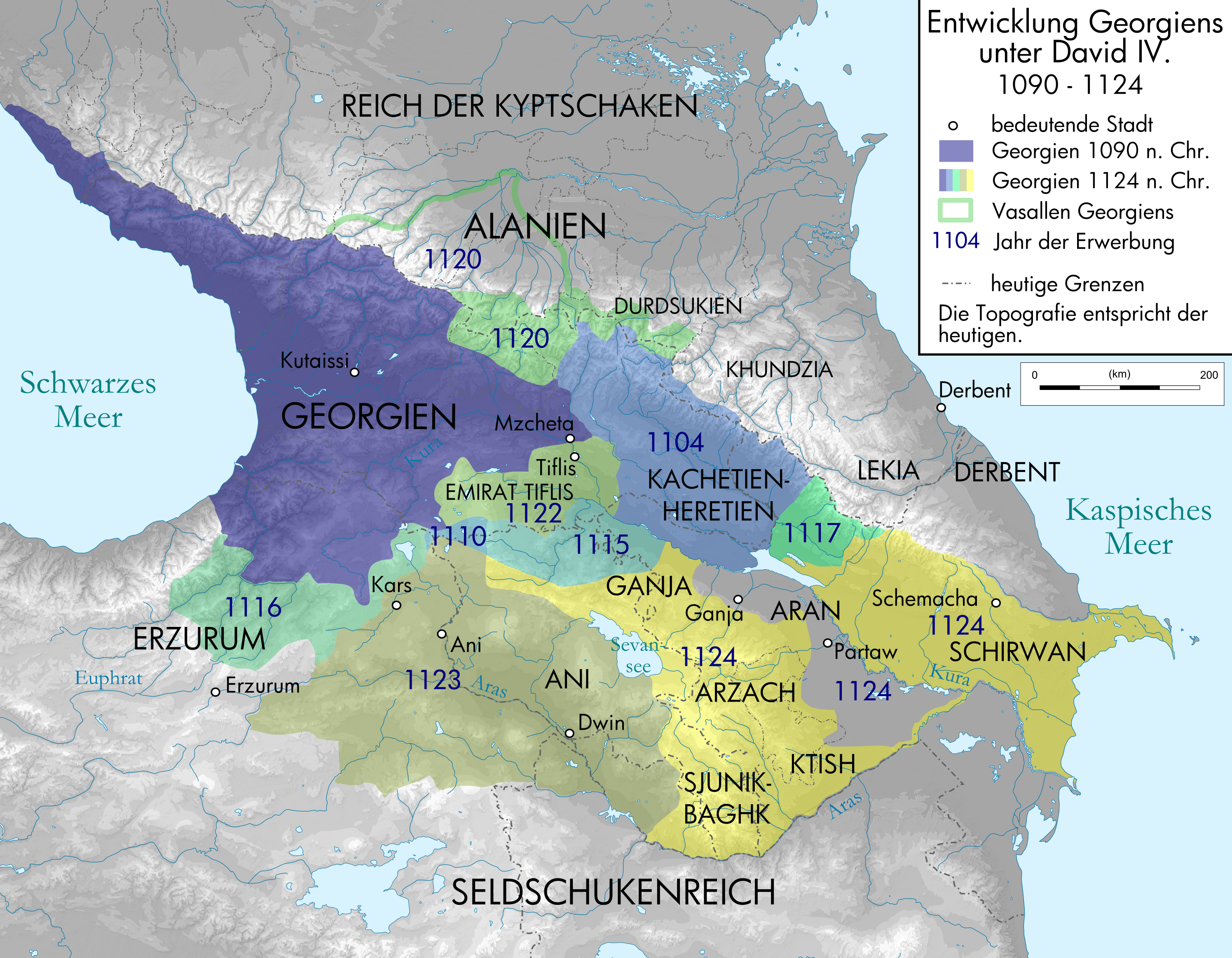
Expansion of Kingdom of Georgia under David IV's reign.

Samshvilde was the capital of the Kingdom of Tashir-Dzoraget until, Kiurike II, was made captive by King Bagrat IV of Georgia and had to ransom himself by surrendering Samshvilde to the Georgians in 1064. King George II, conceded control of the city to his powerful vassal Ivane I of Kldekari, thereby buying his loyalty, in 1073. Within a year or so, Samshvilde was conquered by the Seljuks under Malik-Shah I.

== Siege ==
In 1110 the Georgians led by George of Chqondidi, his nephew Theodore, governor of Trialeti, Abuleti and Ivane I Orbeli, retaliated against the Seljuk settlement and recaptured the town of Samshvilde, which was added to the royal domains, without a major battle. Following this capture, the Seljuks left a large part of their occupied territories, allowing Georgian troops to capture Dzerna.

== Aftermath ==
Responding to this double defeat, Sultan Muhammad I Tapar in 1110, sent a large army of 200,000 or 100,000 (or only 10,000 according to the Armenian version of the Georgian Chronicles) soldiers with the aim of invading Georgia. Knowing of the approach of Turkish troops, David IV left his home at Nacharmagevi with a personal guard of only 1,500 men and set out to meet the invaders during the night. The two armies, clearly unequal, clashed the next day at the Battle of Trialeti in a hard fight which ended in a decisive victory for Georgia. The Georgian Chronicles relate that, not believing in such a simple victory, the king remained there until the next day, waiting for a new Seljuk response, and only then realized the Seljuk defeat.

== Bibliography ==
- Rayfield, Donald (2012). Edge of Empires, a History of Georgia. London: Reaktion Books. ISBN 978-1-78023-070-2.
- Thomson, Robert W. (1996). Rewriting Caucasian history: the medieval Armenian adaptation of the Georgian chronicles; the original Georgian texts and the Armenian adaptation. Oxford: Clarendon Press. ISBN 0198263732.
- Lordkipanidze, Mariam (1987). Georgia in the XI-XII Centuries. Tbilisi: Ganatleba.
- Samushia, Jaba (2015). Illustrated history of Georgia. Tbilisi: Palitra L. ISBN 978-9941-21-755-5.
- Metreveli, Roin (2011). Saint David the Builder (in Georgian). Vol. 13. Tbilisi: Saoǰaxo Bibliot̕eka. ISBN 9789941425509.
- Brosset, Marie-Félicité (1849). Histoire de la Géorgie depuis l'Antiquité jusqu'au XIXe siècle. Volume I [History of Georgia from Ancient Times to the 19th Century, Volume 1] (in French). Saint-Petersburg: Imperial Academy of Sciences.
- Allen, W.E.D. (1932). A history of the Georgian people; from the beginning down to the Russian conquest in the nineteenth century. London: Routledge & K. Paul. ISBN 0-7100-6959-6.
- Kaukhchishvili, Simon (1955). La vie du Karthli — Texte complet et commentaires le concernant (in Georgian). Tbilisi: Publication d'État. ISBN 99928-43-44-6.
