= Samshvilde Sioni church =

Georgian Orthodox cathedral

- სამშვილდის სიონი
- Ruins of the Samshvilde Sioni church
- Interactive map of Samshvilde Sioni church
- Location: Samshvilde, Tetritsqaro Municipality, Kvemo Kartli, Georgia
- Coordinates: 41.506966°N 44.503482°E
- Type: Ruined church

Samshvilde Sioni church (Georgian: სამშვილდის სიონი, romanized: samshvildis sioni) is a ruined Georgian Orthodox cathedral from the medieval period. It is one of the main architectural features of the historic site of Samshvilde, located in Georgia's southern region of Kvemo Kartli. A centralized domed building with apsed sanctuary and pastophoria, the church was built between 759 and 777. It is now in ruins and only fragments of the eastern wall remain standing. The church is inscribed on the list of the Immovable Cultural Monuments of National Significance of Georgia.

== History ==
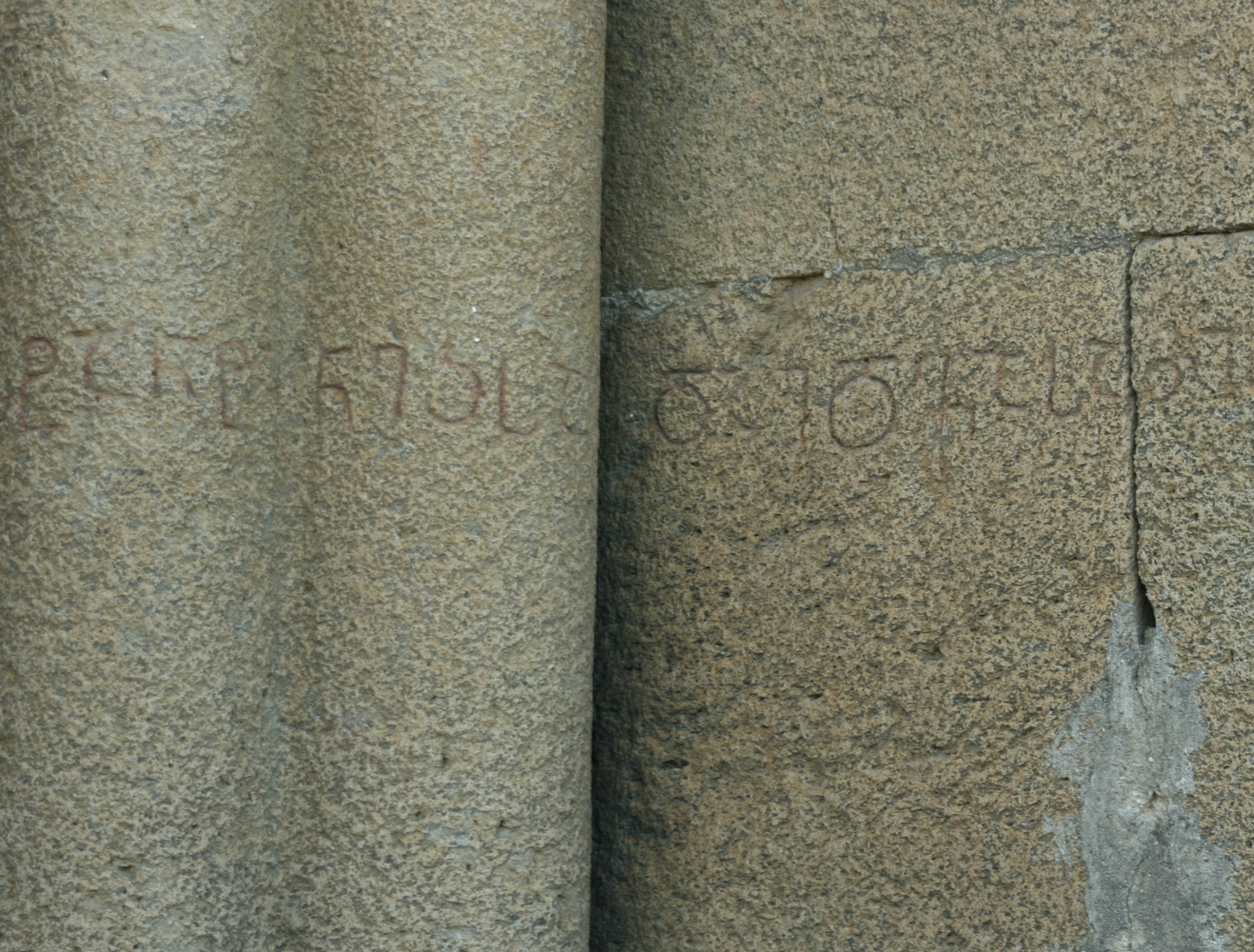
Ruins of the Samshvilde Sioni church still feature Georgian inscriptions from the 8th century.

The Sioni church is part of the Samshvilde historic site, which is centered in a naturally fortified location, a rocky terrain at the confluence of the Khrami and Chivchavi rivers, 4 km south of the town of Tetritsqaro. Following a medieval Georgian tradition of naming churches after particular places in the Holy Land, the cathedral bears the name of Mount Zion at Jerusalem. The early medieval Georgian Chronicles credit the 5th-century Queen Sagdukht of Kartli—the Iberia of the Classical sources—with founding the church of Sioni at Samshvilde; archaeologists have not been able to locate the remains of this church.

The extant fragments of the Sioni church date to the period of 759–777 as suggested by a foundational inscription, in the medieval Georgian asomtavruli script, from the better-preserved eastern façade, containing references to the contemporary Byzantine emperors Constantine V and Leo IV the Khazar.

== Layout ==
The Sioni church is built of neatly hewn yellow sandstone blocks and externally measures 24 × 24 metres. It is a three-nave building with a centrally located dome, with an oblong rectangular ground plan. The Samshvilde church bears marked similarities to the church of Tsromi in Shida Kartli in its plan and conception, but here, unlike Tsromi, two long ambulatory galleries ran on the south and north, ending in separate chapels (eukterion) on the east.

The dome rested on the crossing of longitudinal and transverse axes and was supported by four free-standing pillars. The transition from the square bay to the circle of the dome was effected through squinches. The side apses communicated openly with the sanctuary and the central bay rather than forming individual chambers. Apart from the 8th-century Georgian foundation inscription, there is another, heavily damaged, almost illegible Georgian inscription in the southern façade and, next to it, a fragment in Armenian identifying the Armenian catholicos Gevorg III Loretsi (r. 1069–1072).
