= Gntuni =

The Gntuni family was an ancient Armenian noble family who can be traced back to late antiquity.

== Background ==
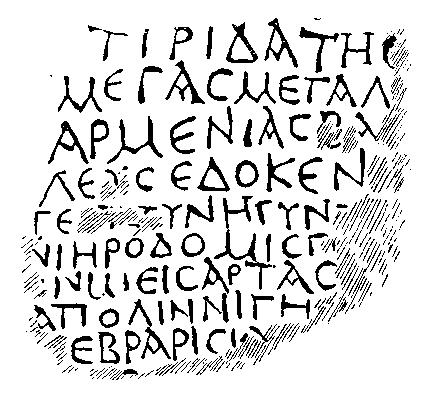
4th century inscriptions of Tiridates II of Armenia rewarding Hrodomithr the new city of Nig. Found in Aparan.

According to Khorenatsi, the Gntuni family were believed to be of Canaanite origin and were the master of the wardrobe in Armenia. They were aspets of Nig and were centered in the city of Kasala. The earliest mentioned prince of the family was Hrodomithr, who was awarded the city by King Tiridates II.

From c. 914 to 921, they ruled the town of Samshvilde as vassals of the Bagratid Kingdom of Armenia.
