= Samshvilde Sioni inscription =

Georgian inscription

Samshvilde Sioni Georgian inscription
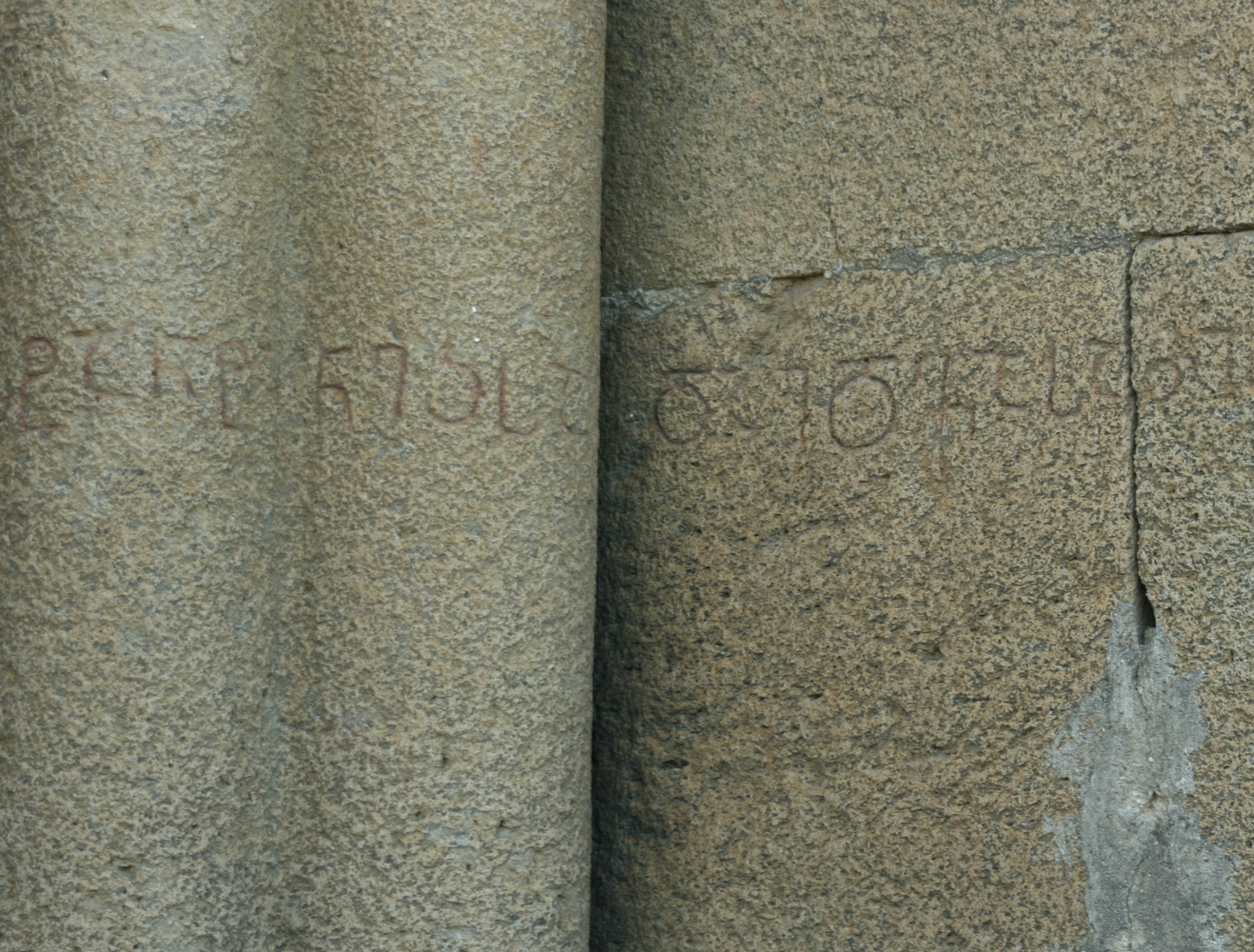
- Writing: Georgian script
- Language: Old Georgian

The Samshvilde Sioni inscription (Georgian: სამშვილდის სიონის წარწერა) is the Georgian language inscription written in the Georgian Asomtavruli script on the Sioni Church in Samshvilde, a ruined cathedral located in the Tetritsqaro Municipality, Kvemo Kartli, Georgia. Originally the inscription was 35 metres long but only 10 metres of inscription survived. The inscription mentions Georgian eristavis Varaz-Bakur and Iovane and two Byzantine Emperors, Constantine V and Leo IV the Khazar.

== Inscription ==
ႨႧႠ ႩႠႺႧႫႭႷႳႠႰႤ ႱႠႷႭႴႤႪႨ ႤႱႤ ႧႤႱႠႥႨႧ ႮႲႾႸႨ ႼႪႠ Ⴉ ႫႤႡႠ ႩႭႱႲႠႬႲႨႬႤჂႱႠ ႣႠႨႣႥႠ ႱႠႻႨႰႩႥႤႪႨ ჄႤႪႨႧႠ Ⴋ ႠႸႤႬႤႡႠჂ ႥႦႡႩႰ ႸႤႨႱႳႤႬႠ ႣႠ ႫႨႱႠ ႳႩႳႠႬ ႨႭႥႠႬႤ ႨႱႼႰႠႴႣႨႱ ႠႤႱႰႳႪ Ⴈ ႱႰႳႪႨႠႣ ႠႶႸႤႬႤႡႠჂ ႼႣ Ⴀ ႱႲႭႥႠႧႠ ႣႠ ႼႪႠ Ⴂ ႪႤႭႬ ႫႤႴႠ ႣႶႤႱႠ ႤႬႩႤႬႨႠႱႠ ႷႭ ႱႠႲႴႳႰႤႡႠჂ Ⴅ ႣႶႤ ႣႨႣႨႧႠ ႩႰႤႡႨႧႠ ႢႠႬႸႳ

- Translation: "Jesus Christ, built by the mercy of Christ and love of mankind, for praying the Holy Theotokos, o Christ have mercy on the relatives of pitiaksh. Of the year of reign of King Constantine that laid the ground for this, and it was built. Varaz-Bakur took a rest here and is behind of this and Iovane looked forward for it. And it was built. It was entirely built, this Holy Church, and in the year of reign King Leon, in the days of September, three days of gathering there was, and for its adornment."

== Dating ==
Several scholars differently dated the inscription because of its damage. Sargis Kakabadze dates it to 778 AD, Giorgi Chubinashvili - 8th century, Ekvtime Takaishvili - 958 AD, where Marie-Félicité Brosset thought the inscription was dated to 1313 AD.
