= Kasagh Basilica =

Church in Aparan, Armenia

Aparan Basilica
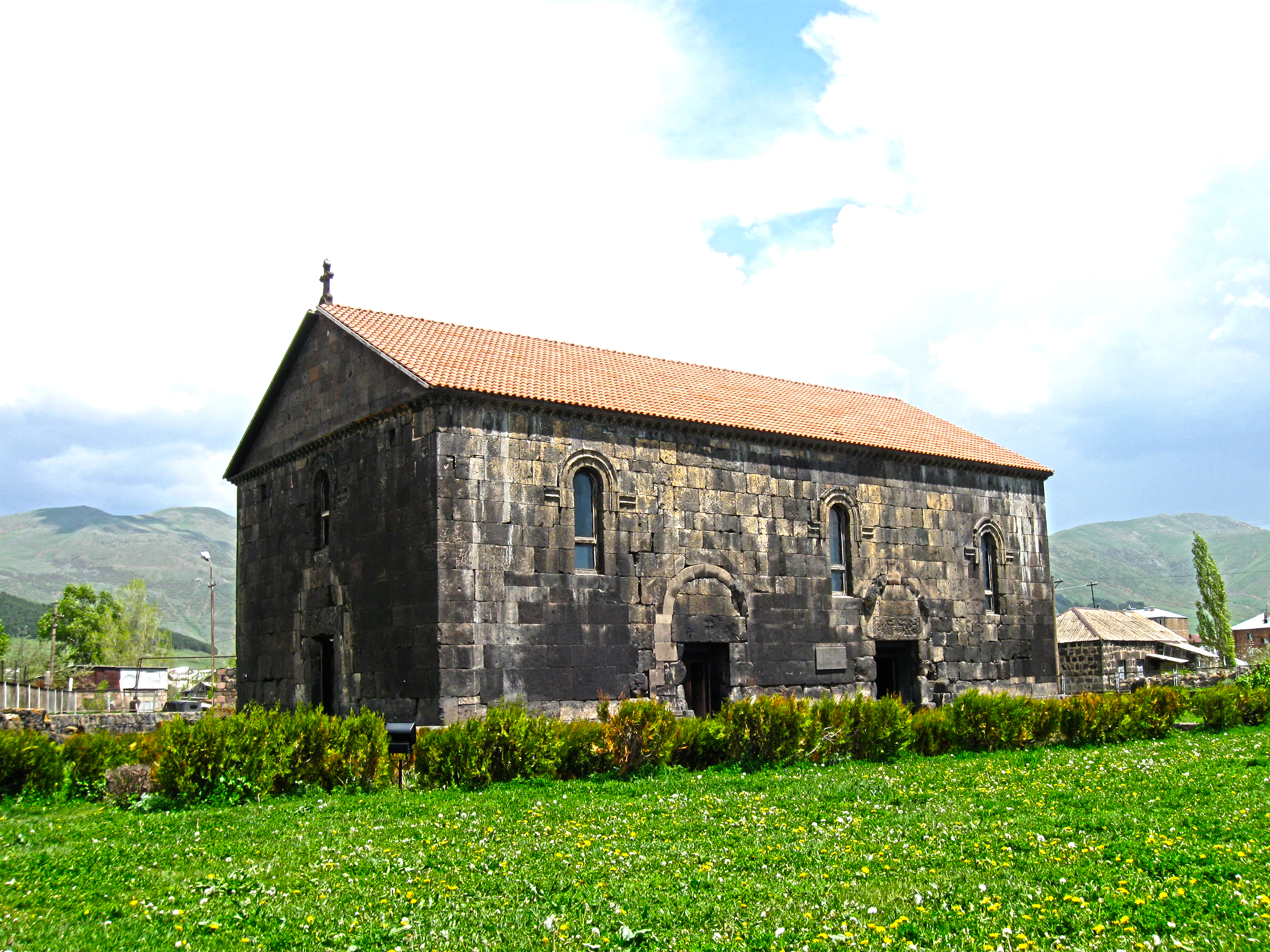
- The basilica in 2014

- Location within Armenia Location within Aragatsotn

Religion
- Affiliation: Armenian Apostolic Church

Location
- Location: Aparan, Aragatsotn Province, Armenia
- Coordinates: 40.595065°N 44.357969°E

Architecture
- Type: Single-nave undomed basilica
- Style: Armenian
- Completed: 4th or 5th century

The Kasagh Basilica (Armenian: Քասաղի բազիլիկա) or the Aparan Basilica, formally known as the Holy Cross Church (Սուրբ Խաչ եկեղեցի, Surb Khach yekeghetsi), is an early medieval Armenian church in the town of Aparan in the Aragatsotn Province of Armenia. It is dated by scholars to the fourth or fifth century. It was originally within the grounds of the Arsacid (Arshakuni) dynasty palace. The church was partly restored in 1877.

== Gallery ==
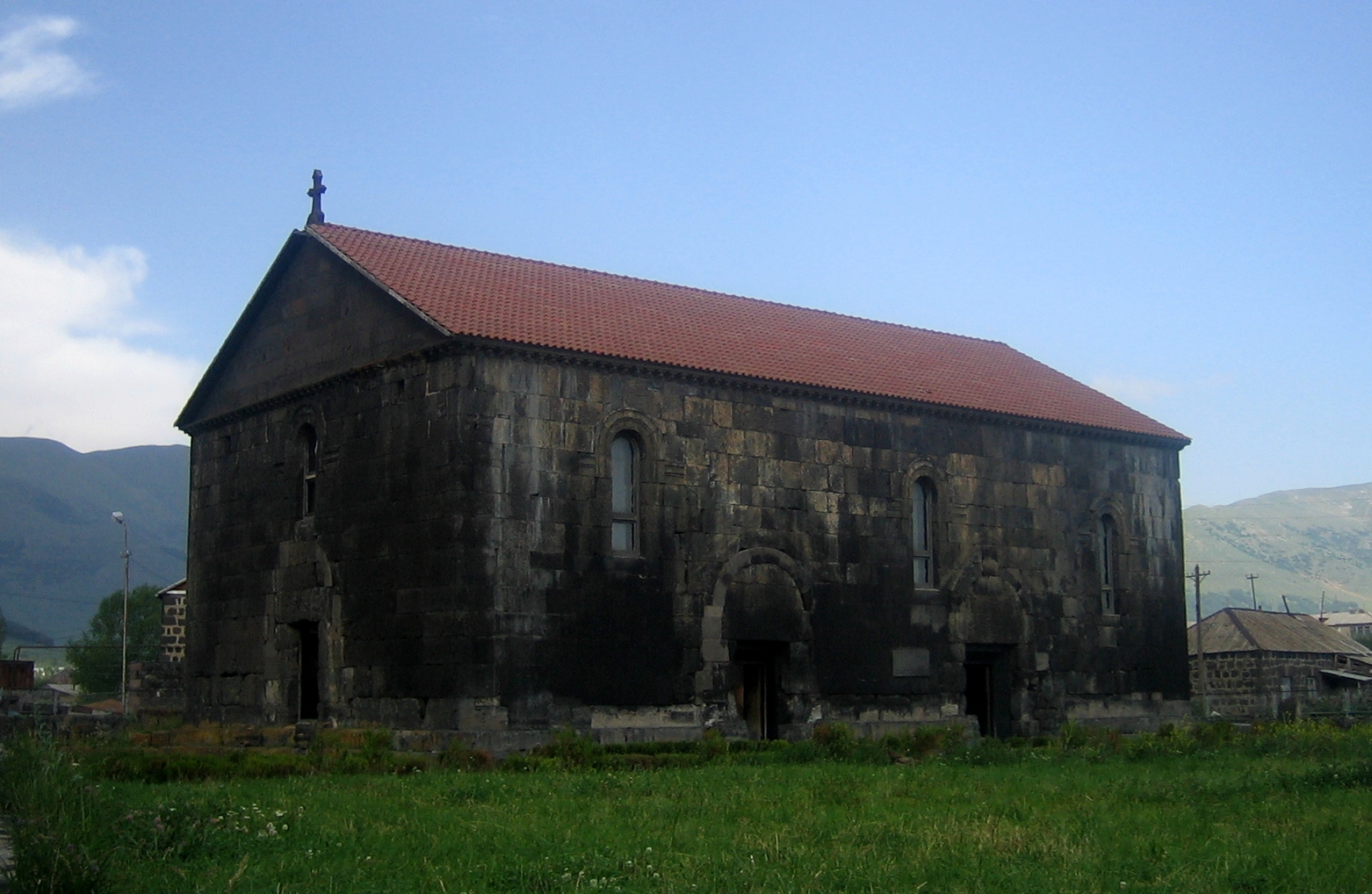
The basilica in 2008

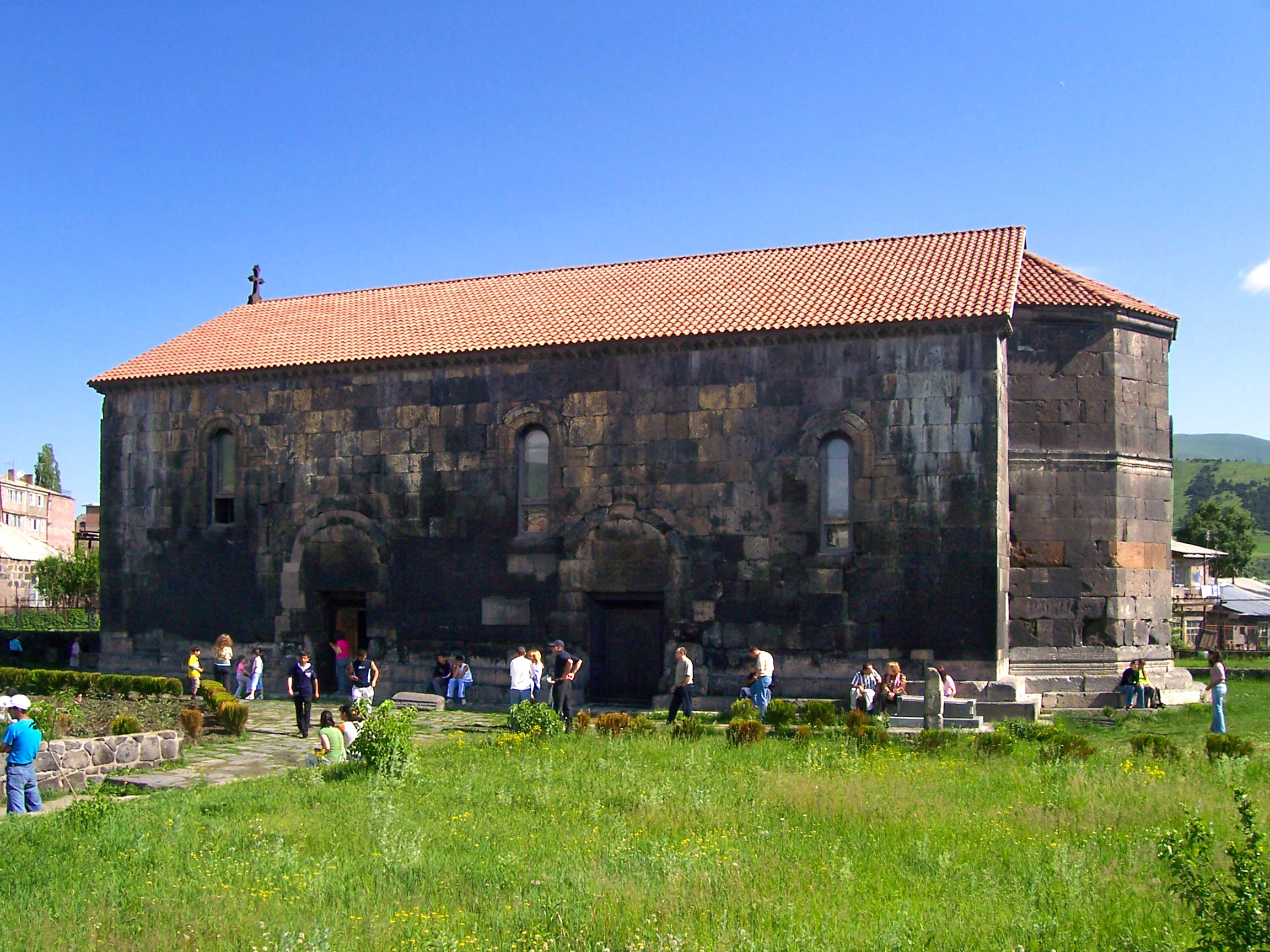
View from west side

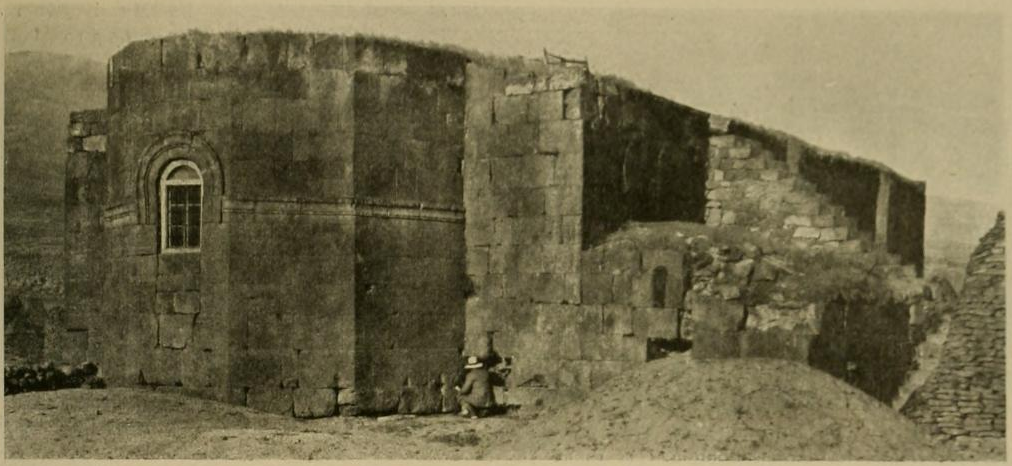
Exterior. Photo by Josef Strzygowski, 1918 or before.

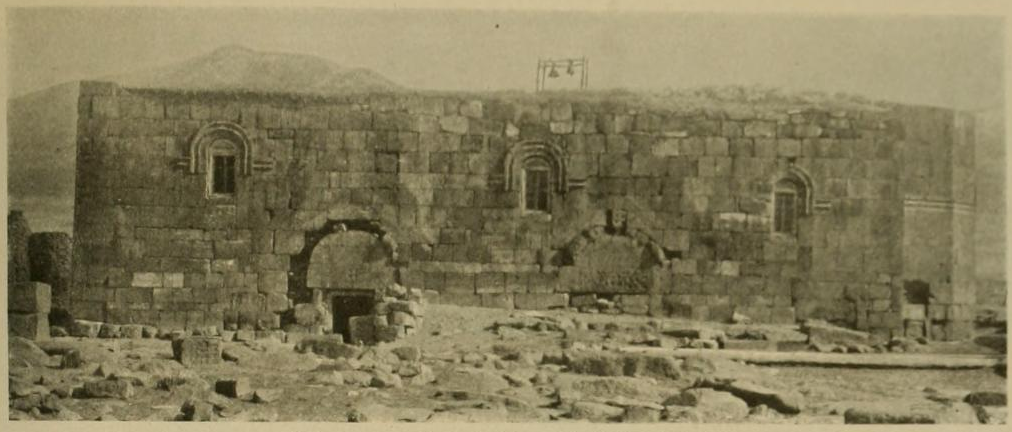
Exterior. Photo by Josef Strzygowski, 1918 or before.

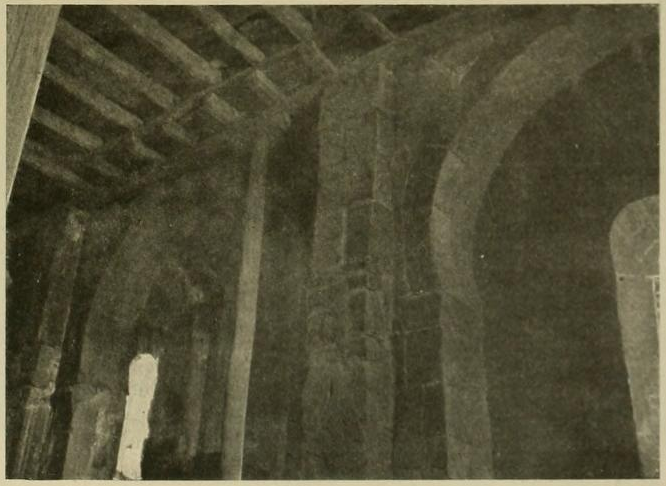
Interior. Photo by Josef Strzygowski, 1918 or before.

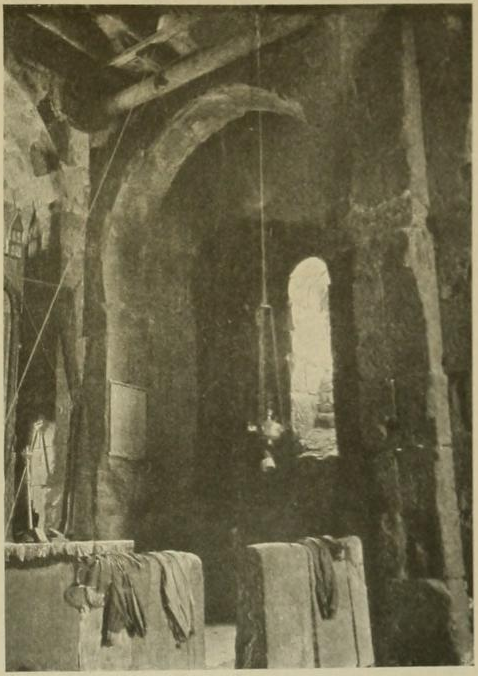
Interior. Photo by Josef Strzygowski, 1918 or before.

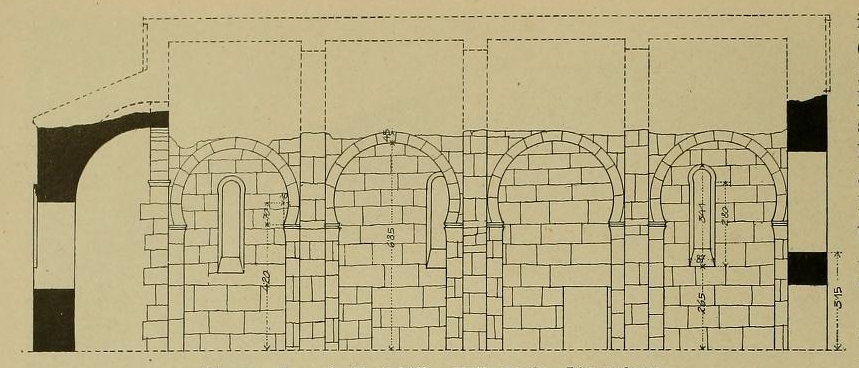
Section; by Josef Strzygowski, 1918 or before.

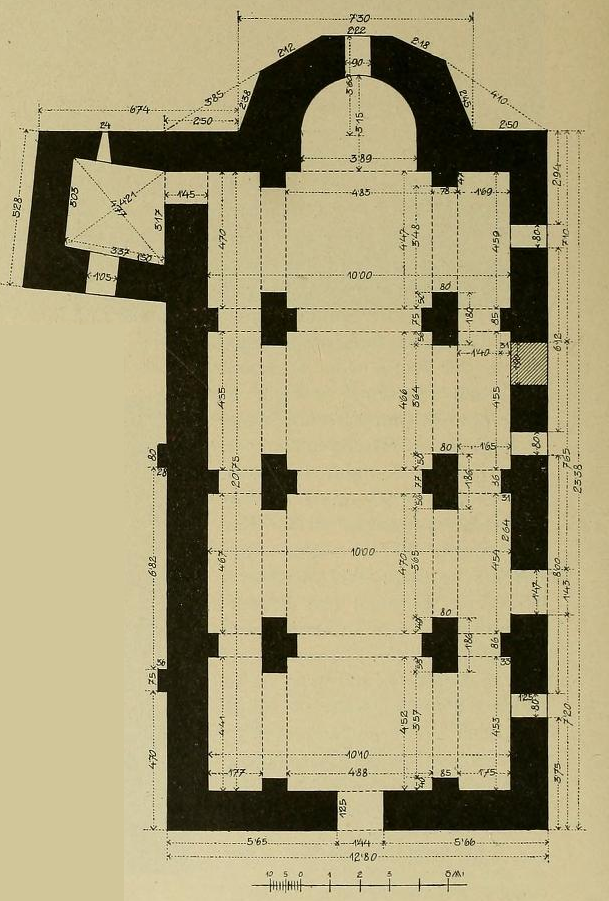
Plan; by Josef Strzygowski, 1918 or before.

== See also ==
- List of the oldest churches
