= Samshvilde =

Ruined historical city in Georgia

- სამშვილდე (Georgian)
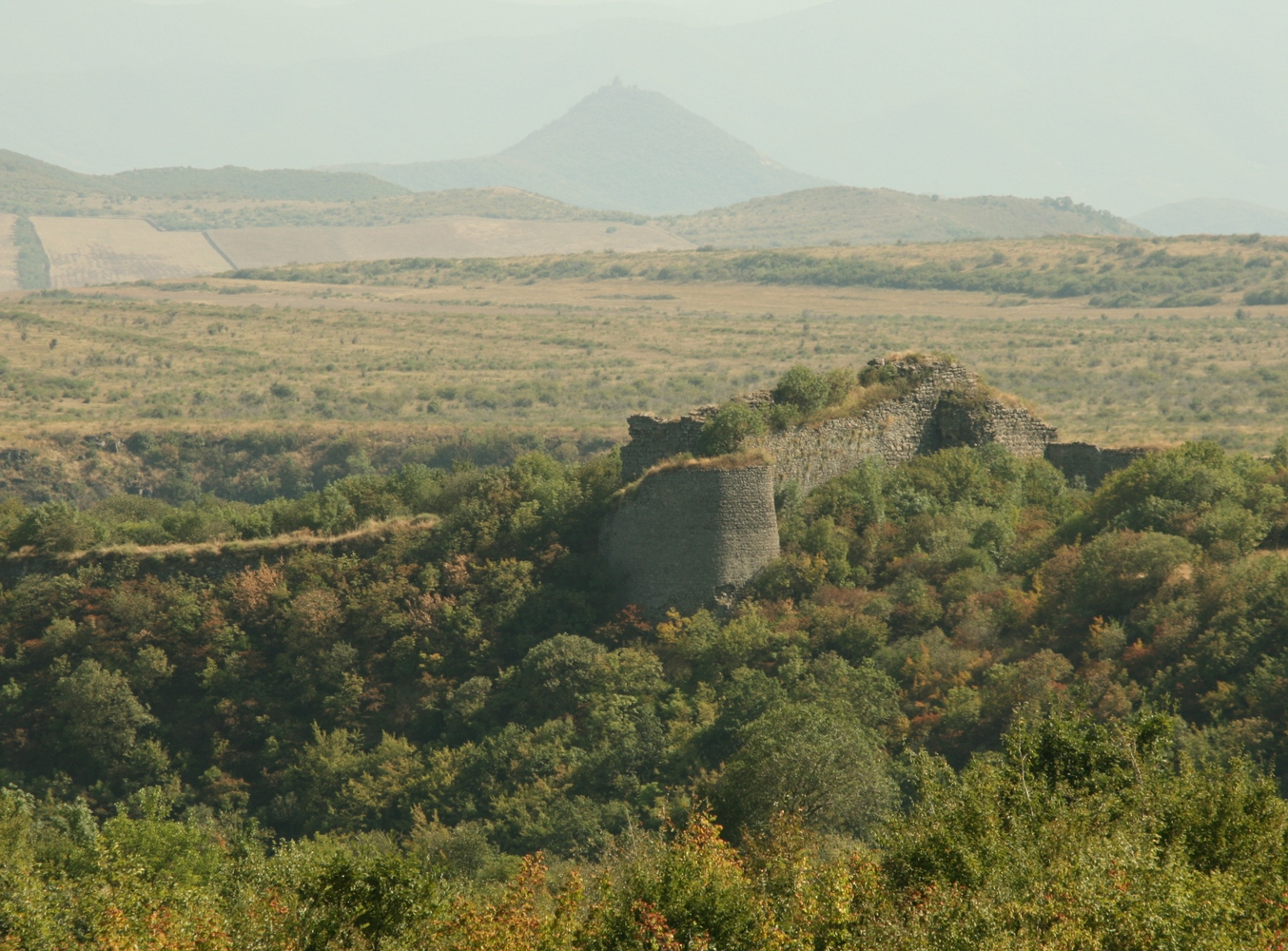
- Ruins of the Samshvilde citadel

- Location within Georgia
- 41°30′26″N 44°30′20″E
- Type: Settlement
- Periods: Early Bronze Age to Early Modern
- Location: Tetritsqaro Municipality, Kvemo Kartli, Georgia

Site notes
- Length: 2.5 m (8 ft 2 in)
- Width: 0.4 km (0.25 mi)

Samshvilde (Georgian: სამშვილდე, [samʃʷilde]) is a ruined fortified city and archaeological site in Georgia, in the country's south, near the homonymous modern-day village in the Tetritsqaro Municipality, Kvemo Kartli region. The ruins of the city, mostly medieval structures, stretch for a distance of 2.5 km in length and 400 metres (1,300 ft) in width in the Khrami river valley. Some of the most recognizable monuments are the Samshvilde Sioni church and a citadel erected on a rocky river promontory.

Samshvilde features in the medieval Georgian annals as one of the oldest cities of ancient Kartli, dating back to the 3rd century BC. In the Middle Ages, it was an important stronghold as well as a lively commercial and industrial city. Samshvilde changed hands several times. At the end of the 10th century, it became capital of the Armenian kings of Tashir-Dzoraget and was incorporated in the Kingdom of Georgia in 1064. From the mid-13th century on, as fortunes of the medieval Georgian monarchy faded, Samshvilde went into decline and was reduced to a peripheral military outpost. By the end of the 18th century, it was in ruins.

== Etymology ==
The etymology of the name of Samshvilde is first recorded by the 10th-century Armenian chronicler Hovhannes Draskhanakerttsi as meaning in Georgian "three arrows", from sami ("three") and mshvildi ("bow"). In fact, the toponym is constructed through a Georgian geographic circumfix sa⟩ ⟨e and means "[a place] of the bow".

== History ==
=== Prehistory ===
Samshvilde is centered in a naturally fortified location, a rocky terrain at the confluence of the Khrami and Chivchavi rivers, 4 km south of the town of Tetritsqaro. The 1968–1970 archaeological expedition uncovered two layers of the early Bronze Age Kura–Araxes culture at Samshvilde, in the southern slopes of Mount Karnkali, dating from the middle of the 4th millennium BC and 3rd millennium BC, respectively. This horizon included a settlement site and burial ground as well as a circular cult building. Artifacts unearthed there were the Bronze-Age pottery and various obsidian tools.

=== Antiquity ===
According to the medieval Georgian Chronicles, Samshvilde was formerly known as Orbi, a castle whose foundation was ascribed to Kartlos, the mythic ethnarch of the Georgians of Kartli, and which was found heavily fortified, but besieged and conquered by Alexander the Great during his alleged campaign in the Georgian lands. In the 3rd century BC, under the kings of Kartli, known to the Greco-Roman world as Iberia, Samshvilde became a center of one of the kingdom's subdivisions, run by eristavi ("duke"), first appointed by Parnavaz, the first in the traditional list of the kings of Kartli. King Archil (c. 411–435) gave Samshvilde in appanage to his son Mihrdat who then succeeded on the throne of Kartli. Mihrdat's Iranian wife Sagdukht, a convert to Christianity, is credited by a Georgian chronicle to have built the church of Sioni at Samshvilde.

=== Middle Ages ===
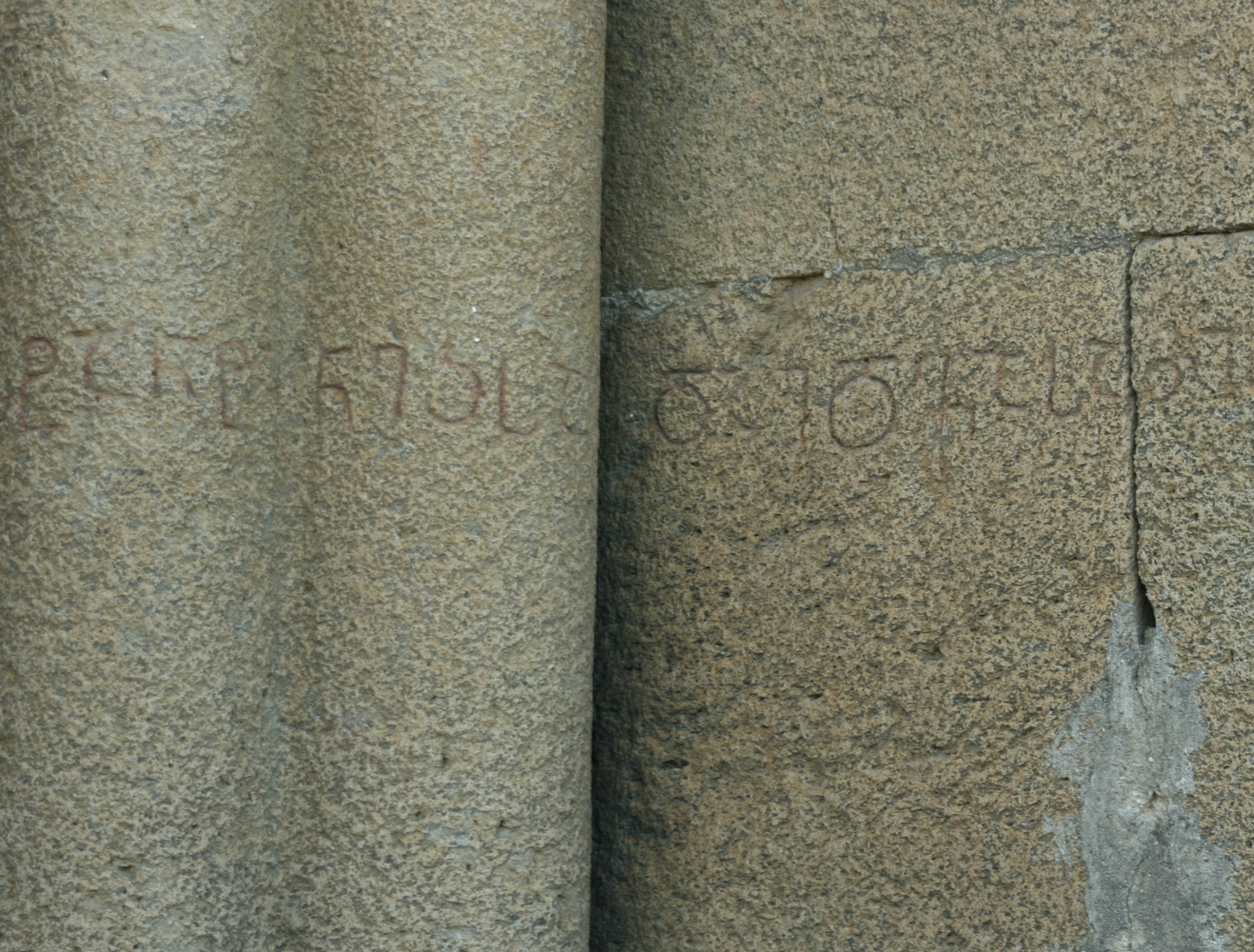
An 8th-century Georgian inscription from the Samshvilde Sioni Church

The borders of the duchy of Samshvilde fluctuated in the course of history, as the southern portion of it was frequently contested between Kartli and the neighboring kings of Armenia. The city itself remained one of the key settlements of Iberia. Along with Tbilisi and Mtskheta, Samshvilde is listed as one of the three main towns of that country in the 7th-century Armenian geography by Anania Shirakatsi. The 8th-century Georgian inscription at the Sioni church, in an asomtavruli script, makes mention of two persons of the house of pitiakhsh, an Iranian-styled local dynasts who appear to have been in possession of Samshvilde. By that time, the region around Samshvilde fell under influence of the newly established Muslim emirate, centered in Tbilisi, the former royal capital of Kartli. From this time on, Samsvhilde was contested among various Georgian, Armenian, and Muslim rulers.

Around 888, Samshvilde was occupied by the Bagratid king Smbat I of Armenia, who entrusted the town to the charge of the two brothers of the Gntuni family, Vasak and Ashot. The brothers proved to be unruly and Smbat's successor, Ashot II, had to bring them back to allegiance by force of arms c. 915. Vasak Gntuni was still recalcitrant and, c. 921, defected to the Georgian prince Gurgen II of Tao, prompting King Ashot to put the fortress under siege. As a force sent by Gurgen was entering the citadel, fighting broke out between it and Vasak's men garrisoning the fortress, who eventually let Ashot's army in. In an ensuing confrontation, Gurgen's surviving soldiers were taken captive and mutilated, while Samshvilde again submitted to the Armenian king.

In the closing decade of the 10th century, Samshvilde passed to the Kuirikids, an Armenian Bagratid collateral line of the Kingdom of Tashir-Dzoraget, who chose it as their capital. On account of this, David I, king of Tashir and Dzoraget, was referred to as Samshvildari, that is, "of Samshvilde", by a medieval Georgian author. In 1001, David revolted, unsuccessfully, from the hegemony of his uncle, King Gagik I of Armenia, who, in a three-month-long campaign, ravaged Tashir, Samshvilde, and the Plain of the Georgians (Vrac'dast), as the historian Stepanos Asoghik referred to the surrounding district.

Samshvilde served as the Kuirikid capital until a member of that dynasty, Kiurike II, was made captive by King Bagrat IV of Georgia and had to ransom himself by surrendering Samshvilde to the Georgians in 1064. Bagrat's son, George II, conceded control of the city to his powerful vassal Ivane I of Kldekari, thereby buying his loyalty, in 1073. Within a year or so, Samshvilde was conquered by the Seljuks under Malik-Shah I and remained their outpost in Georgia until 1110, when Bishop George of Chqondidi besieged and took the city on behalf of King David IV. This induced the Seljuqs to hastily evacuate most of surrounding districts. David then granted Samshvilde to his loyal commander, Ivane Orbeli, in 1123. The city remained in possession of the Orbeli clan, hereditary commanders-in-chief of the Kingdom of Georgia, until they lost it to the crown as a result of their failed revolt against George III of Georgia, in the course of which the king's loyal army stormed the fortress in 1178.

==== Decline ====
Samshvilde was attacked by the invading Mongols on their way to Tbilisi, the capital of Georgia, in 1236. In March 1440, it was sacked by Jahan Shah, leader of the Qara Qoyunlu, indignant at refusal of Alexander I of Georgia to submit to his suzerainty. According to the contemporary historian Thomas of Metsoph, Jahan Shah captured the besieged city "through deceit" on the day of Pentecost and massacred its population, building a minaret of 1,664 severed human heads at the gate of the city; sixty Christian priests, monks, and noblemen were put to death for their refusal to apostatize. Even some of those who agreed to renounce Christianity were not spared. Survivors had to seek refuge in the thick forests around Samshvilde.

The city never fully recovered from this blow and lost its past importance, save for its function as a peripheral fortress. After the final disintegration of the Kingdom of Georgia in the 1490s, it became part of the Kingdom of Kartli. In 1578, Samshvilde was occupied by the Ottoman army under Lala Mustafa Pasha during its victorious campaign in Georgia, but, in 1583, it was recovered by King Simon I of Kartli. In 1636, Rostom of Kartli granted Samshvilde in possession to his treasurer, Shiosh Khmaladze, and, in 1693, Heraclius I of Kartli bestowed it upon the Baratashvili noble family.

Samshvilde rose to relative importance in 1747, when the Muslim Georgian prince Abdullah Beg employed Lezgins mercenaries and fortified the Samshvilde fortress in his quest to challenge the hold of Kartli exercised by his Christian relative, Teimuraz II. Abdullah Beg's designs were dashed by Teimuraz's son, Heraclius, who stormed Samshvilde and made the pretender captive in 1749. The city was left in the hands of Abdullah Beg's younger brother, Husayn Beg, who, in 1751, surrendered to Heraclius II and resettled to Tbilisi.

== Monuments ==
Ruins of the Samshvilde Sioni Church as of 2012.

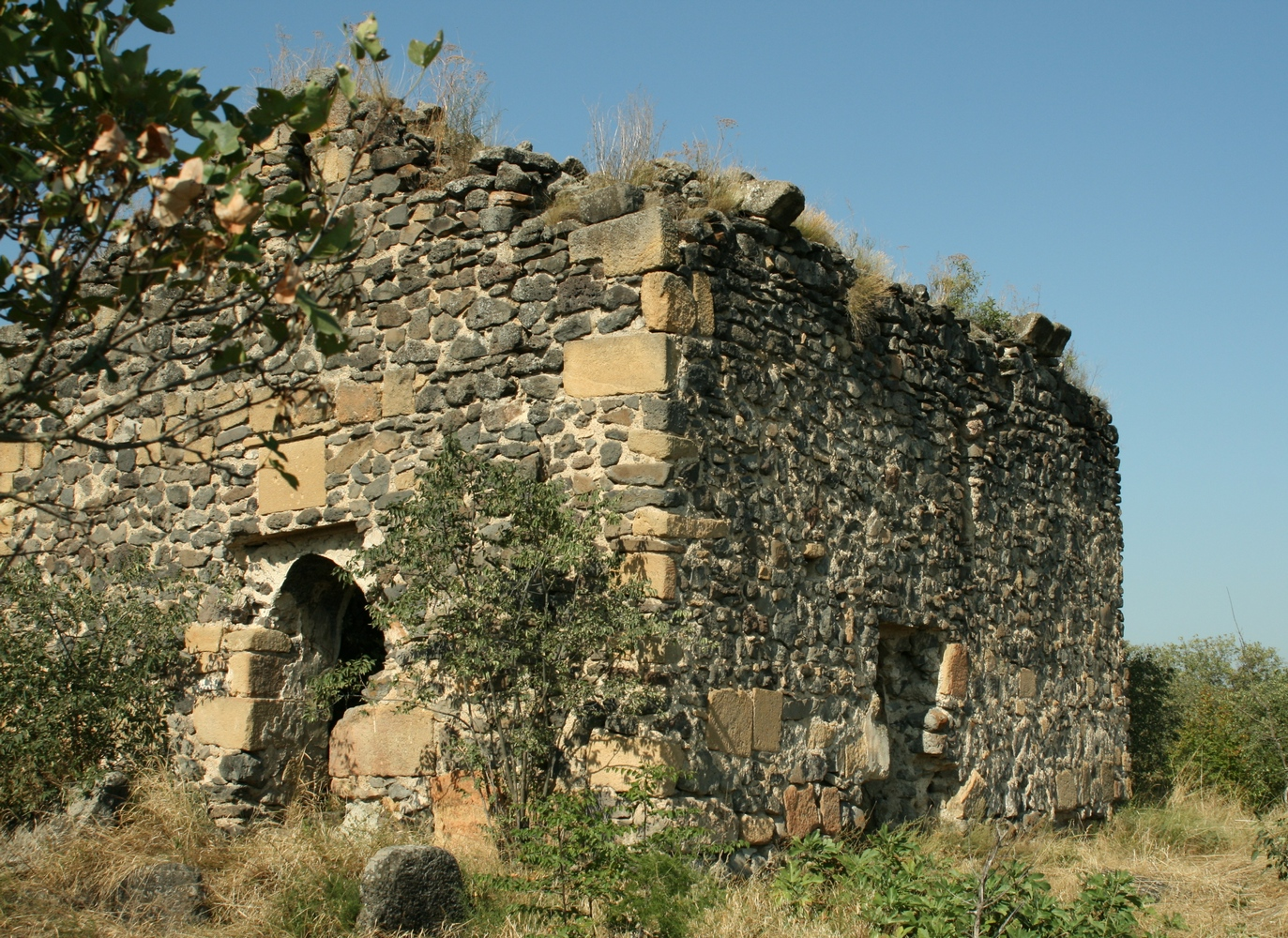
One of the ruined churches of the Samshvilde complex.

The archaeological horizon and architectural monuments of Samshvilde are inscribed on the list of the National Heritage of Georgia as the City-Site of Samshvilde (სამშვილდის ნაქალაქარი). Archaeological study of the Samshvilde area began in 1948 and systematic efforts for better conservation of the site were launched in 1978. In the 2000s, construction of major international pipelines in the region prompted new archaeological projects and discovery of new prehistoric features. Many of the late medieval and early modern structures were further studied by the Samshvilde Archaeological Expedition organized by the Tbilisi-based University of Georgia from 2012 to 2015.

The city-site occupies a nearly triangular area on a promontory at the Khrami–Chivchavi confluence and is divided into three main parts. The citadel is on the east, on a steep edge of the promontory, and the city proper lies on the west, with the walled fortress in between them. The site includes ruins of several churches, a citadel, palaces, houses, a bridge over the Chivchavi river, water cisterns, bathes, a cemetery, and other accessory structures.

A small hall-church of St. George stands in the city proper. A now-lost Georgian inscription of 1672, published by Ekvtime Takaishvili, identifies the lady called Zilikhan, a former caretaker of the wife of King Vakhtang V, as a renovator of the church.

Inside the fortress walls, stands a small stone church, that of the Dormition, which contains a large, prehistoric black menhir, sooty of candle flames, with a cross and an Armenian text mentioning the prince Smbat inscribed into it in the 11th century. The Khrami river is overlooked by another church, known as the Theogenida, probably built in the 12th or 13th century, near which a structure made of four big stones, a tetralith, is found.

The citadel consists of massive walls, towers, and three larger churches. Among these is the domed Sioni church, now in ruins, the most recognizable landmark of Samshvilde. The medieval tradition ascribes its construction to the 5th-century queen Sagdukht, but the extant edifice dates to c. 759–777 as suggested by a Georgian inscription from the better-preserved eastern façade, containing references to the contemporary Byzantine emperors Constantine V and Leo IV the Khazar. There is another, heavily damaged, almost illegible Georgian inscription in the southern façade and, next to it, a fragment in Armenian identifying the Armenian catholicos Gevorg III Loretsi (r. 1069–1072). The strict architectural forms of the Samshvilde church reveal close affinities with design of the 7th-century Tsromi church in Shida Kartli.

West to the Sioni is a three-nave basilica, probably an Armenian church, built of dark basalt stones in the 10th or 11th century. The third church is a hall-church design, with a protruding apse and a wall inscription in Georgian, mentioning King David IV (r. 1089–1125).
