= George of Chqondidi =

Georgian saint and bishop

Saint George Chqondideli
- Born: Kingdom of Georgia
- Died: 1118
- Venerated in: Eastern Orthodox Church
- Canonized: June 27, 2005 by Georgian Orthodox Church
- Feast: September 12

George of Chqondidi (Georgian: გიორგი ჭყონდიდელი, Giorgi Chqondideli) (died c. 1118) was a Georgian churchman and court minister best known as a tutor and the closest adviser of King David IV (r. 1089–1125).

He served as an archbishop of Chqondidi (Chqondideli) in west Georgia and possibly played a role in a palace coup in which George II was forced to cede power to his young and energetic son David IV, while himself was reduced to the status of a co-king. George was the tutor and spiritual father of David and was appointed by the new king as the Grand Chancellor of Georgia (Mtsignobartukhutsesi) following the ecclesiastic Council of Ruisi-Urbnisi of 1103. Henceforth this office, for a time the greatest at the Georgian court, was usually held by the incumbent archbishops of Chqondidi. George appeared as David’s key ally in his reforms of the church and state machinery. He personally supervised successful efforts at recapturing the strongholds of Samshvilde (1110) and Rustavi (1115) from the Seljuk Turks. In 1118, he accompanied the king in his travel to the Kipchak lands to negotiate a recruitment of these nomad tribesmen in the royal army of Georgia. He was never to return to Georgia though, as he died in Alania around that year. According to the Georgian Chronicles, George "was mourned as a father, and even more deeply, by the whole kingdom, and by the king himself, who wore black for forty days". And he was buried at the Gelati cathedral. The art historian Guram Abramishvili identifies George with the figure depicted on a fresco from the Ateni Sioni Church as leading a row of royal donors, otherwise thought to represent George II after his retirement to monastery.

On June 27, 2005, George of Chqondidi was canonized by the Georgian Orthodox Church which marks his feast day annually on September 12.
