= Tsromi church =

Church in Khashuri, Georgia

Tsromi church წრომის ტაძარი (in Georgian)
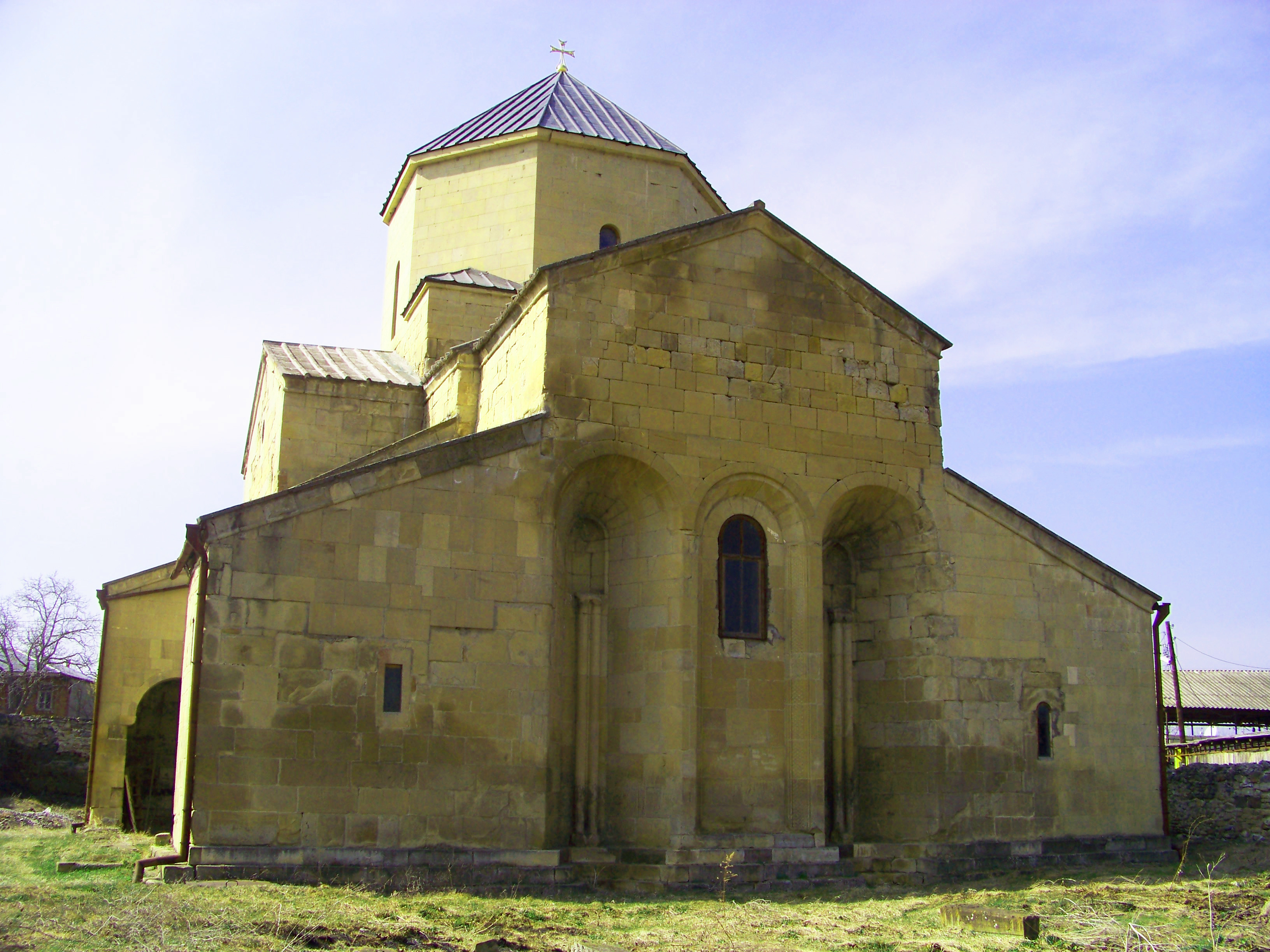
- Front view of the Tsromi church

- Location within Shida Kartli Location within Georgia

Religion
- Affiliation: Georgian Orthodox
- Province: Shida Kartli

Location
- Location: (Georgia (country)) Shida Kartli, Georgia
- Interactive map of Tsromi church წრომის ტაძარი (in Georgian)
- Coordinates: 41°59′36″N 43°44′12″E

Architecture
- Type: Church
- Completed: 7th century

The church of Tsromi (Georgian: წრომის ტაძარი)is an early medieval church in village Tsromi, in the vicinity of town Khashuri, in Shida Kartli region of Georgia. It is situated at the center of the village, along the right side of the river Mtkvari (Kura).

== History ==
According to the southern façade, the temple construction dates to the years 626–634, when it was built during the reign of Stephen II of Iberia. The monument was strongly affected and got even worse during the earthquake in 1940. Now the temple is fortified.

== Architecture ==
The domed temple represents a monument of Georgian architecture, distinguished by its complex composition. Its artistic importance is comparable with Jvari Monastery in MtskhetasaIt is the basis of the further development of Georgian church architecture of the Middle Ages.

The temple is a ″drawn-inside cross″ type; the basis of its plan is an equiangular cross. It is the first Georgian church where the dome rests on four free pillars. It also gave freedom to walls and opened new perspectives in the Georgian architecture.

The exterior is modestly decorated. The eastern facade is cut with two deep triangular niches. Such niches by the side of the apse appeared for the first time in Tsromi to later become characteristic Georgian temple decoration.

The interior is illuminated through high windows in the dome and each cross arm. The temple decoration is scant. The conch of the temple altar was decorated with contemporaneous mosaic, depicting Christ and two apostles, the reserved fragments of which are kept in the Museum of Art of Georgia since 1930s. The prothesis and the sacristy are in eastern part, on the altar sides. Each of them has cross-shaped and octangular vaults.

The stairs in the northern corner lead to the choir above the narthex, meant for nobility, women and singers.

== Literature ==
- Georgian soviet encyclopedia, volume XI, Tbilisi, 1974
- description of Georgian historical and cultural monuments, volume 5. pages:457-460; Tbilisi; 1990.
- Bedidze V, Old Georgian architecture, Tbilisi, 1974
- G. Chubinashvili, History of Georgian Arts, volume 1. Tbilisi, 1936.
- Ir. Tsitsishvili, History of Georgian architecture, Tbilisi, 1955.
