= Georgia (country) =

Country in Eastern Europe and West Asia

Georgia საქართველო Sakartvelo
- Flag Coat of arms
- Motto: ძალა ერთობაშია Dzala ertobashia "Strength is in Unity"
- Anthem: თავისუფლება Tavisupleba "Freedom"
- Location of Georgia Russian-occupied territories
- Capital and largest city: Tbilisi; 41°43′N 44°47′E
- Official languages: Georgian
- Recognized regional languages: Abkhaz (Note: In the Autonomous Republic of Abkhazia.)
- Ethnic groups (2024): 84.1% Georgians; 6.8% Azerbaijanis; 4.3% Armenians; 1.1% Russians; 3.7% other
- Religion (2024): 85.4% Christianity; 82.0% Georgian Orthodoxy; 3.4% other Christian; 11.1% Islam; 0.3% other; 0.5% none
- Demonym: Georgian
- Government: Unitary parliamentary republic
  - President: Mikheil Kavelashvili (Note: As result of the 2024 Georgian parliamentary election and the subsequent constitutional crisis, key political positions and the legitimacy of Georgia's parliament have been disputed. Opposition forces have contested the legitimacy of Kavelashvili, and the outgoing president Salome Zourabichvili has claimed to continue to be legitimate president. Also, international platforms have disputed the legitimacy of the de facto Georgian authorities after the 2024 elections, including the European Parliament.)
  - Prime Minister: Irakli Kobakhidze
- Legislature: Parliament

Establishment history
  - Colchis and Iberia: 13th c. BC – AD 580
  - Kingdom of Abkhazia and Kingdom of the Iberians: 786–1008
  - Unification of Georgia: 1008
  - The Tripartite division: 1490–1810
  - Russian annexation: 1801–1858
  - Independence from Russia: 26 May 1918
  - Russian invasion: 12 February 1921
  - Soviet annexation: 25 February 1921
  - Independence from the Soviet Union • Declared • Finalized: 9 April 1991; 26 December 1991
  - Current constitution: 24 August 1995

Area
  - Total: 69,700 km^{2} (26,900 sq mi) (119th)

Population
  - 2024 census: ▲3,657,000 (129th)
  - Density: 56.3/km^{2} (145.8/sq mi) (165th)
- GDP (PPP): 2026 estimate
  - Total: ▲$123,049 billion (98th)
  - Per capita: ▲$33,340 (67th)
- GDP (nominal): 2026 estimate
  - Total: ▲$42,716 billion (103rd)
  - Per capita: ▲$11,234 (85rd)
- Gini (2024): ▼33.9^{[a]} medium inequality
- HDI (2023): ▲0.844^{[a]} very high (57th)
- Currency: Georgian lari (₾) (GEL)
- Time zone: UTC+4 (GET)
- Date format: dd.mm.yyyy
- Calling code: +995
- ISO 3166 code: GE
- Internet TLD: .ge, .გე
- 1. Not including occupied territories

Georgia (Note: Georgian: საქართველო, romanized: sakartvelo, IPA: [sakʰartʰʷelo]) is a country in the Caucasus region on the east coast of the Black Sea. It is located at the intersection of Eastern Europe and West Asia (Note: For a more complete explanation, see: Boundaries between the continents) and is generally regarded as part of Europe. It is bordered to the north and northeast by Russia; to the west by the Black Sea, to the south by Turkey and Armenia, and to the southeast by Azerbaijan. It has a population of 3.9 million, (Note: This figure excludes Abkhazia and South Ossetia, two Russian-occupied territories of Georgia that only Russia and a small number of other countries recognize. The government of Georgia considers the two areas as integral parts of the country, with international support.) of which over a third live in Tbilisi, the capital and largest city. Georgians, who are native to the region and constitute the majority of the population, are ethno-linguistically distinct from their neighboring nations and primarily speak Georgian, a member of the small Kartvelian language family that has no relation to any other language family in the world.

Georgia has been inhabited since prehistory and is known for hosting the world's earliest known sites of winemaking. The classical era saw the emergence of several kingdoms, such as Colchis and Iberia, that formed the nucleus of the modern Georgian state. In the early 4th century, Georgians officially adopted Christianity, which contributed to their unification under the Kingdom of Georgia. Georgia reached its Golden Age during the High Middle Ages under the reigns of King David IV and his great-granddaughter Tamar. Beginning in the 15th century, the kingdom declined and disintegrated under relentless attacks from hostile empires like the Mongols, the Ottoman Empire, and Persia. Georgia requested support from the Russian Empire, which ended up gradually annexing the country starting in 1801.

After the Russian Revolution in 1917, Georgia briefly emerged as an independent republic under German protection. However, the country was invaded and annexed by the Red Army in 1921; it then became a republic of the Soviet Union. In the 1980s, an independence movement grew quickly, leading to Georgia's secession from the Soviet Union in April 1991. For much of the subsequent decade, the country endured economic crises, political instability, and secessionist wars in Abkhazia and South Ossetia. Following the peaceful Rose Revolution in 2003, Georgia strongly pursued a pro-Western foreign policy, introducing a series of reforms aimed at integration into the European Union and NATO. This Western orientation led to worsening relations with Russia, culminating in the Russo-Georgian War of 2008 and continued Russian occupation of parts of Georgia.

Georgia is a representative democracy governed as a unitary parliamentary republic. It is a developing country with a very high Human Development Index and an emerging market economy. Sweeping economic reforms since 2003 have resulted in one of the freest business climates in the world, as well as greater economic freedom and transparency. In 2018, Georgia became the second country to legalize cannabis, and the first former socialist state to do so. Georgia is a member of numerous international organizations, including the Council of Europe, Eurocontrol, BSEC, GUAM, and Energy Community. As part of the Association Trio, Georgia is an official candidate for membership in the European Union. Since October 2024, Georgia has been immersed in a deep political crisis.

== Etymology ==
=== Names of Georgia ===
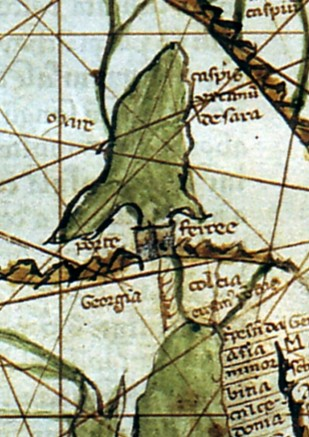
"Georgia" on a medieval mappa mundi, AD 1320

Ancient Greeks (Strabo, Herodotus, Plutarch, Homer, etc.) and Romans (Titus Livius, Tacitus, etc.) referred to early western Georgians as Colchians and eastern Georgians as Iberians (Iberoi, Ἰβηροι in some Greek sources).

The first mention of the name Georgia is in Italian on the mappa mundi of Pietro Vesconte dated 1320. At the early stage of its appearance in the Latin world, the name was often spelled Jorgia. Lore-based theories were given by traveller Jacques de Vitry, who explained the name's origin by the popularity of Saint George among Georgians, while Jean Chardin thought that Georgia came from the Greek γεωργός ('tiller of the land').

Modern scholarship generally derives the name from the Persian term Gurj (Persian: گرج), a historical ethnonym for Georgians. The ultimate origin of this term is debated, though it may be connected to gurğān, a region name meaning "land of wolves." From Persian, the term was borrowed into Byzantine Greek, Slavic, and later Western European languages. Its incorporation into their languages was also because of its similarity to Saint George. The adoption of the term in Western Europe coincided with increased contact during the Crusades and trade through Black Sea ports controlled by Genoese merchants. The association with Saint George, a popular figure in medieval Christendom, may have reinforced the exonym's appeal in Latin Europe.

The native name is Sakartvelo (საქართველო; 'land of Kartvelians'), derived from the Kartli region, recorded from the 9th century and in extended usage referring to the entire medieval Kingdom of Georgia prior to the 13th century. The Georgian circumfix sa-X-o is a standard geographic construction designating 'the area where X dwell', where X is an ethnonym. The self-designation used by ethnic Georgians is Kartvelebi (ქართველები, i.e. 'Kartvelians'), first attested in the Umm Leisun inscription found in the Old City of Jerusalem, dated to the 5th or 6th century.

The medieval Georgian Chronicles present an eponymous ancestor of the Kartvelians, Kartlos, a great-grandson of Japheth whom medieval chroniclers believed to have been the root of the local name of their kingdom. However, scholars agree that the word Kartli is derived from the Karts, a proto-Kartvelian tribe that emerged as a dominant regional group in ancient times. The name Sakartvelo (საქართველო) consists of two parts. Its root, kartvel-i (ქართველ-ი), specifies an inhabitant of Kartli, or Iberia as it is known in sources of the Eastern Roman Empire.

=== State name ===
The official name is "Georgia" per the English-language version of the Georgian Constitution, adopted in 1995. In Georgia's two official languages (Georgian and Abkhaz), the country is named საქართველო (Sakartvelo) and Қырҭтәыла (Kərttʷʼəla) respectively. Prior to the adoption of the constitution in 1995 and following the dissolution of the USSR, the country was officially called the "Republic of Georgia".

Several languages continue to use the Russian variant of the country's name, Gruzia, which the Georgian authorities have sought to replace through diplomatic campaigns. Since 2006, Israel, Japan, South Korea and Hungary officially changed their appellation of the country to variants of the English Georgia. In 2020, Lithuania became the first country in the world to adopt Sakartvelas in all official communications.

== History ==
=== Prehistory ===
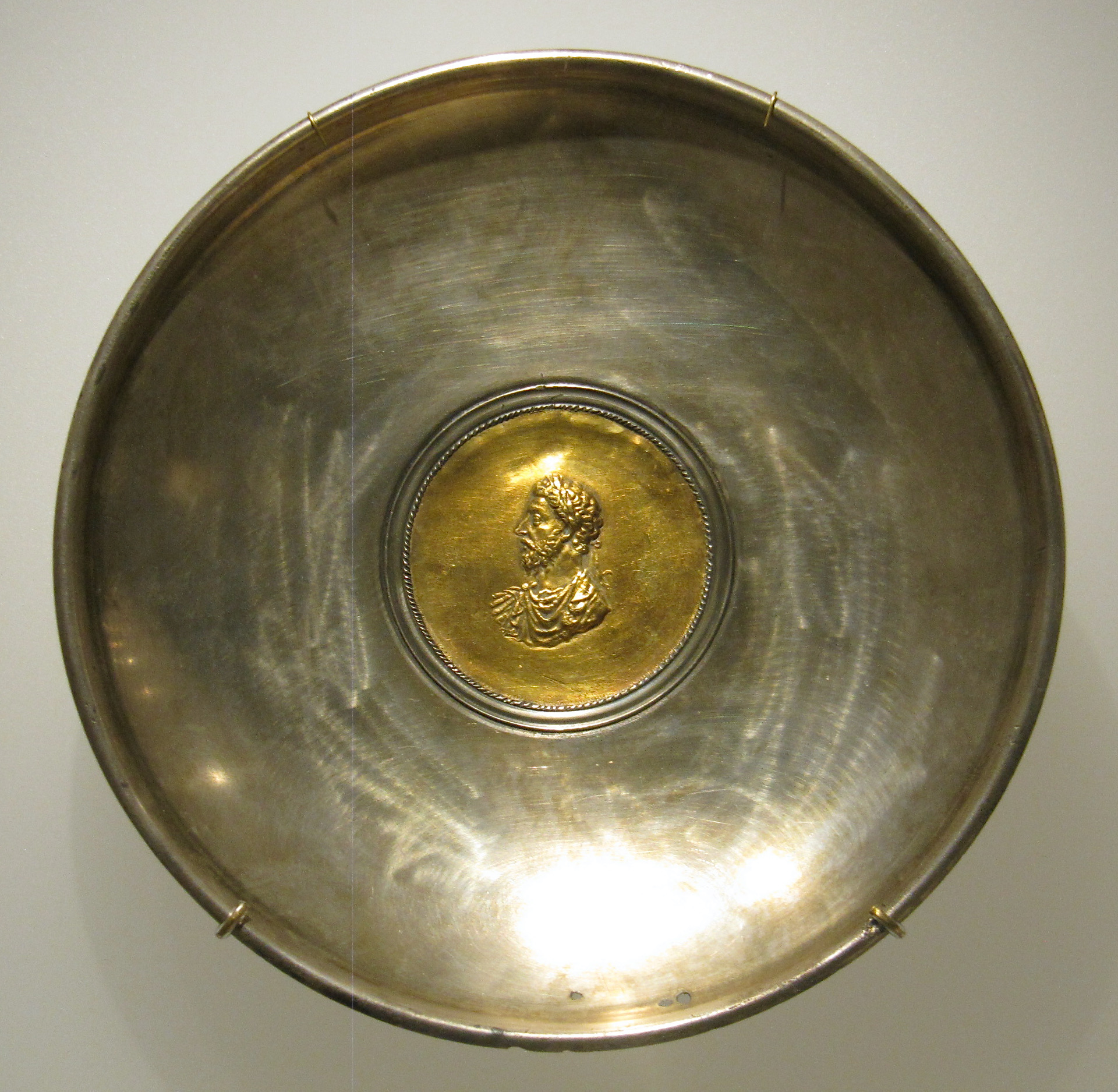
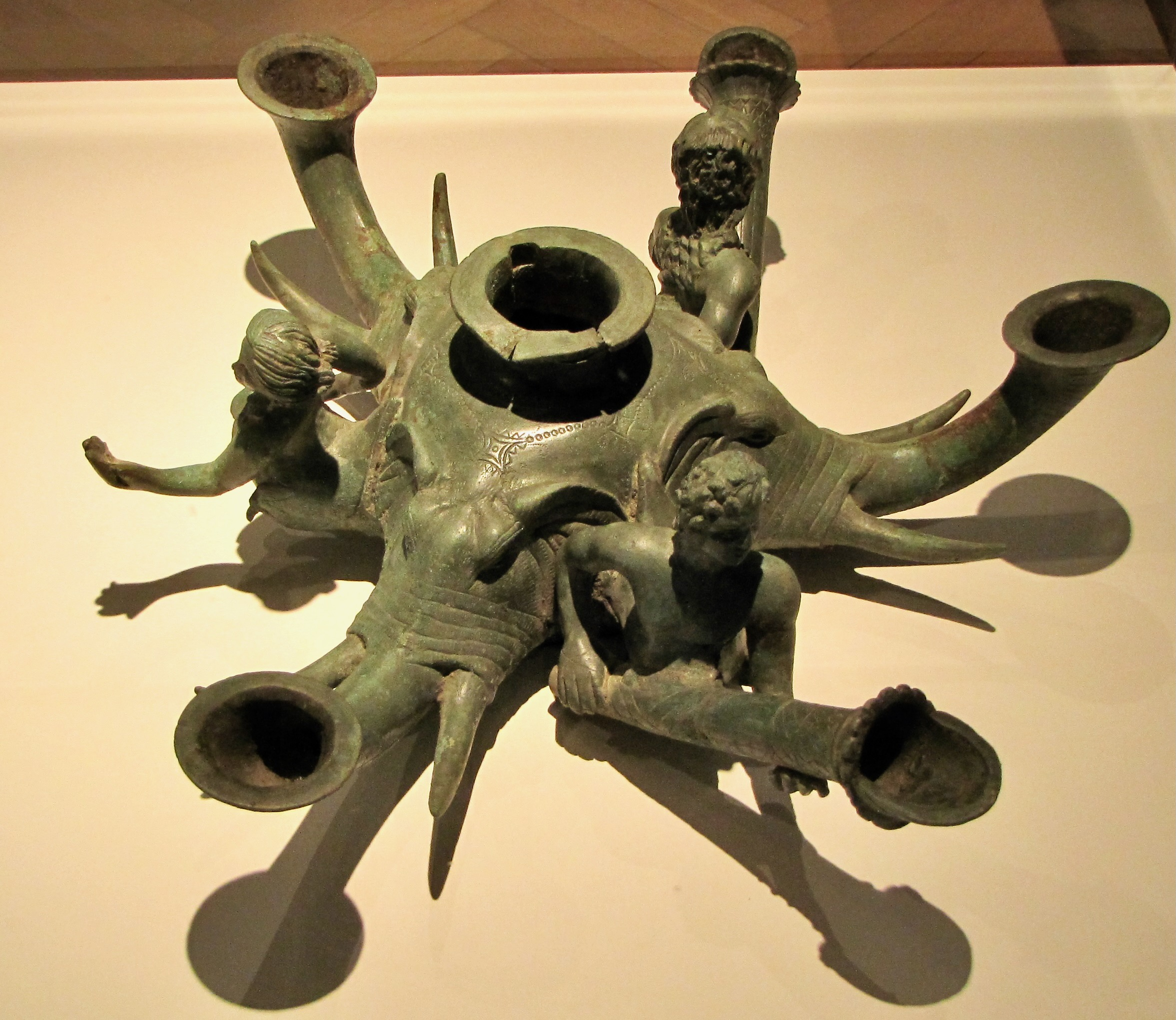
From left to right: Patera depicting Roman emperor Marcus Aurelius uncovered in Georgia, 2nd century AD. Bronze lamp featuring Heracles and Ariadne, 1st century BC, Georgian National Museum

The oldest traces of archaic humans date from approximately 1.8 million years ago in the form of the Dmanisi hominins, a subspecies of Homo erectus representing the oldest-known fossils of hominins in Eurasia. Buffered by the Caucasus and benefiting from the Black Sea ecosystem, the region seems to have served as a refugium throughout the Pleistocene, while the first continuous primitive settlements date back to the Middle Paleolithic, close to 200,000 years ago. During the Upper Paleolithic, settlements developed mostly in western Georgia, in the valleys of the Rioni and Qvirila rivers.

Signs of agriculture date back to at least the 6th millennium BC, especially in western Georgia, while the Mtkvari basin became stably populated in the 5th millennium BC, as evidenced with the rise of various cultures closely associated with the Fertile Crescent, including the Trialetian Mesolithic, the Shulaveri–Shomu culture, and the Leyla-Tepe culture. Archaeological findings show that settlements in modern-day Georgia were responsible for the first use of fibers, possibly for clothing, more than 34,000 years ago. It also hosts the earliest known sites of winemaking (dating to c. 6000 BCE) and the first signs of gold mining (3rd millennium BC).

The Kura-Araxes, Trialeti-Vanadzor, and Colchian cultures coincided with the development of proto-Kartvelian tribes that may have come from Anatolia during the expansion of the Hittite Empire, including the Mushki, Laz, and Byzeres. Some historians have suggested that the collapse of the Hittite world in the Late Bronze Age led to an expansion of the influence of these tribes to the Mediterranean Sea, notably with the Kingdom of Tabal.

=== Antiquity ===
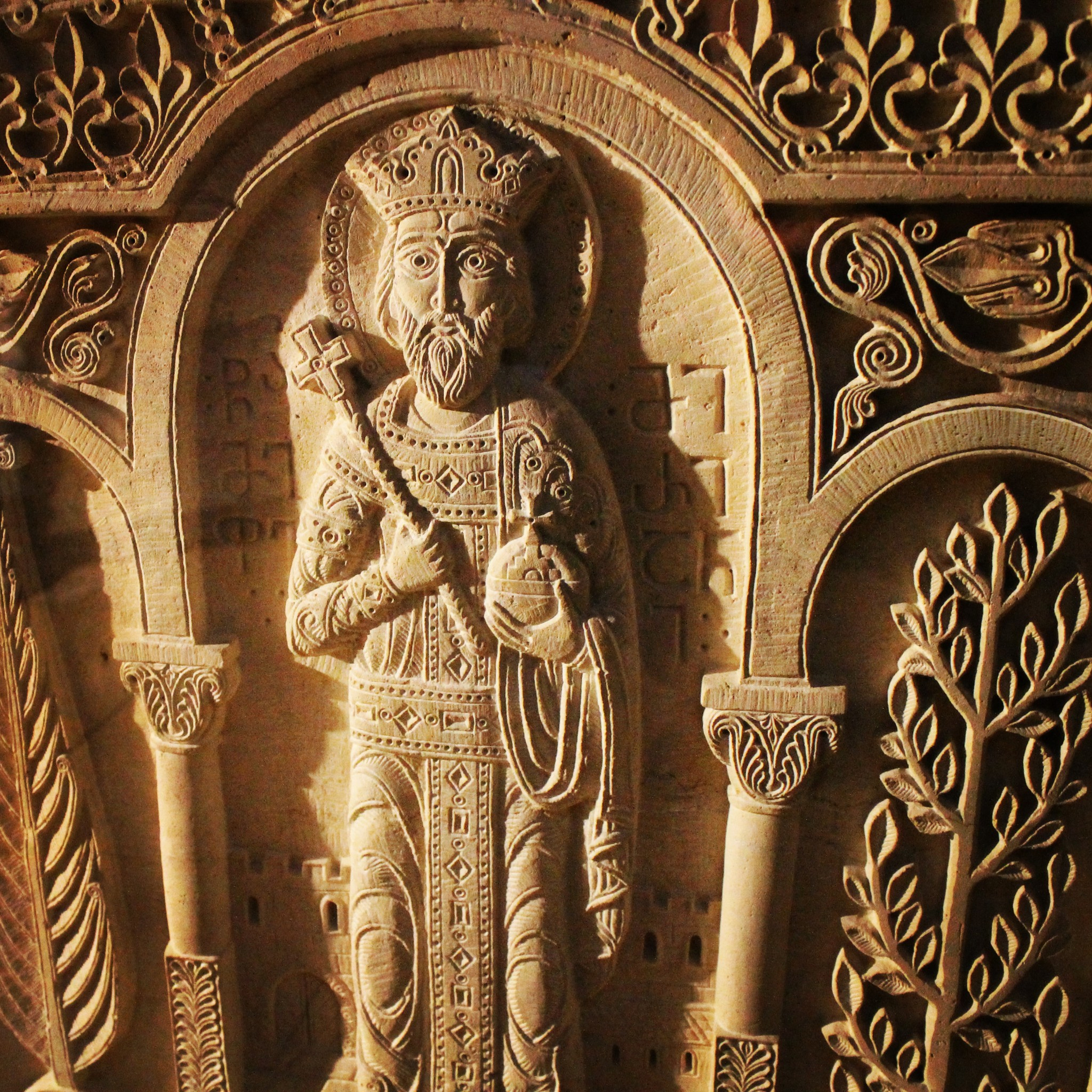
King Mirian III converted the nation to Christianity in the 4th century.

The classical period saw the rise of several Georgian states, including Colchis in western Georgia, where Greek mythology located the Golden Fleece sought after by the Argonauts. Archaeological evidence points to a wealthy kingdom in Colchis as early as the 14th century BC and an extensive trade network with Greek colonies on the eastern Black Sea shore (such as Dioscurias and Phasis). The region was annexed by the Kingdom of Pontus and then by the Roman Republic.

Eastern Georgia remained a decentralized mosaic of various clans (ruled by individual mamasakhlisi) until the 4th century BC when it was conquered by Alexander the Great, eventually leading to the creation of the Kingdom of Iberia under the protectorate of the Seleucid Empire, an early example of advanced state organization under one king and an aristocratic hierarchy. Various wars with the Roman Empire, Parthia, and Armenia made Iberia regularly change its allegiance, though it remained a Roman client state for most of its history.

In 337, King Mirian III adopted Christianity as the state religion of Iberia, beginning the Christianization of the Western Caucasus region and solidly anchoring it in Rome's sphere of influence by abandoning the ancient Georgian polytheistic religion heavily influenced by Zoroastrianism. However, the Peace of Acilisene in 384 formalized the Sasanian control over the entire Caucasus, though Christian rulers of Iberia sought to rebel at times, leading to devastating wars in the 5th–6th centuries, most famously under the rule of King Vakhtang I who expanded Iberia to its largest historical extent by capturing all of western Georgia and building his capital at Tbilisi.

=== Medieval unification ===
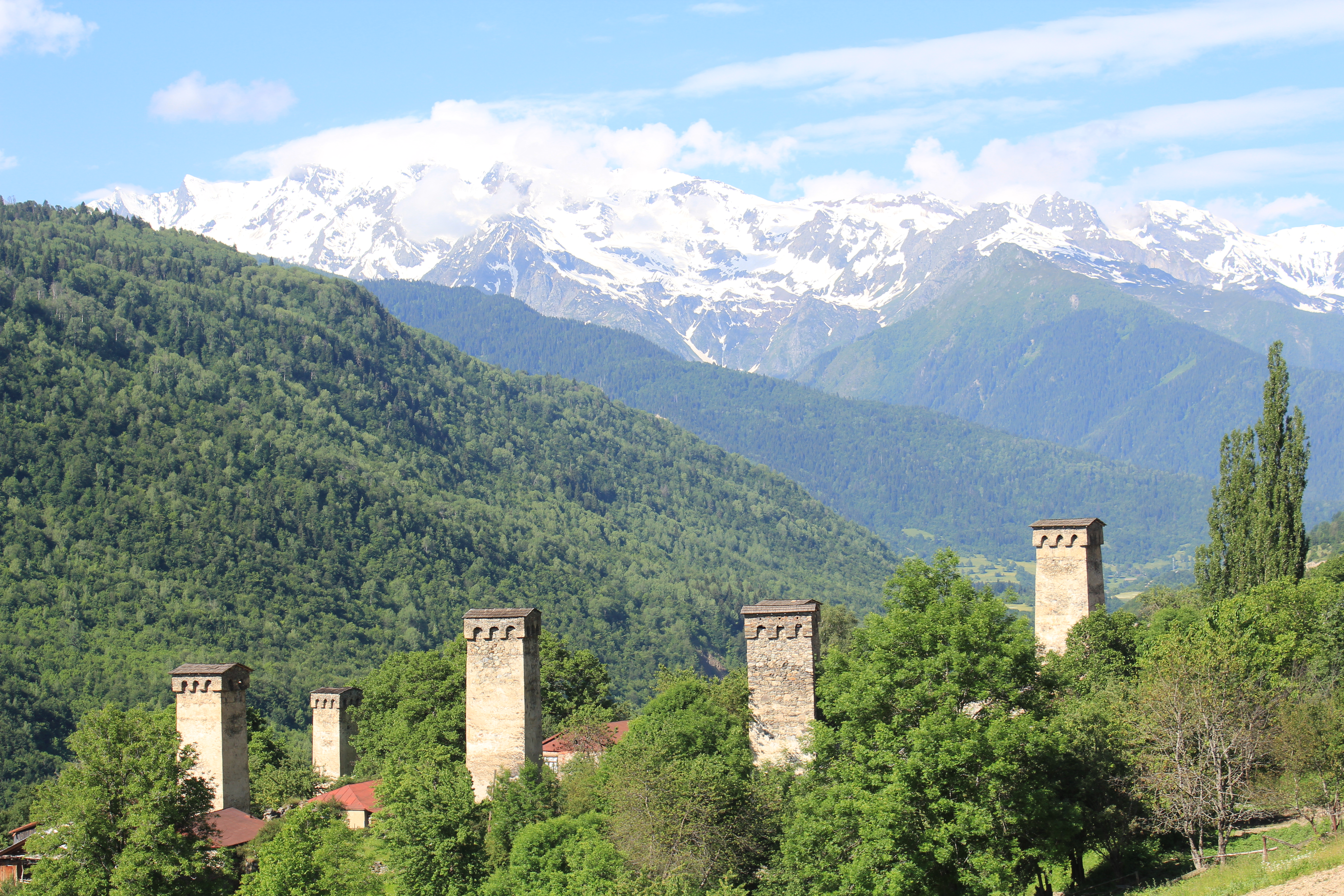
Northwestern Georgia is home to the medieval towers of Ushguli and Mestia.

In 580, the Sasanian Empire abolished the Kingdom of Iberia, leading to the disintegration of its constituent territories into various feudal regions by the early Middle Ages. The Roman–Persian wars plunged the region into chaos, with both Persia and Constantinople supporting various warring factions in the Caucasus, however, the Byzantine Empire was able to establish control over Georgian territories by the end of the 6th century, ruling Iberia indirectly through a local Kouropalates.

In 645, the Arabs invaded southeastern Georgia, starting an extended period of Muslim domination in the region; this also led to the establishment of several feudal states seeking independence from each other, such as the Emirate of Tbilisi and the Principality of Kakheti. Western Georgia remained mostly a Byzantine protectorate, especially following the Lazic War.

Gelati Monastery, a UNESCO World Heritage Site

The lack of a central government allowed the rise of the Bagrationi dynasty in the early 9th century. Consolidating lands in the southwestern region of Tao-Klarjeti, Prince Ashot I (813–830) used infighting between Arab governors to expand his influence to Iberia and was recognized as Presiding Prince of Iberia by both the Abbasid Caliphate and the Byzantine Empire. Though Ashot's descendants formed competing princely lines, Adarnase IV managed to unify most Georgian lands (except for Kakheti and Abkhazia) and was crowned King of the Iberians in 888, restoring the monarchy that had been abolished three centuries prior.

In western Georgia, the Kingdom of Abkhazia benefited from the weakening of Byzantium in the region to unify various tribes and become one of the most powerful states of the Caucasus in the 8th century. In the 9th and 10th centuries, Abkhazia grew its influence through several military campaigns and came to control much of Iberia and competing with the Bagrationi. Dynastic conflicts weakened Abkhazia in the second half of the 10th century while in Tao-Klarjeti, Prince David III used his influence within Byzantine Anatolia to empower the Bagrationi. Bagrat III, heir of the Bagrationi dynasty, successively became King of Abkhazia (978), Prince of Tao-Klarjeti (1000), and King of the Iberians (1008), allowing him to unify most Georgian feudal states and be crowned in 1010 as King of Georgia.

14th century Georgian frescoes

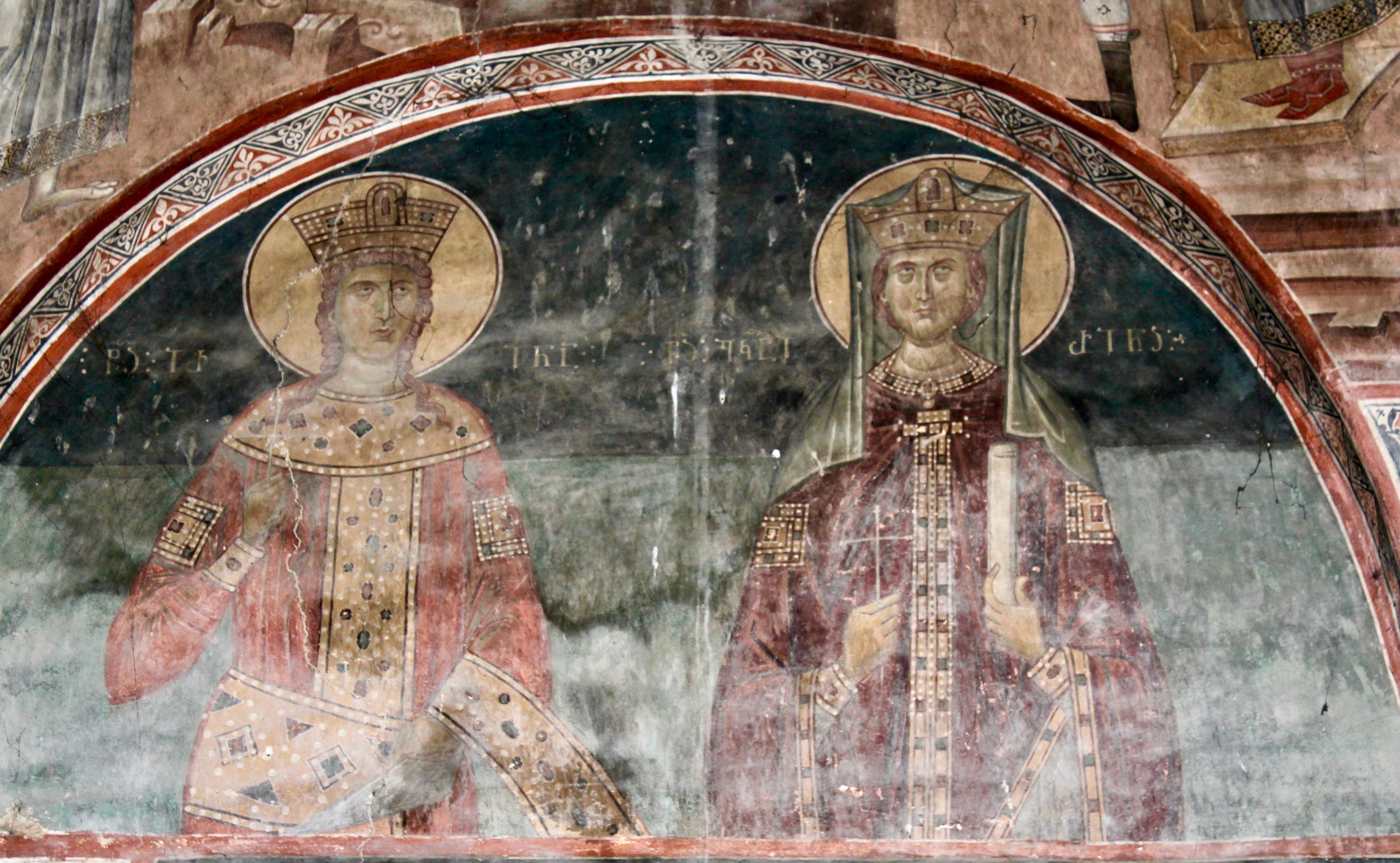
Medieval monarchs of Georgia

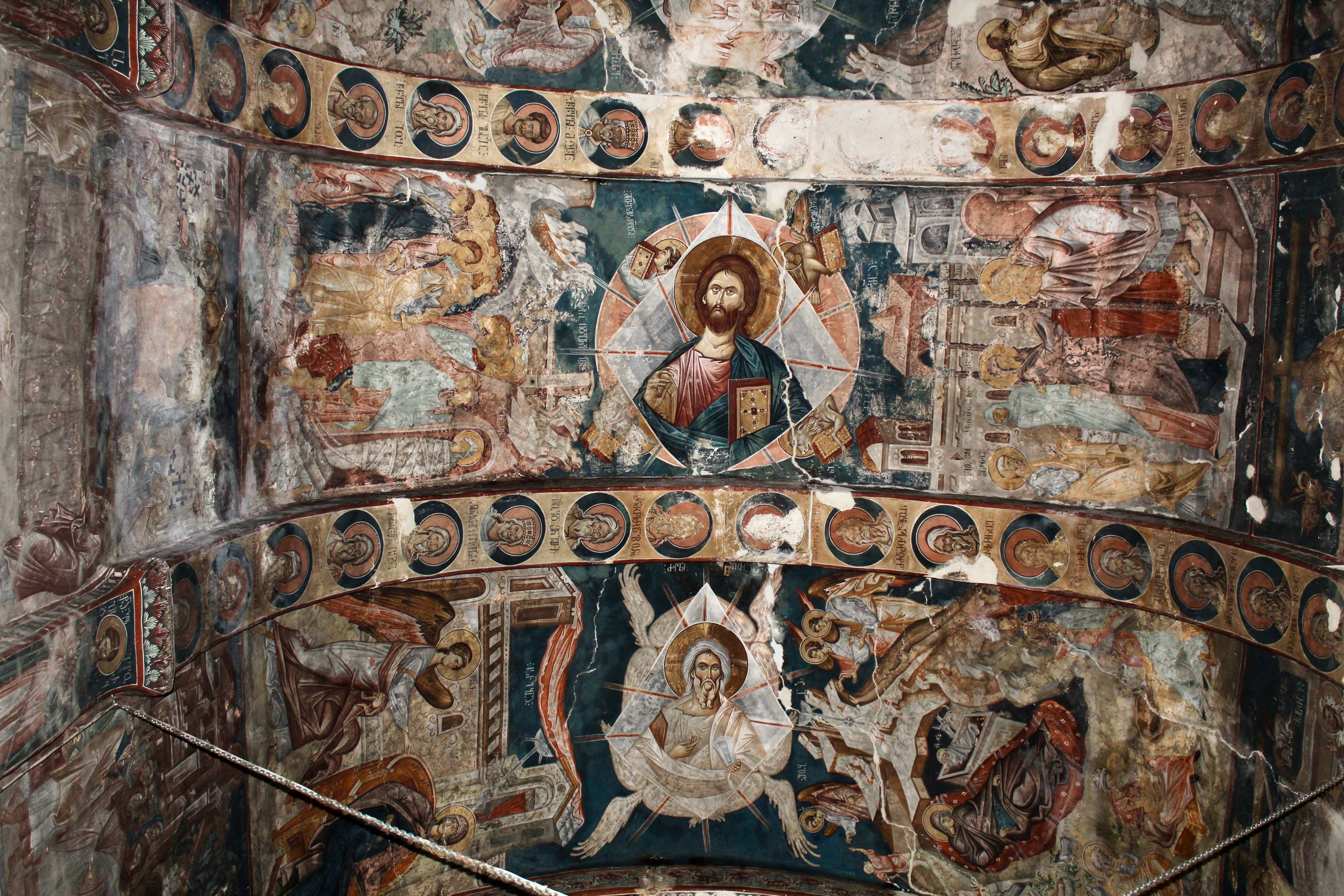
Depiction of the Holy Trinity painted by Damiane.

=== Golden Age and division ===
For much of the 11th century, the nascent Georgian kingdom experienced geopolitical and internal difficulties, with various noble factions opposed to the centralization of the Georgian state. They were often backed by the Byzantine Empire, which feared a dominion of the Caucasus region by the Bagrationi dynasty, and in some instances fuelled internal conflict through aristocratic families seeking more power. However, ties between Byzantium and Georgia were normalized when the two countries faced a new common enemy, the rising Seljuk Empire in the 1060s. Following the decisive Byzantine defeat at the Battle of Manzikert in 1071, Constantinople started to retreat from eastern Anatolia and entrusted Georgia with its administration, placing Georgia at the forefront of war with the Turks in the 1080s.

The Kingdom of Georgia reached its zenith in the 12th to early 13th centuries. This period during the reigns of David IV (r. 1089–1125) and his great-granddaughter Tamar (r. 1184–1213) has been widely termed as the Georgian Golden Age. This early Georgian renaissance, which preceded its Western European analog, was characterized by impressive military victories, territorial expansion, and a cultural renaissance in architecture, literature, philosophy and the sciences. The Golden Age of Georgia left a legacy of great cathedrals, romantic poetry and literature, and the epic poem The Knight in the Panther's Skin, considered a national epic.

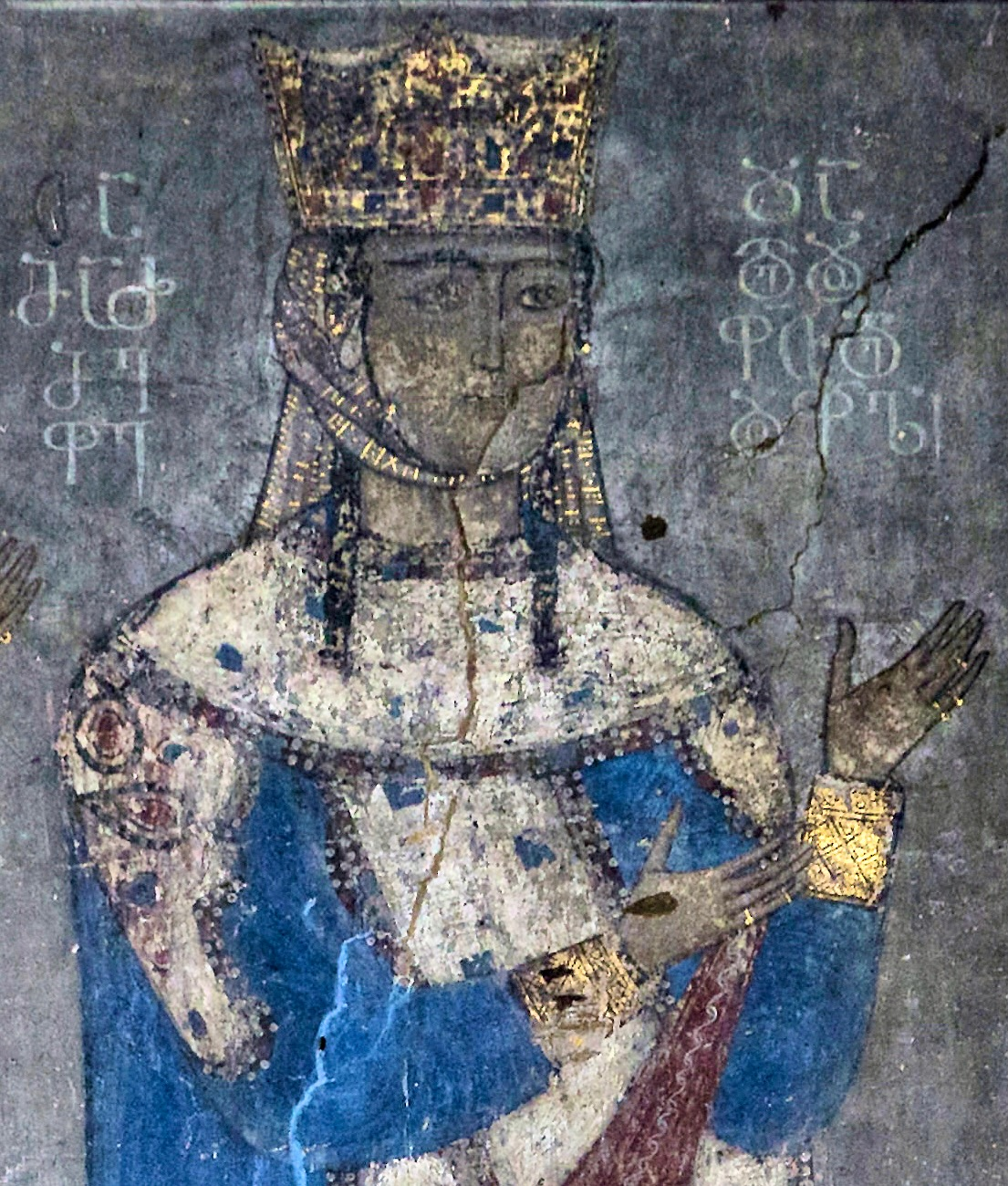
Queen Tamar, the first woman to rule Georgia.

David IV suppressed dissent of feudal lords and centralized power in his hands to effectively deal with foreign threats. In 1121, he decisively defeated much larger Turkish armies during the Battle of Didgori and abolished the Emirate of Tbilisi. The 29-year reign of Tamar, the first female ruler of Georgia, is considered the most successful in Georgian history. Tamar was given the title "king of kings" and succeeded in neutralizing her opposition while embarking on an energetic foreign policy aided by the downfall of the rival powers of the Seljuks and Byzantium. Supported by a powerful military elite, Tamar was able to build on the successes of her predecessors to consolidate an empire that dominated the Caucasus, and extended over large parts of present-day Azerbaijan, Armenia, eastern Turkey, and northern Iran, and used the vacuum of power left by the Fourth Crusade to create the Empire of Trebizond as a Georgian vassal state.

The revival of the Kingdom of Georgia was set back after Tbilisi was captured and destroyed by the Khwarezmian leader Jalal ad-Din in 1226, followed by devastating invasions by Mongol ruler Genghis Khan. The Mongols were expelled by George V the Brilliant (r. 1299–1302), known for reuniting eastern and western Georgia and restoring the country's previous strength and Christian culture. After his death, local rulers fought for their independence from central Georgian rule, until the total disintegration of the kingdom in the 15th century. Georgia was further weakened by several disastrous invasions by Mongols under Timur. Invasions continued, giving the kingdom no time for restoration, with both Qara Qoyunlu and Aq Qoyunlu Turkomans constantly raiding its southern provinces.

=== Tripartite division ===
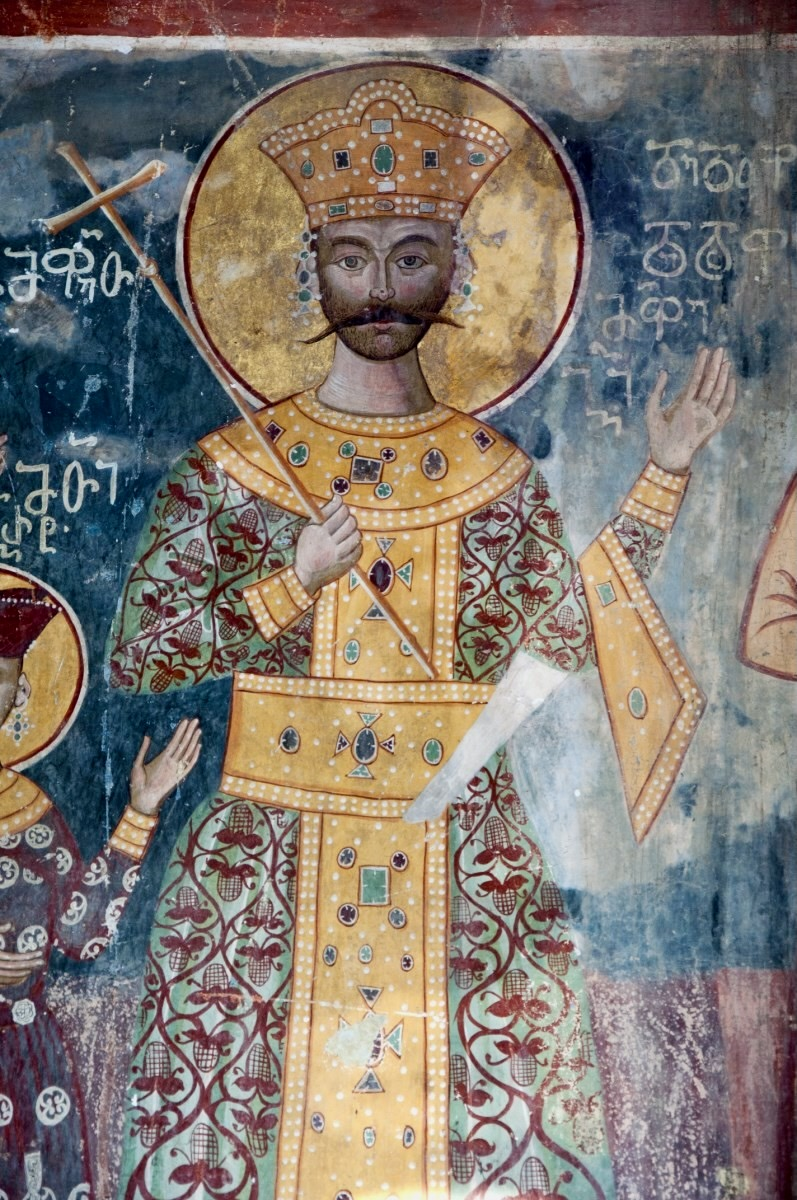
King George II faced feudal warfare and Ottoman invasions.

The Kingdom of Georgia collapsed into anarchy by 1466 and fragmented into three independent kingdoms and five semi-independent principalities. Neighbouring large empires subsequently exploited the internal division of the weakened country, and beginning in the 16th century, various Ottoman and Iranian forces subjugated western and eastern regions of Georgia, respectively. This pushed local Georgian rulers to seek closer ties with Russia. In 1649, the Kingdom of Imereti sent ambassadors to the Russian royal court, with Russia returning the favour in 1651. In the presence of these ambassadors, Alexander III of Imereti swore an oath of allegiance to Tsar Alexis of Russia on behalf of Imereti. Subsequent rulers also sought assistance from Pope Innocent XII but without success.

The rulers of regions that remained partly autonomous organized rebellions on various occasions. As a result of incessant Ottoman–Persian Wars and deportations, the population of Georgia dwindled to 784,700 inhabitants at the end of the 18th century. Eastern Georgia, composed of the regions of Kartli and Kakheti, had been under Iranian suzerainty since the Peace of Amasya signed with neighbouring rivalling Ottoman Turkey (Safavid Georgia). With the death of Nader Shah in 1747, both kingdoms broke free and were reunified through a personal union under the energetic king Heraclius II, who succeeded in stabilizing Eastern Georgia to a degree.

In 1783, Russia and the eastern Georgian Kingdom of Kartli-Kakheti signed the Treaty of Georgievsk, which made eastern Georgia a protectorate of Russia, guaranteed its territorial integrity and the continuation of its reigning Bagrationi dynasty in return for prerogatives in the conduct of Georgian foreign affairs.

Despite its commitment to defend Georgia, Russia rendered no assistance when the Iranians invaded in 1795, capturing and sacking Tbilisi and massacring its inhabitants. Although Russia initiated a punitive campaign against Persia in 1796, the Russian Imperial authorities subsequently violated key promises of the Georgievsk Treaty and in 1801 proceeded to annex eastern Georgia, while abolishing the Georgian royal Bagrationi dynasty, as well as the autocephaly of the Georgian Orthodox Church. Pyotr Bagration, one of the descendants of the abolished house of Bagrationi, later joined the Russian army and became a prominent general in the Napoleonic wars.

=== Within the Russian Empire ===
On 22 December 1800, Tsar Paul I of Russia, at the alleged request of the Georgian King George XII, signed the proclamation on the incorporation of Georgia (Kartli-Kakheti) within the Russian Empire, which was finalized by a decree on 8 January 1801, and confirmed by Tsar Alexander I on 12 September 1801. The Bagrationi royal family was deported from the kingdom. The Georgian envoy in Saint Petersburg reacted with a note of protest that was presented to the Russian vice-chancellor, Prince Kurakin.

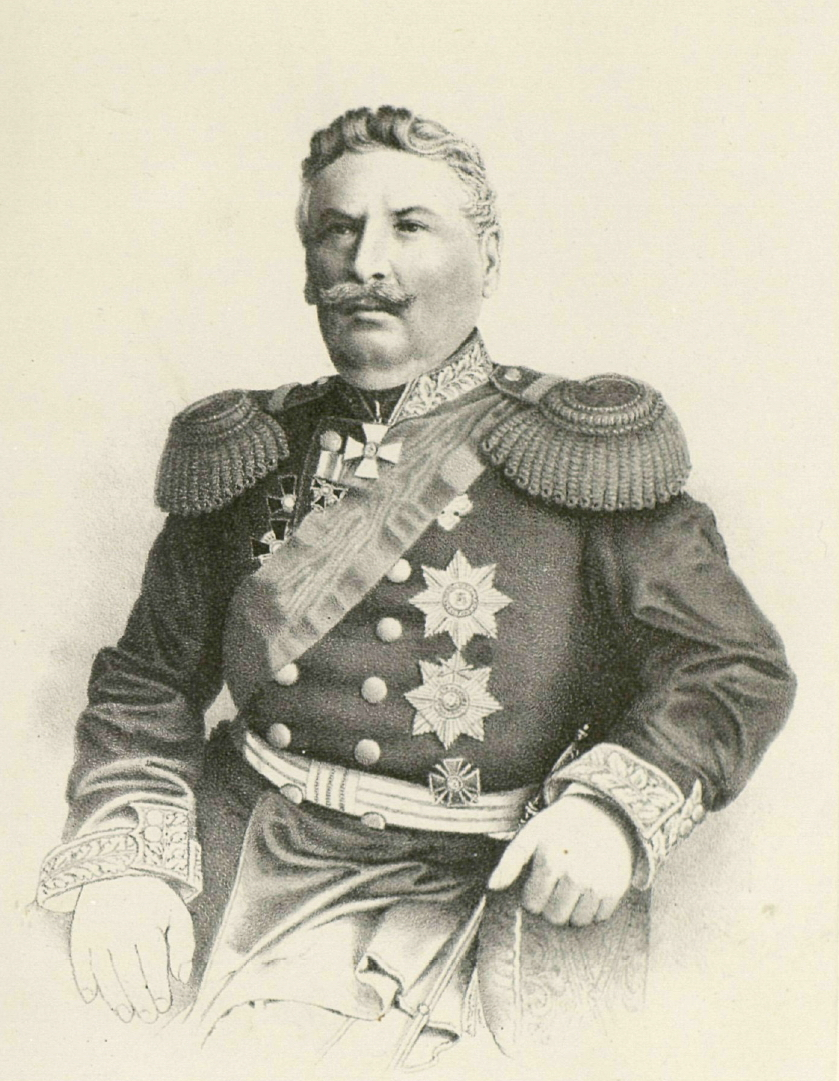
During the Russian Empire, numerous Georgians, like Ivane Andronikashvili, rose high in the imperial army ranks.

In May 1801, under the oversight of General Carl Heinrich von Knorring, Imperial Russia transferred power in eastern Georgia to the government headed by General Ivan Petrovich Lazarev. The Georgian nobility did not accept the decree until 12 April 1802, when Knorring assembled the nobility at the Sioni Cathedral and forced them to take an oath on the Imperial Crown of Russia. Those who disagreed were temporarily arrested.

In the summer of 1805, Russian troops on the Askerani River near Zagam defeated the Iranian army during the 1804–13 Russo-Persian War and saved Tbilisi from reconquest now that it was officially part of the Imperial territories. Russian suzerainty over eastern Georgia was officially finalized with Iran in 1813 following the Treaty of Gulistan. Following the annexation of eastern Georgia, the western Georgian kingdom of Imereti was annexed by Tsar Alexander I. The last Imeretian king and the last Georgian Bagrationi ruler, Solomon II, died in exile in 1815, after attempts to rally people against Russia and to enlist foreign support against the latter, had been in vain.

During the Russo-Turkish Wars, numerous Georgians commanded Russian armies against the Turks, including Ivane Andronikashvili, Ivane Jambakurian-Orbeliani, and Ivane Bagration of Mukhrani. As result of these military campaigns against the Ottoman Empire, from 1803 to 1878 several of Georgia's historic territories previously lost to the Turks – such as Adjara – were recovered and also incorporated into the Russian Empire. The principality of Guria was abolished and incorporated in 1829, while Svaneti was gradually annexed in 1858. Mingrelia, although a Russian protectorate since 1803, was not absorbed until 1867.

Russian rule offered the Georgians security from external threats, but it was also often heavy-handed and insensitive. By the late 19th century, discontent with the Russian authorities grew into a national revival movement led by Ilia Chavchavadze. This period also brought social and economic change to Georgia, with new social classes emerging: the emancipation of the serfs freed many peasants but did little to alleviate their poverty; the growth of capitalism created an urban working class in Georgia. Both peasants and workers found expression for their discontent through revolts and strikes, culminating in the Revolution of 1905. The following years were marked by episodes of instability, with notable events like the 1906 Dusheti treasury heist conducted by Georgian nationalists and the subsequent 1907 Tiflis bank robbery organized by the Bolsheviks.

=== Declaration of independence ===
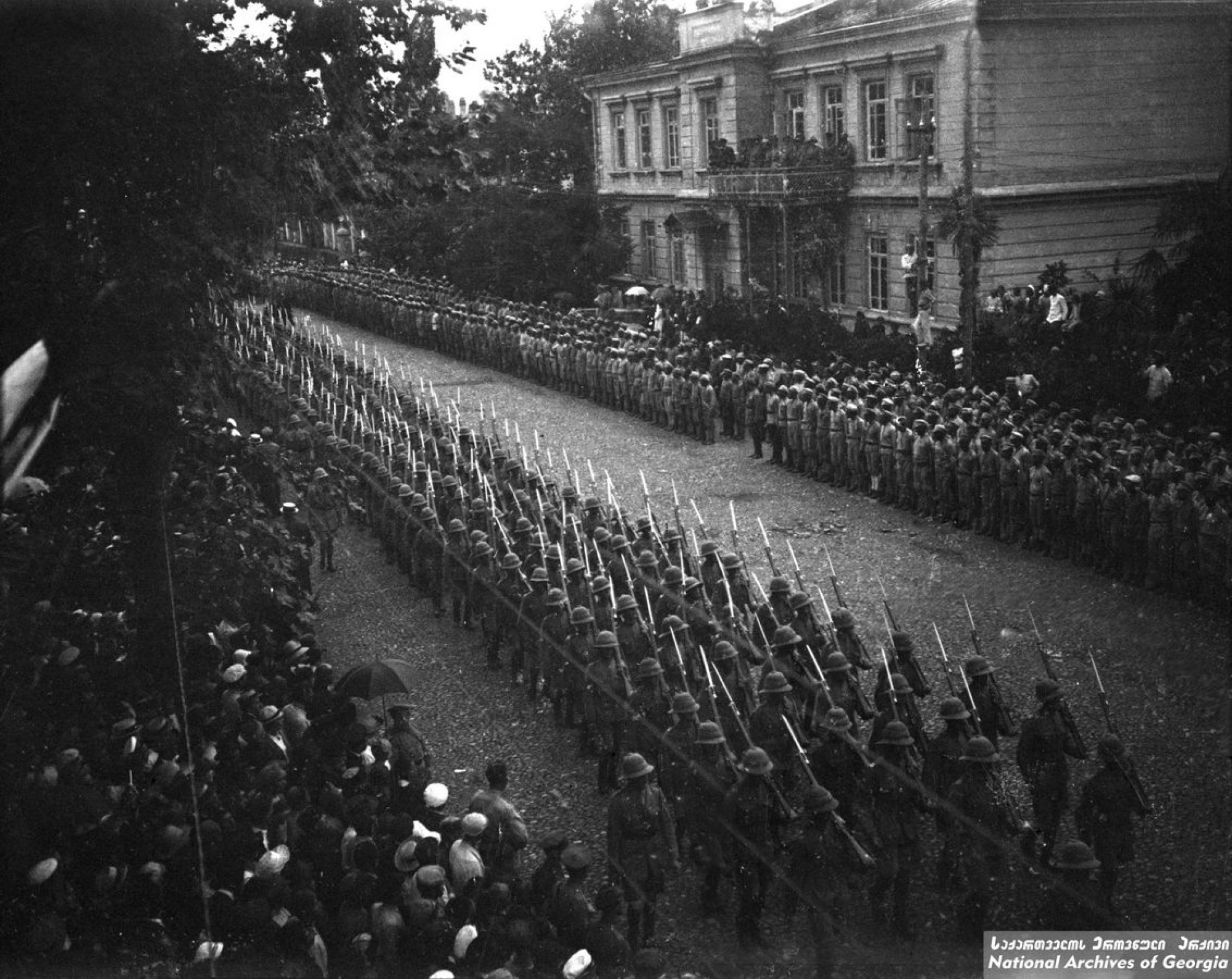
British troops marching in Batumi, Georgia, in 1920. Following World War I, Britain replaced German troops in Georgia.

After the Russian Revolution of 1917, the Transcaucasian Democratic Federative Republic was established with Nikolay Chkheidze acting as its president. This weak and short-lived federation also included neighbouring Armenia and Azerbaijan. However, Georgians were not content with this cohabitation, and because of irreconcilable foreign policy differences Georgia declared independence on 26 May 1918, becoming an ally of the German Empire.

Most Georgians were not supportive of Bolsheviks due to their penchant for violence and disregard for human life. Consequently, the Menshevik Social Democratic Party of Georgia won the parliamentary election and its leader, Noe Zhordania, became prime minister, with Nikolay Chkheidze as parliamentary president. Despite the subsequent Soviet takeover, Zhordania continued to be recognized as the legitimate head of the Georgian Government by France, UK, Belgium, and Poland through the 1930s.

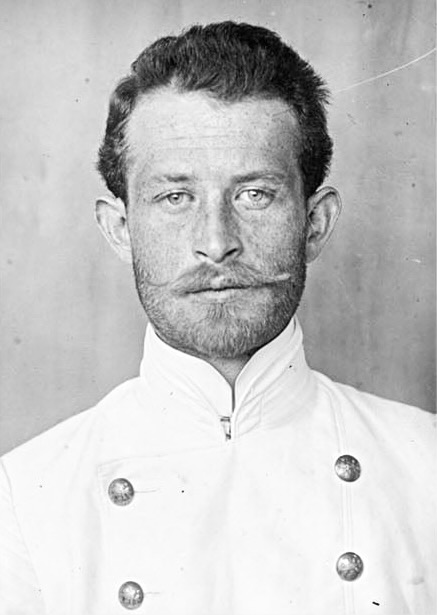
Samson Dadiani, one of the drafters of the original Georgian constitution, among the world's most progressive at the time

The 1918 Georgian–Armenian War, which erupted over parts of disputed provinces between Armenia and Georgia populated mostly by Armenians, ended because of British intervention. In 1918–1919, Georgian general Giorgi Mazniashvili led an attack against the White Army led by Moiseev and Denikin to claim the Black Sea coastline from Tuapse to Sochi and Adler for independent Georgia.

In 1920 Soviet Russia recognized Georgia's independence with the Treaty of Moscow but the Russians effectively discarded this treaty only a year later, when the Red Army attacked Georgia in 1921 and formally annexed it into the Soviet Union in 1922.

Although short-lived, the Democratic Republic of Georgia continues to be an inspiration for contemporary Georgia due to its legacy of democracy and pluralism. The legal and constitutional order of the first republic was considered highly progressive in its time and received international praise. DRG was one of the first countries in Europe to grant women the right to vote as enshrined in the Georgian constitution, which was "unusual in most European constitutions at the time". Several women of varying backgrounds were elected to the Georgian parliament.

=== Soviet Socialist Republic ===
In February 1921, during the Russian Civil War, the Red Army advanced into Georgia and brought the local Bolsheviks to power. The Georgian army was defeated, and the Social Democratic government fled the country. On 25 February 1921, the Red Army entered Tbilisi and established a government of workers' and peasants' soviets with Filipp Makharadze as acting head of state. Georgia was incorporated into what would soon become the Soviet Union. Soviet rule was firmly established only after local insurrections were defeated. Georgia would remain an unindustrialized periphery of the USSR until the first five-year plan (1928–1932), when it became a major centre for textile goods.

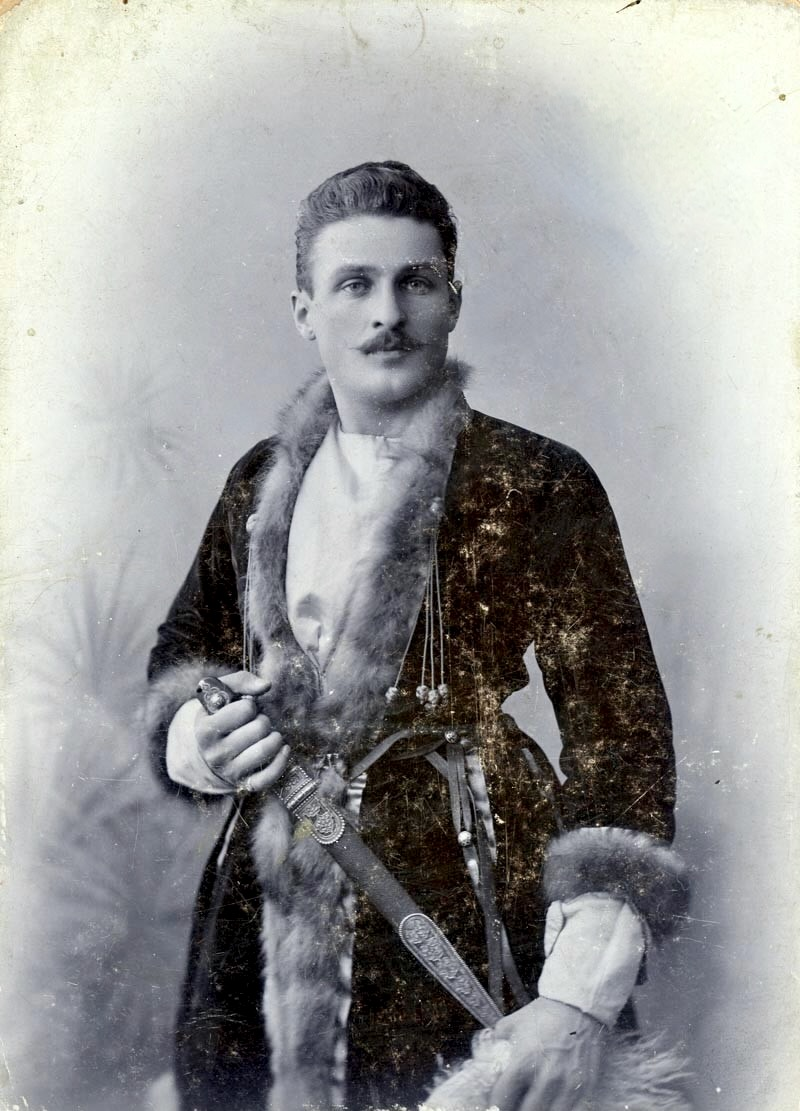
Georgian nationalist and anti-Soviet campaigner Leo Kereselidze was among those forced into exile by Bolshevik takeover

Joseph Stalin, an ethnic Georgian, was prominent among the Bolsheviks, ultimately becoming the de facto leader of the Soviet Union from 1924 until his death on 5 March 1953. Fellow Georgians such as Lavrentiy Beria and Vsevolod Merkulov likewise held powerful positions in the Soviet government. Stalin's Great Purge between 1936 and 1938 led to thousands of Georgian dissidents, intellectuals, and other presumed threats to Soviet authority being executed or sent to Gulag penal labor camps, severely truncating the nation's cultural and intellectual life.

During World War II, Germany led an Axis invasion of the Soviet Union in June 1941 with the aim of conquering all territory up to the Ural Mountains. As the initial operation stalled, the Axis launched the Fall Blau offensive in 1942 to take control of strategic Caucasian oil fields and munitions factories; ultimately, Axis troops were stopped before reaching Georgian borders. Over 700,000 Georgians—constituting about 20 percent of the population—fought in the Red Army to repel the invaders and advance towards Berlin; an estimated 350,000 were killed.

After Stalin's death, Nikita Khrushchev became the leader of the Soviet Union and implemented a policy of de-Stalinization. Khrushchev's purges were met with riots in Tbilisi that had to be dispersed by military force. This violent turn of events that compromised Georgian loyalty to the Soviet Union contributed to the nation's consolidation. 1978 Georgian demonstrations saw the return of mass anti-Soviet protests, but this time government backed down.

Throughout the remainder of the Soviet period, Georgia's economy continued to grow and experience significant improvement, though it increasingly exhibited blatant corruption and alienation of the government from the people. With the beginning of perestroika in 1986, the Georgian Soviet leadership proved so incapable of handling the changes that most Georgians, including rank and file communists, concluded that the only way forward was a break from the existing Soviet system.

=== Independence, civil wars ===
Georgian Civil War and the War in Abkhazia in August–October 1993

Starting in 1988, mass protests erupted in Georgia in favour of independence, led by Georgian nationalists such as Merab Kostava and Zviad Gamsakhurdia. The following year, the brutal suppression by Soviet forces of a large peaceful demonstration held in Tbilisi on 4–9 April 1989 proved to be a pivotal event in discrediting the continuation of Soviet rule over the country.

In October 1990, the first multi-party elections were held in Soviet Georgia, which were the first multi-party elections in the entire Soviet Union, in which the opposition groups were registered as formal political parties. The Round Table—Free Georgia coalition led by Zviad Gamsakhurdia secured victory in this election and formed a new government. On 9 April 1991, shortly before the collapse of the Soviet Union, the Supreme Council of Georgia declared independence after a referendum held on 31 March. Georgia was the first non-Baltic republic of the Soviet Union to officially declare independence, with Romania becoming the first country to recognize Georgia in August 1991. On 26 May, Gamsakhurdia was elected president in the first presidential election with 86.5% of the vote on a turnout of over 83%.

Gamsakhurdia was soon deposed in a bloody coup d'état, from 22 December 1991 to 6 January 1992. The coup was instigated by part of the National Guard and a paramilitary organization called "Mkhedrioni" ("horsemen"). The country then became embroiled in a bitter civil war, which lasted until December 1993. Simmering disputes within two regions of Georgia, Abkhazia and South Ossetia, between local separatists and the majority Georgian populations, erupted into widespread inter-ethnic violence and wars. Supported by Russia, Abkhazia and South Ossetia achieved de facto independence from Georgia, with Georgia retaining control only in small areas of the disputed territories. Eduard Shevardnadze (Soviet Minister of Foreign Affairs from 1985 to 1991) was named as the head of Georgia's new government in March 1992 and was elected as head of state in that year's elections, later as president in 1995.

During the War in Abkhazia (1992–1993), roughly 230,000 to 250,000 Georgians were expelled from Abkhazia by Abkhaz separatists and North Caucasian militants (including Chechens). Around 23,000 Georgians fled South Ossetia.

In 1994, Georgia was facing an economic crisis, with severe shortages of basics such as bread, water, electricity and heat.

=== Rose revolution and UNM government ===
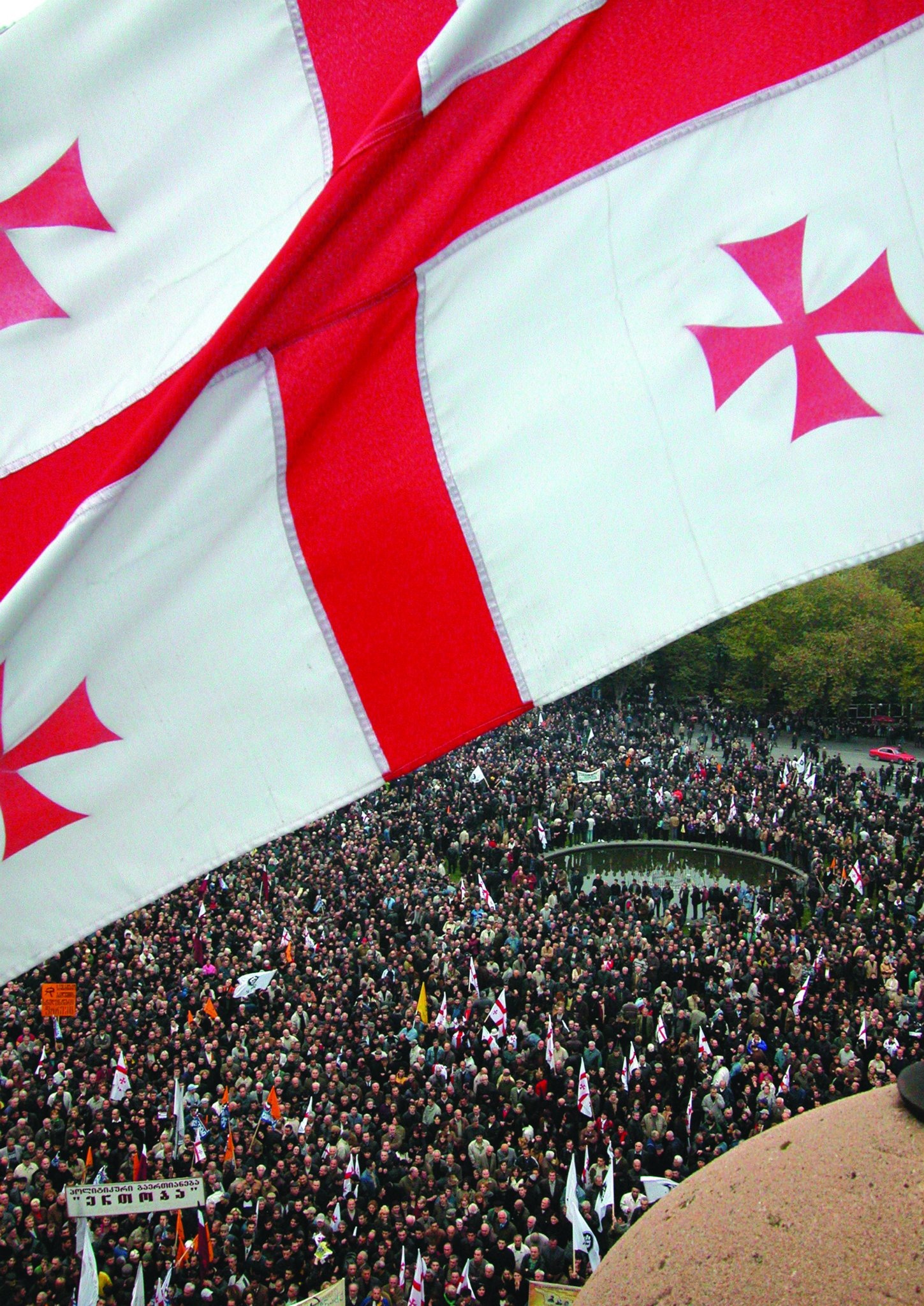
Protesters gathering at the Tbilisi Assembly Building during the Rose Revolution of 2003

In 2003, Shevardnadze (who won re-election in 2000) was deposed by the Rose Revolution, after Georgian opposition and international monitors asserted that the 2 November 2003 parliamentary elections were marred by fraud. The revolution was led by Mikheil Saakashvili, Zurab Zhvania and Nino Burjanadze, former members and leaders of Shevardnadze's ruling party. Mikheil Saakashvili was elected as President of Georgia in 2004.

Following the Rose Revolution, a series of reforms were launched to strengthen the country's military and economic capabilities, as well as to reorient its foreign policy westwards. According to the US Department of State, Georgia moved "from a near-failed state in 2003 to a relatively well-functioning market economy in 2014...[and] Through dramatic police and institutional reforms, the government has eradicated low-level corruption". The new government's efforts to reassert Georgian authority in the southwestern autonomous republic of Adjara led to a major crisis in 2004.

The country's newly pro-Western stance, along with accusations of Georgian involvement in the Second Chechen War, resulted in a severe deterioration of relations with Russia, fuelled also by Russia's open assistance and support to the two secessionist areas. Despite these increasingly difficult relations, in May 2005 Georgia and Russia reached a bilateral agreement by which Russian military bases (dating back to the Soviet era) in Batumi and Akhalkalaki were withdrawn. Russia withdrew all personnel and equipment from these sites by December 2007 while failing to withdraw from the Gudauta base in Abkhazia, which it was required to vacate after the adoption of the Adapted Conventional Armed Forces in Europe Treaty during the 1999 Istanbul summit.

=== Russo-Georgian War ===
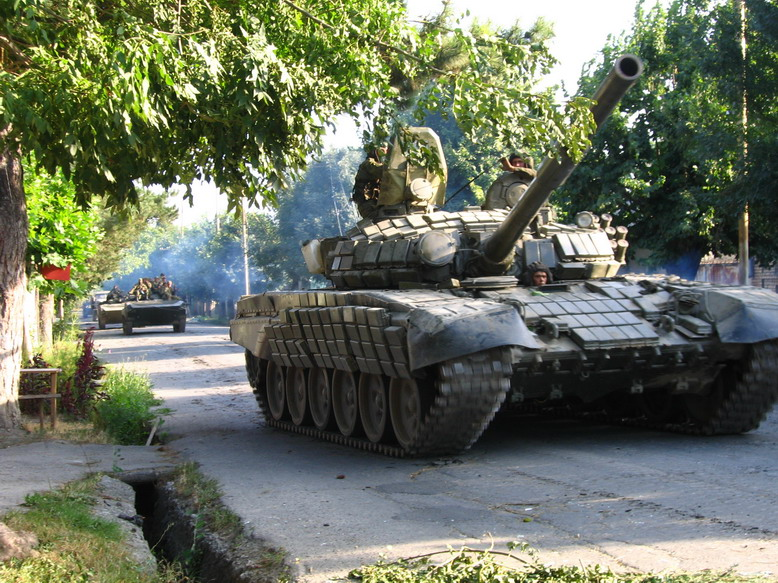
A Russian tank during its invasion of Georgia.

Relations between Georgia and separatists in Abkhazia and South Ossetia have been tense since the dissolution of the Soviet Union in 1991. Relations between Russia and Georgia severely deteriorated into the April 2008 Russo-Georgian diplomatic crisis. The Russo-Georgian War of 2008 resulted in parts of Abkhazia and South Ossetia falling under the control of Russian-backed separatists, with Russian military bases being established in those regions.

A bomb explosion on 1 August 2008 targeted a car transporting Georgian peacekeepers. South Ossetians were responsible for instigating this incident, which marked the opening of hostilities and injured five Georgian servicemen, then several South Ossetian militiamen were killed by snipers. South Ossetian separatists began shelling Georgian villages on 1 August. These artillery bombardments caused Georgian servicemen to return fire periodically.

On 7 August 2008, the Georgian president Mikheil Saakashvili announced a unilateral ceasefire and called for peace talks. More attacks on Georgian villages (located in the South Ossetian conflict zone) were soon matched with gunfire from Georgian troops, who then proceeded to move in the direction of the capital of the self-proclaimed Republic of South Ossetia (Tskhinvali) on the night of 8 August, reaching its centre in the morning of 8 August. According to Russian military expert Pavel Felgenhauer, the Ossetian provocation was aimed at triggering Georgian retaliation, which was needed as a pretext for a Russian military invasion. According to Georgian intelligence and several Russian media reports, parts of the regular (non-peacekeeping) Russian Army had already moved to South Ossetian territory through the Roki Tunnel before the Georgian military action.

Russia accused Georgia of "aggression against South Ossetia" and began a large land, air and sea invasion of Georgia under the pretext of a "peace enforcement" operation on 8 August 2008. Abkhaz forces opened a second front on 9 August with the Battle of the Kodori Valley, an attack on the Kodori Gorge, held by Georgia. Tskhinvali was seized by the Russian military by 10 August. Russian forces occupied Georgian cities beyond the disputed territories.

During the conflict, there was a campaign of ethnic cleansing against Georgians in South Ossetia, including destruction of Georgian settlements after the war had ended. The war displaced 192,000 people, though many were able to return to their homes after the war. One year later, around 30,000 ethnic Georgians remained displaced. In an interview published in Kommersant, South Ossetian leader Eduard Kokoity said he would not allow Georgians to return.

The President of France, Nicolas Sarkozy, negotiated a ceasefire agreement on 12 August 2008. Russia recognized Abkhazia and South Ossetia as separate republics on 26 August. The Georgian government severed diplomatic relations with Russia. Russian forces left the buffer areas bordering Abkhazia and South Ossetia on 8 October and the European Union Monitoring Mission in Georgia was dispatched to the buffer areas. Since the war, Georgia has maintained that Abkhazia and South Ossetia are occupied Georgian territories.

=== Georgian Dream government (2012–present) ===
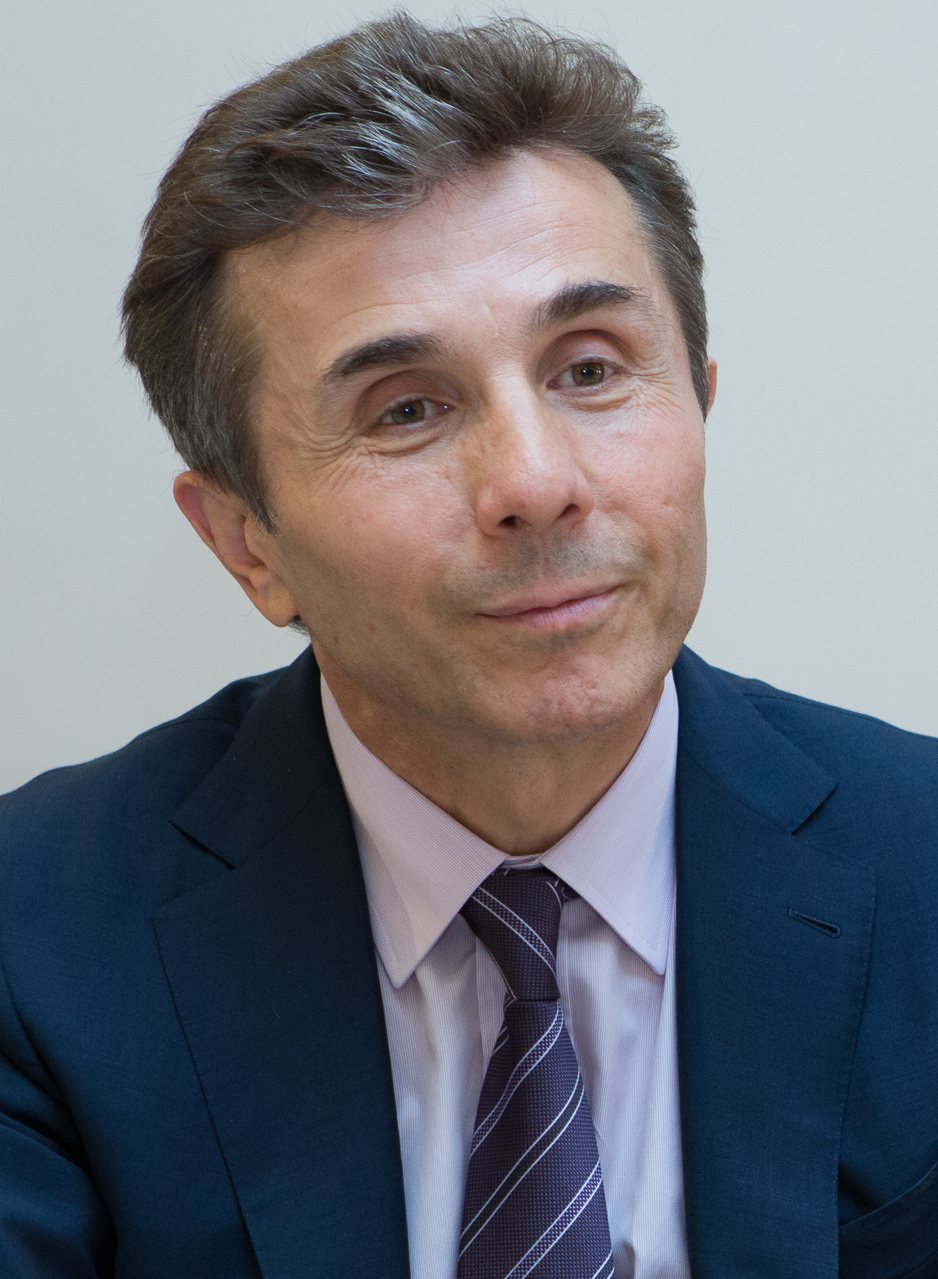
Bidzina Ivanishvili, founder and honorary chairman of Georgian Dream.

In preparation for the 2012 parliamentary elections, Georgia implemented constitutional reforms to switch to a parliamentary democracy, moving executive powers from the President to the Prime Minister. The transition was set to start with the 2012 parliamentary elections and to be completed with the 2013 presidential elections.

The 2012 Georgian parliamentary election marked the defeat of the United National Movement and the victory of the Georgian Dream party—the first peaceful electoral transfer of power in Georgia. The first year marked the contentious "cohabitation" period between the new Georgian Dream government and President Saakashvili, who retained his post until the presidential election in October 2013. Giorgi Margvelashvili, nominated by Georgian Dream, won the election and succeeded Saakashvili, further solidifying the power of Georgian Dream. Bidzina Ivanishvili, a businessman who founded the Georgian Dream, served as its first Prime Minister before resigning in 2013. However, he continued to be the most influential person within the party, despite not holding any position until 2018. As for Saakashvili, he left Georgia shortly after the 2013 election and was convicted in 2018 in absentia on corruption charges and abuse of power, which he denied. Saakashvili continued to be the chairman of the United National Movement party from abroad, which now became the main opposition party

Georgian Dream won the 2016 parliamentary elections, achieving a constitutional supermajority of 115 out of 150 seats. In the 2018 presidential election, the Georgian Dream party backed independent Salome Zurabishvili, who won in the second round, becoming the first woman in Georgia to hold the office in full capacity. This was the last direct election of a Georgian president, as additional constitutional reforms removed the popular vote.

In 2019, protests erupted over the visit of Russian MP Sergei Gavrilov and his participation in the Interparliamentary Assembly on Orthodoxy. The protesters demanded electoral reform to change the mixed proportional-majoritarian voting system which they alleged greatly benefited the ruling party in the 2016 election. The ruling party conceded on some demands and condemned Gavrilov's visit. After international mediation to overcome the deep political crisis in the run-up to the 2020 parliamentary elections, an amended electoral system was adopted, specifically for those elections. As result of the lowered threshold, nine parties were elected to parliament. Georgian Dream secured 48 percent of the votes, nearly the same as four years earlier, which translated into 90 out of 150 seats due to the more proportional electoral system with a highly reduced number of majoritarian districts. However, the opposition made accusations of fraud, triggering another round of political crisis, lasting months. The opposition and protesting citizens demanded a new vote. The political crisis was temporarily resolved by an EU brokered agreement in April 2021, from which both the ruling Georgian Dream and the opposition United National Movement withdrew a few months later.

During the Russian invasion of Ukraine in 2022, Georgia provided diplomatic and humanitarian support for Ukraine but did not join other countries in imposing sanctions on Russia. Since the beginning of the war, Georgia has topped the list of countries to which Russian exiles moved. Russians, just like many foreigners, were allowed to stay in Georgia for one year without a visa, though many Georgians began to view the presence of more Russian citizens in Georgia as a security risk. Shortly after the outbreak of the war, Georgia applied for membership of the EU at the same time as Ukraine and Moldova. While the latter two received the candidate status a few months later, Georgia was given conditions to receive the candidate status, which predominantly focused on judicial reforms, rule of law, de-oligarchization and addressing the highly polarized political and media climate.

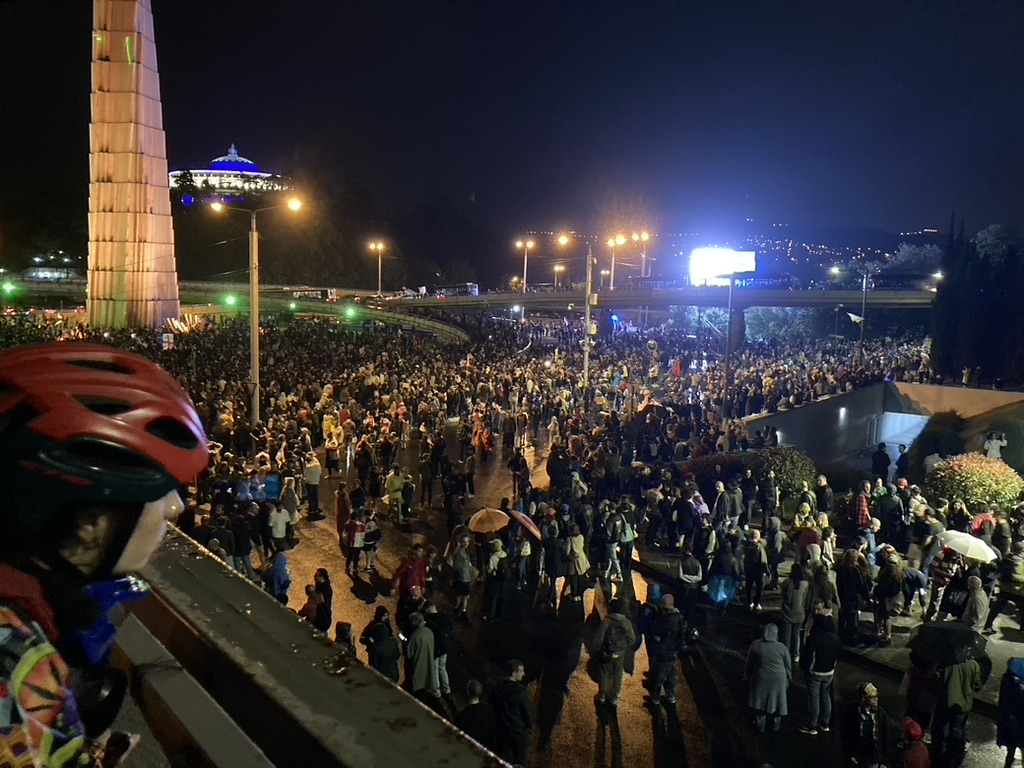
Thousands of protesters obstructing traffic at a busy intersection on Heroes Square

In the following months, the relations with the European Union worsened, and the Georgian Dream party turned from the pro-European social democratic one into the Eurosceptic and socially conservative party. In March 2023 Georgian Dream attempted to adopt the Law on Transparency of Foreign Influence, which requires Non-Governmental Organizations (NGOs) to register as "agents of foreign influence" if they receive more than 20 per cent of their funding from abroad. The discussions of the bill were determined amidst the protests and pressure from the US State Department, United Nations and European Union. A similar bill was introduced in April 2024 and adopted the next month.

In December 2023, despite not having fulfilled most conditions, Georgia was granted EU-candidate status. Instead, these criteria and additional ones, such as free and fair 2024 parliamentary elections, were made conditional for Georgia to move ahead to the actual accession talks.

The alleged irregularities and fraud in the 26 October 2024 Georgian parliamentary elections led to a political crisis and protests. The crisis was exacerbated after Prime Minister Irakli Kobakhidze announced the temporary suspension of the accession process of Georgia's EU membership until 2028, citing blackmail. Another round of political crisis developed amidst the inauguration of the ruling party candidate Mikheil Kavelashvili as the new president by the parliamentary electoral college, which the previous president Salome Zourabichvili, who went into opposition to the ruling party during the 2020–2021 Georgian political crisis, described as illegitimate and refused to recognize the transfer of power.

== Geography ==
Köppen climate classification map of Georgia

Georgia is a mountainous country situated almost entirely in the South Caucasus, while some slivers of the country are situated north of the Caucasus Watershed in the North Caucasus. The country lies between latitudes 41° and 44° N, and longitudes 40° and 47° E, with an area of 67,900 km^{2} (26,216 sq mi). The Likhi Range divides the country into eastern and western halves. Historically, the western portion of Georgia was known as Colchis while the eastern plateau was called Iberia.

The Greater Caucasus Mountain Range forms the northern border of Georgia. The main roads through the mountain range into Russian territory lead through the Roki Tunnel between Shida Kartli and North Ossetia and the Darial Gorge (in the Georgian region of Khevi). The southern portion of the country is bounded by the Lesser Caucasus Mountains. The Greater Caucasus Mountain Range is much higher in elevation than the Lesser Caucasus Mountains, with the highest peaks rising more than 5,000 metres (16,404 ft) above sea level.

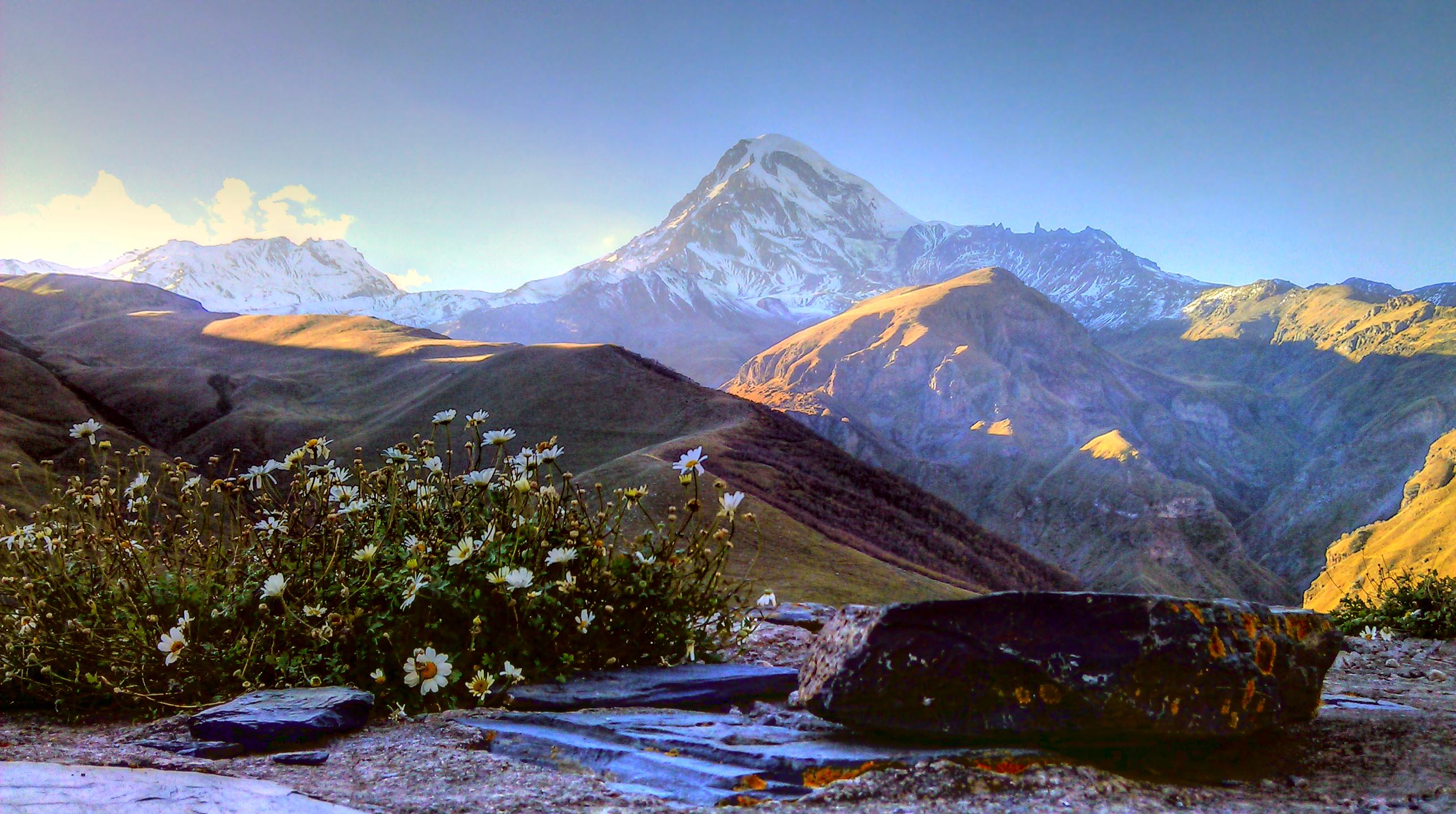
Mount Kazbek in northeastern Georgia

The highest mountain in Georgia is Mount Shkhara at 5,203 metres (17,070 ft), and the second highest is Mount Janga at 5,059 m (16,598 ft) above sea level. Other prominent peaks include Mount Kazbek at 5,047 m (16,558 ft), Shota Rustaveli Peak 4,960 m (16,273 ft), Tetnuldi 4,858 m (15,938 ft), Ushba 4,700 m (15,420 ft), and Ailama 4,547 m (14,918 ft). Out of the abovementioned peaks, only Kazbek is of volcanic origin. The region between Kazbek and Shkhara (a distance of about 200 km (124 mi) along the Main Caucasus Range) is dominated by numerous glaciers.

The term Lesser Caucasus Mountains is often used to describe the mountainous (highland) areas of southern Georgia that are connected to the Greater Caucasus Mountain Range by the Likhi Range. The overall region can be characterized as being made up of various, interconnected mountain ranges (largely of volcanic origin) and plateaus that do not exceed 3,400 metres (11,155 ft) in elevation. Prominent features of the area include the Javakheti Plateau, lakes, including Tabatskuri and Paravani, as well as mineral water and hot springs. Two major rivers in Georgia are the Rioni and the Mtkvari.

=== Topography ===
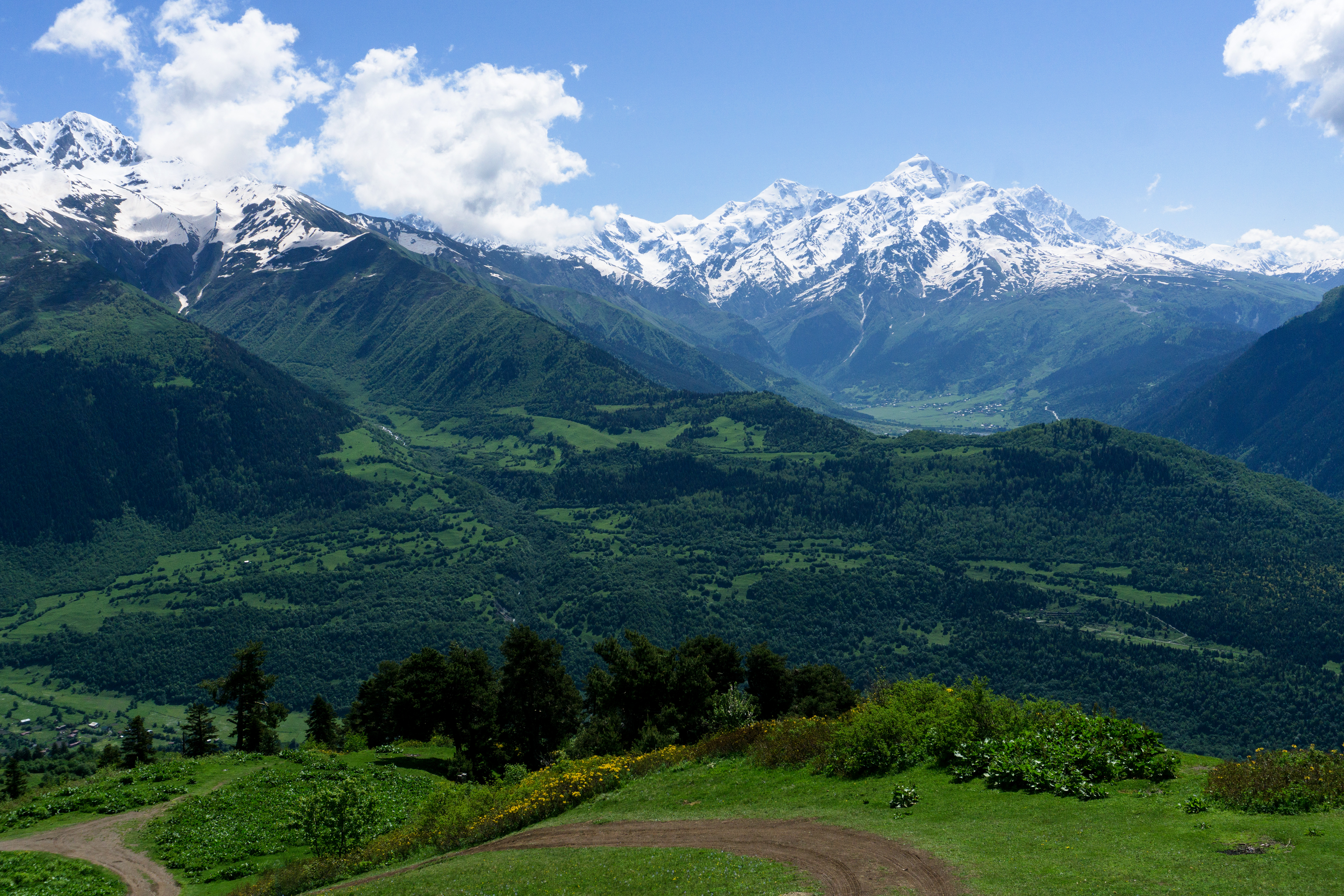
Svaneti region of Georgia

Mountain lakes in the country's northwest

The landscape within the nation's boundaries is quite varied. Western Georgia's landscape ranges from low-land marsh-forests, swamps, and temperate rainforests to eternal snows and glaciers, while the eastern part of the country even contains a small segment of semi-arid plains.

Much of the natural habitat in the low-lying areas of western Georgia has disappeared during the past 100 years because of agricultural development and urbanization. A large majority of the forests that covered the Colchis plain are now virtually non-existent with the exception of the regions that are included in the national parks and reserves (e.g. Lake Paliastomi area). At present, the forest cover generally remains outside of the low-lying areas and is mainly located along the foothills and the mountains. Western Georgia's forests consist mainly of deciduous trees below 600 metres (1,969 ft) above sea level and contain species such as oak, hornbeam, beech, elm, ash, and chestnut. Evergreen species such as box may also be found in many areas. About 1,000 of the 4,000 higher plants of Georgia are endemic.

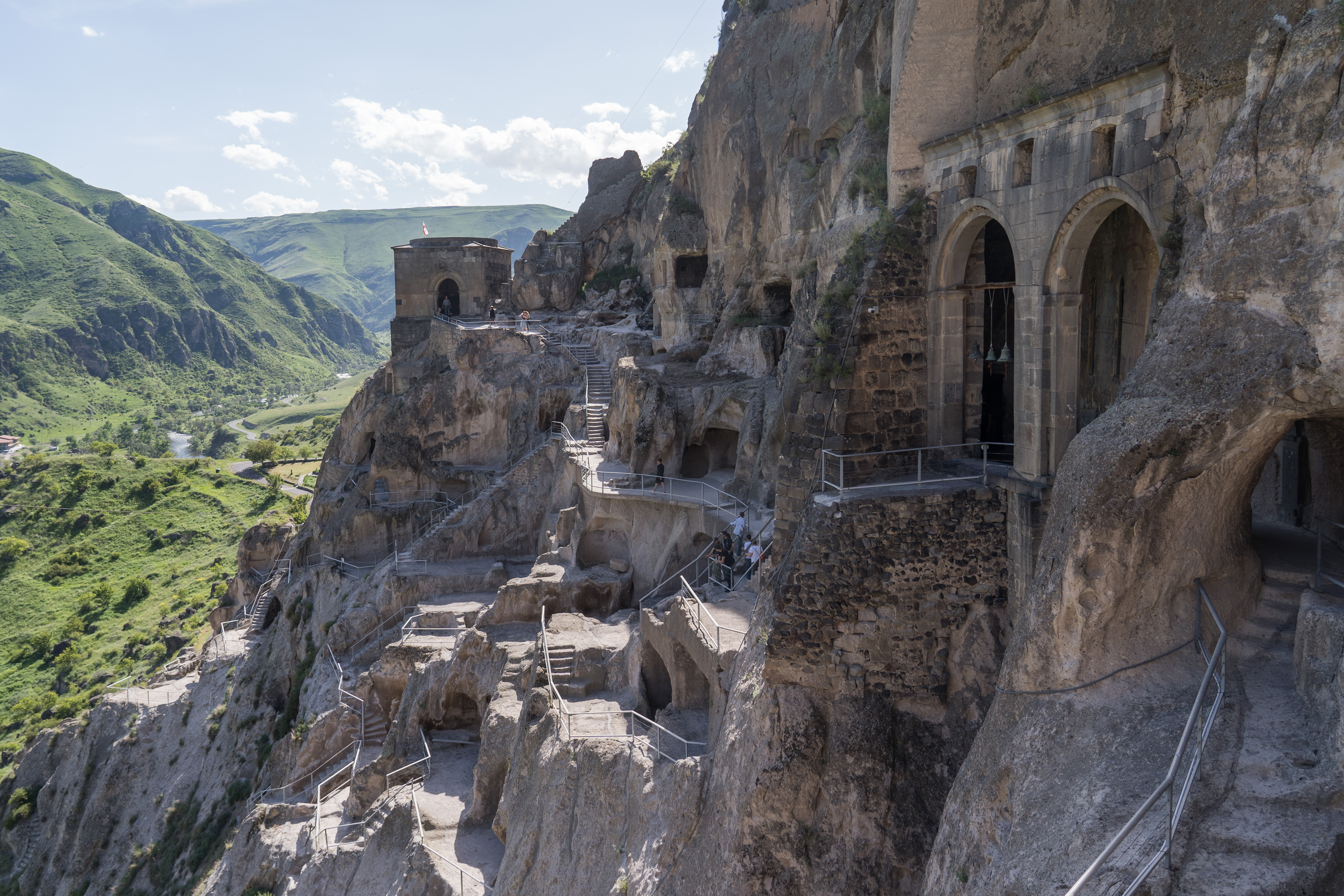
The cave city of Vardzia, with the valley of the Kura River below

The west-central slopes of the Meskheti Range in Ajaria as well as several locations in Samegrelo and Abkhazia are covered by temperate rain forests. Between 600–1,000 metres (1,969–3,281 ft) above sea level, the deciduous forest becomes mixed with both broad-leaf and coniferous species making up the plant life. The zone is made up mainly of beech, spruce, and fir forests. From 1,500–1,800 metres (4,921–5,906 ft), the forest becomes largely coniferous. The tree line generally ends at around 1,800 metres (5,906 ft) and the alpine zone takes over, which in most areas, extends up to an elevation of 3,000 metres (9,843 ft) above sea level.

The general landscape of eastern Georgia comprises numerous valleys and gorges that are separated by mountains. In contrast with western Georgia, nearly 85 per cent of the forests of the region are deciduous. Coniferous forests only dominate in the Borjomi Gorge and in the extreme western areas. Out of the deciduous species of trees, beech, oak, and hornbeam dominate. Other deciduous species include several varieties of maple, aspen, ash, and hazelnut.

At higher elevations above 1,000 metres (3,281 ft) above sea level (particularly in the Tusheti, Khevsureti, and Khevi regions), pine and birch forests dominate. In general, the forests in eastern Georgia occur between 500–2,000 metres (1,640–6,562 ft) above sea level, with the alpine zone extending from 2,000–2,300 to 3,000–3,500 meters (6,562–7,546 to 9,843–11,483 ft). The only remaining large, low-land forests remain in the Alazani Valley of Kakheti.

=== Climate ===
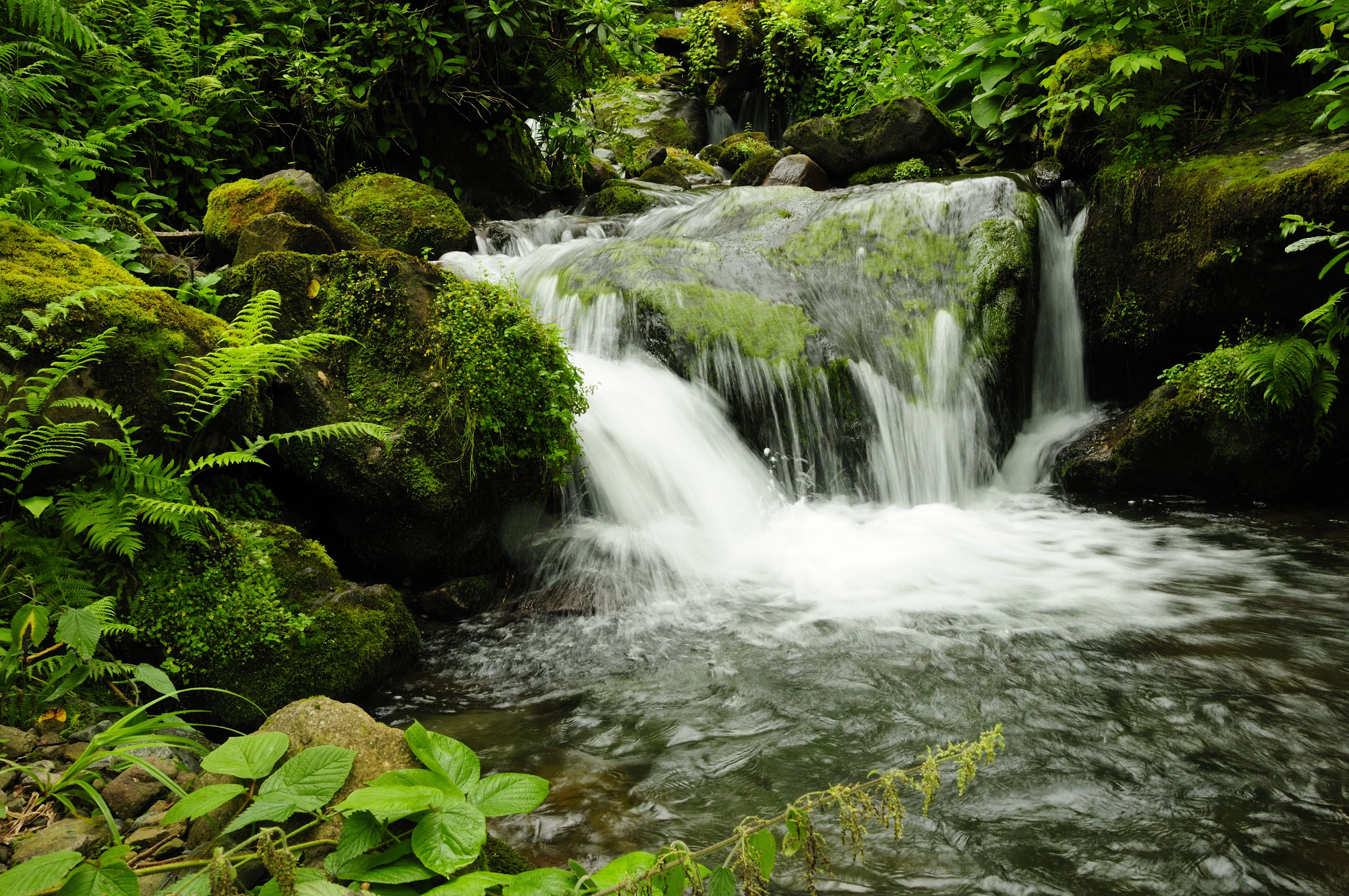
Parts of Western Georgia have a subtropical climate, with frequent rain and plenty of green vegetation.

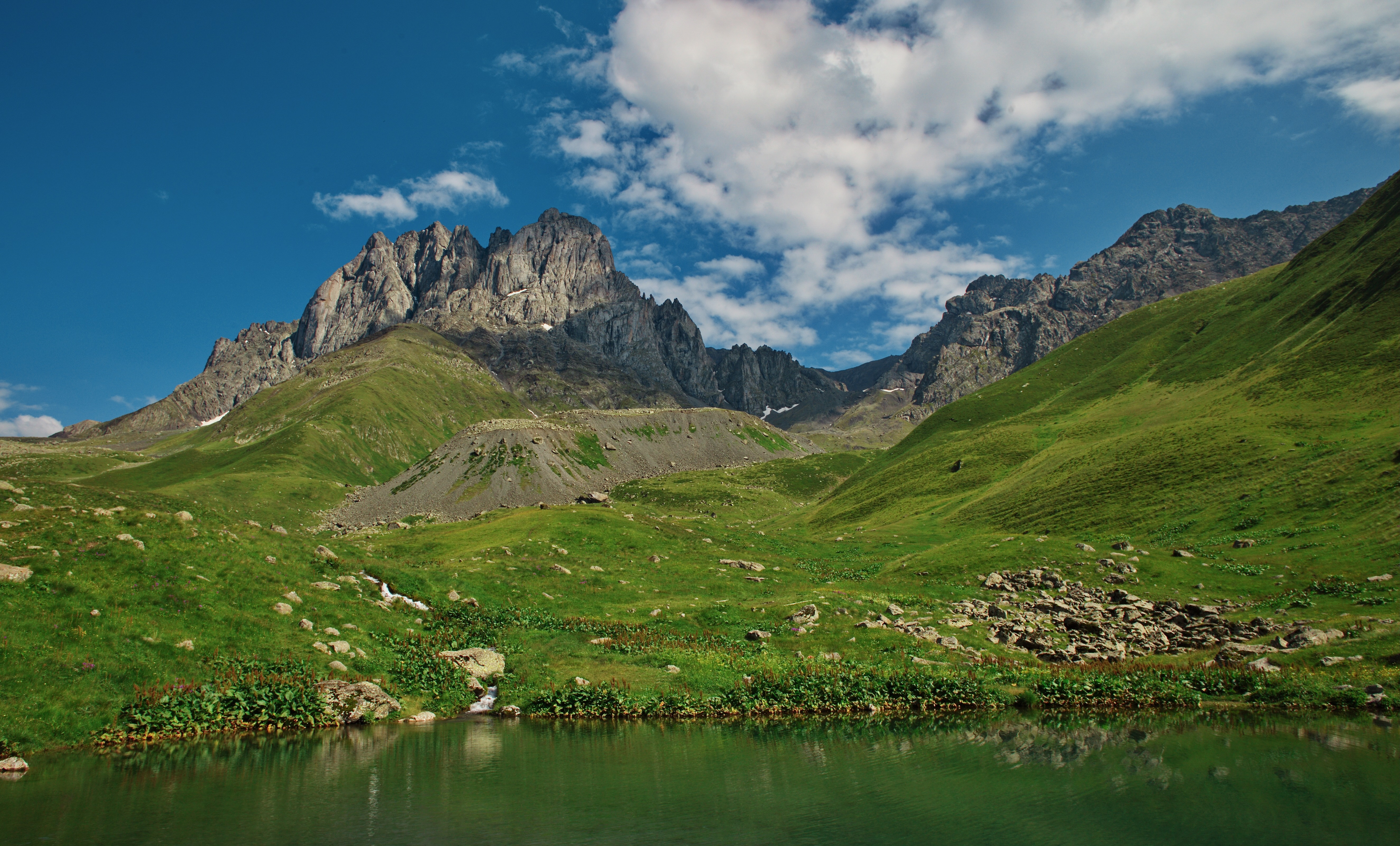
A small alpine lake in northeastern Georgia

The climate of Georgia is extremely diverse, considering the nation's small size. There are two main climatic zones, roughly corresponding to the eastern and western parts of the country. The Greater Caucasus Mountain Range plays an important role in moderating Georgia's climate and protects the nation from the penetration of colder air masses from the north. The Lesser Caucasus Mountains partially protect the region from the influence of dry and hot air masses from the south.

Much of western Georgia lies within the northern periphery of the humid subtropical zone with annual precipitation ranging from 1,000–2,500 mm (39–98 in), reaching a maximum during the Autumn months. The climate of the region varies significantly with elevation and while much of the lowland areas of western Georgia are relatively warm throughout the year, the foothills and mountainous areas (including both the Greater and Lesser Caucasus Mountains) experience cool, wet summers and snowy winters (snow cover often exceeds 2 metres or 6 feet 7 inches in many regions).

Eastern Georgia has a transitional climate from humid subtropical to continental. The region's weather patterns are influenced both by dry Caspian air masses from the east and humid Black Sea air masses from the west. The penetration of humid air masses from the Black Sea is often blocked by mountain ranges (Likhi and Meskheti) that separate the eastern and western parts of the nation. The wettest periods generally occur during spring and autumn, while winter and summer months tend to be the driest. Much of eastern Georgia experiences hot summers (especially in the low-lying areas) and relatively cold winters. As in the western parts of the nation, elevation plays an important role in eastern Georgia where climatic conditions above 1,500 metres (4,921 ft) are considerably colder than in the low-lying areas.

=== Biodiversity ===
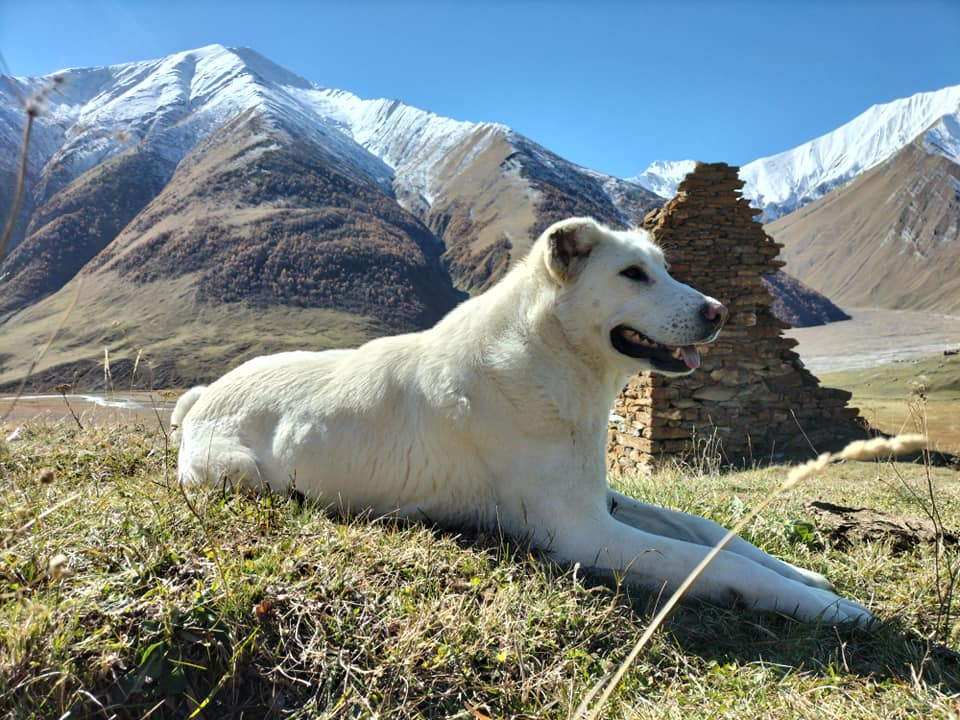
Georgian Shepherd Dog

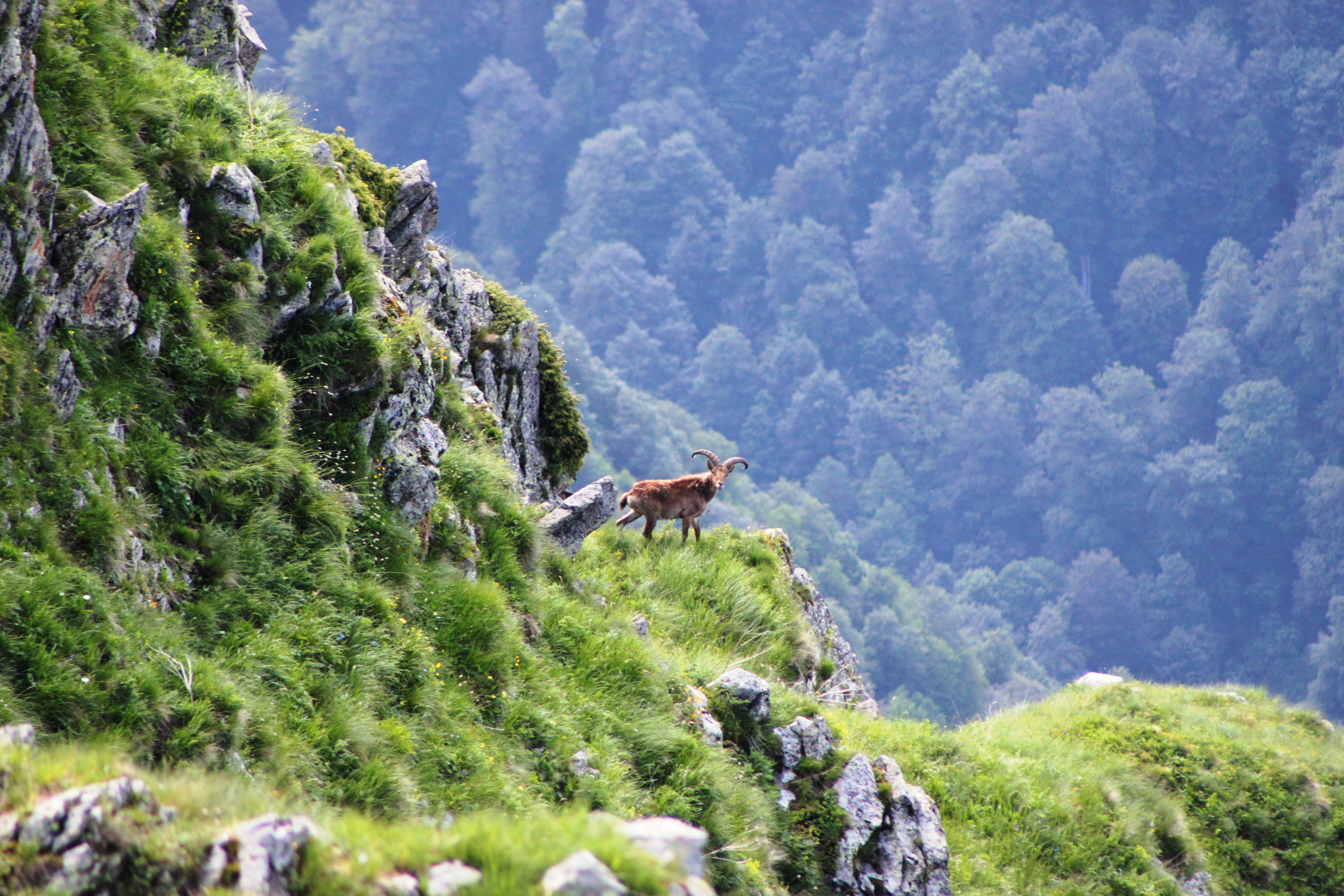
East Caucasian tur on the cliffs of Lagodekhi Protected Areas

Because of its high landscape diversity and low latitude, Georgia is home to about 5,601 species of animals, including 648 species of vertebrates (more than 1% of the species found worldwide) and many of these species are endemics. A number of large carnivores live in the forests, namely brown bears, wolves, lynxes and Caucasian leopards. The common pheasant (also known as the Colchian pheasant) is an endemic bird of Georgia which has been widely introduced throughout the rest of the world as a game bird. The number of invertebrate species is considered to be very high but data is distributed across a high number of publications. The spider checklist of Georgia, for example, includes 501 species. The Rioni River may contain a breeding population of the critically endangered bastard sturgeon.

Slightly more than 6,500 species of fungi, including lichen-forming species, have been recorded from Georgia, but this number is far from complete. The true total number of fungal species occurring in Georgia, including species not yet recorded, is likely to be far higher, given the generally accepted estimate that only about seven per cent of all fungi worldwide have so far been discovered. Although the amount of available information is still very small, a first effort has been made to estimate the number of fungal species endemic to Georgia, and 2,595 species have been tentatively identified as possible endemics of the country. 1,729 species of plants have been recorded from Georgia in association with fungi. According to the International Union for Conservation of Nature, there are 4,300 species of vascular plants in Georgia.

Georgia is home to four ecoregions: Caucasus mixed forests, Euxine-Colchic deciduous forests, Eastern Anatolian montane steppe, and Azerbaijan shrub desert and steppe. It had a 2018 Forest Landscape Integrity Index mean score of 7.79/10, ranking it 31st globally out of 172 countries.

== Government and politics ==
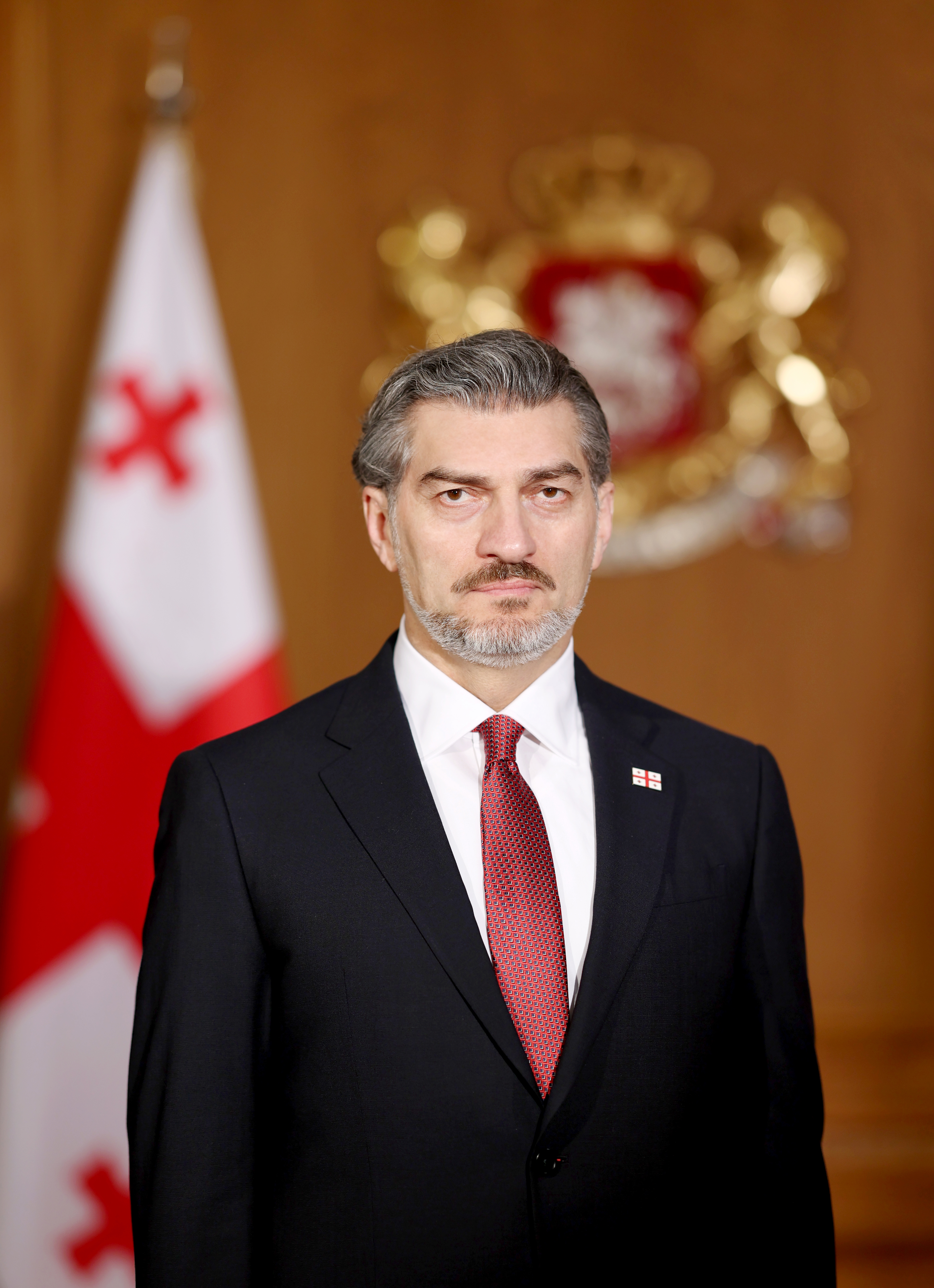
Mikheil Kavelashvili
President

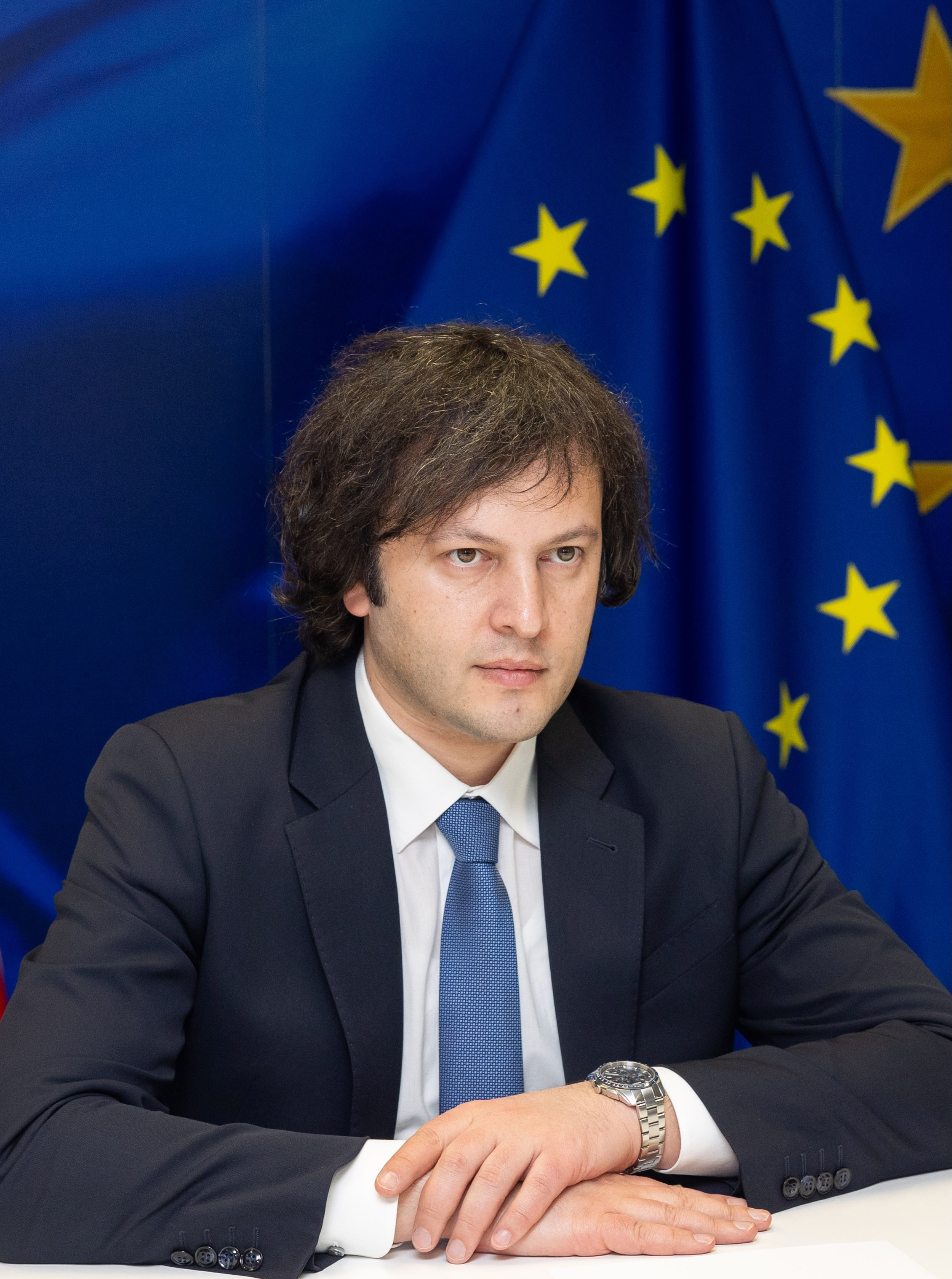
Irakli Kobakhidze
Prime Minister

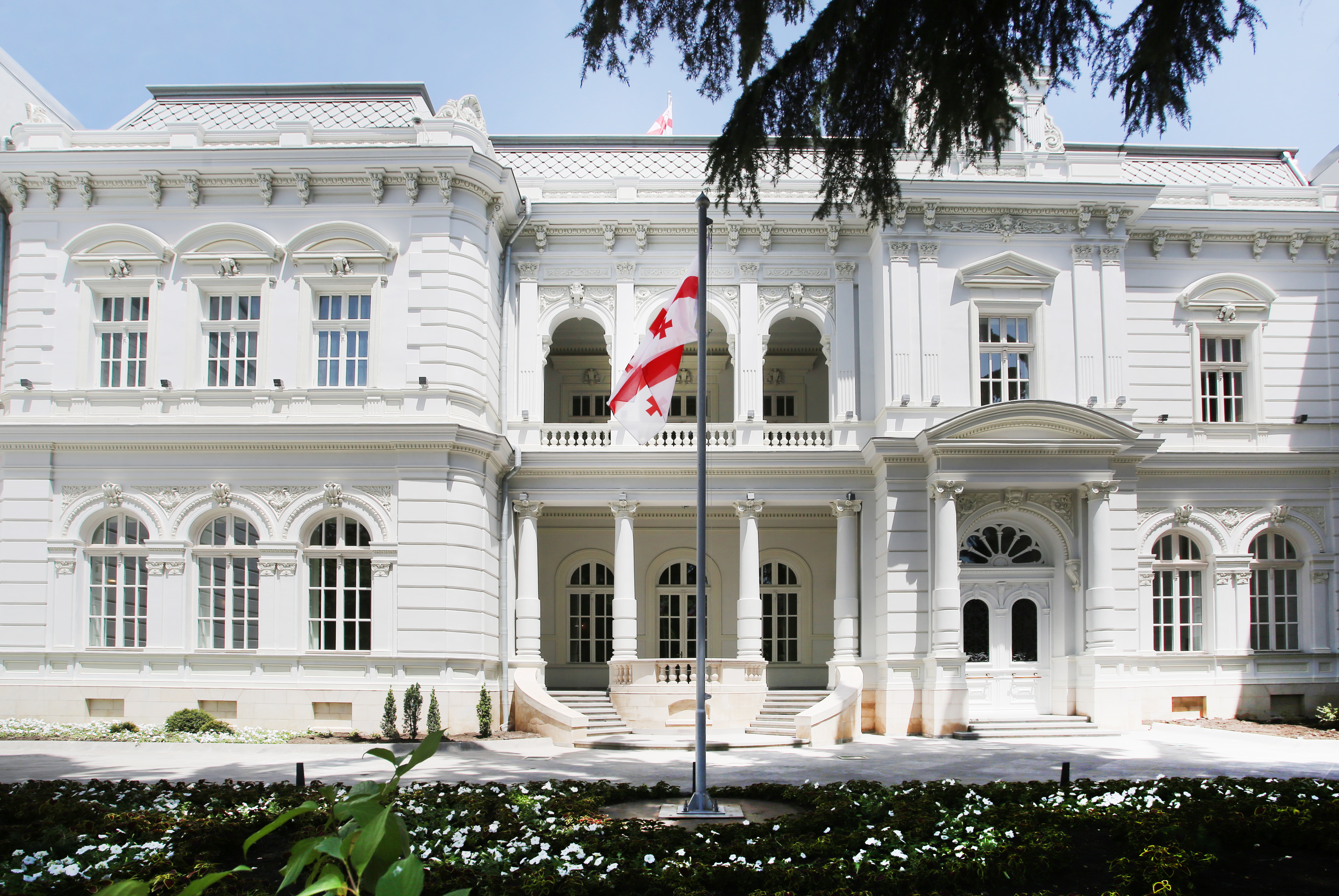
Orbeliani Palace is the official seat of the Georgian President, an institution that has seen diminished power since 2018.

Georgia is a representative democratic parliamentary republic; the President serves as the largely ceremonial head of state, whereas the Prime Minister is head of government. Executive power is vested in the Cabinet of Georgia, composed of ministers headed by the Prime Minister and appointed by the Parliament. As of 2025, the presidency is disputed between Salome Zourabichvili, who claims to be the de jure head of state, and Mikheil Kavelashvili, who was inaugurated by the ruling party following the widely disputed 2024 Georgian presidential election. Since February 2024, the post of the Prime Minister has been occupied by Irakli Kobakhidze, whose legitimacy is also disputed.

Legislative authority is vested in the Parliament of Georgia. It is unicameral and has 150 members, known as deputies, of whom 30 are elected by plurality to represent single-member districts, and 120 are chosen to represent parties by proportional representation. Members of parliament are elected for four-year terms.

According to International IDEA's Global State of Democracy (GSoD) Indices and Democracy Tracker, Georgia performs in the mid-range on overall democratic measures, with particular strength in absence of corruption.

Different opinions exist regarding the degree of political freedom in Georgia. Saakashvili believed in 2008 that the country is "on the road to becoming a European democracy." In their 2022 report Freedom House lists Georgia as "partly free", recognizing a trajectory of democratic improvement surrounding the 2012–13 transfer of power but observed a process of democratic backslide in later years of the Georgian Dream rule. In the 2023 Democracy Index, the Economist Intelligence Unit classifies Georgia as a "hybrid regime", which denotes an incomplete democratic transition from authoritarianism to democracy characterized by elements of both systems.

In 2025, the annual Democracy Index of the V-Dem Institute classified Georgia for the first time as an electoral autocracy, noting the country showed one of the biggest drops on the list and its largest one-year decline. V-Dem notes Georgia is considered to be in a so-called "bell-turn" episode or "failed democratization", meaning its autocratization took place less than five years after a period of democratization. The report describes that post-Saakashvili Georgia went through a period of democratization with improvements in judicial independence, freedom of speech, and civil liberties. The reversal of this trend started in 2018, with gradual deteriorations till 2023 when rapid democratic erosion set in, resulting in a plummeting of the score in 2024.

=== Administrative divisions ===
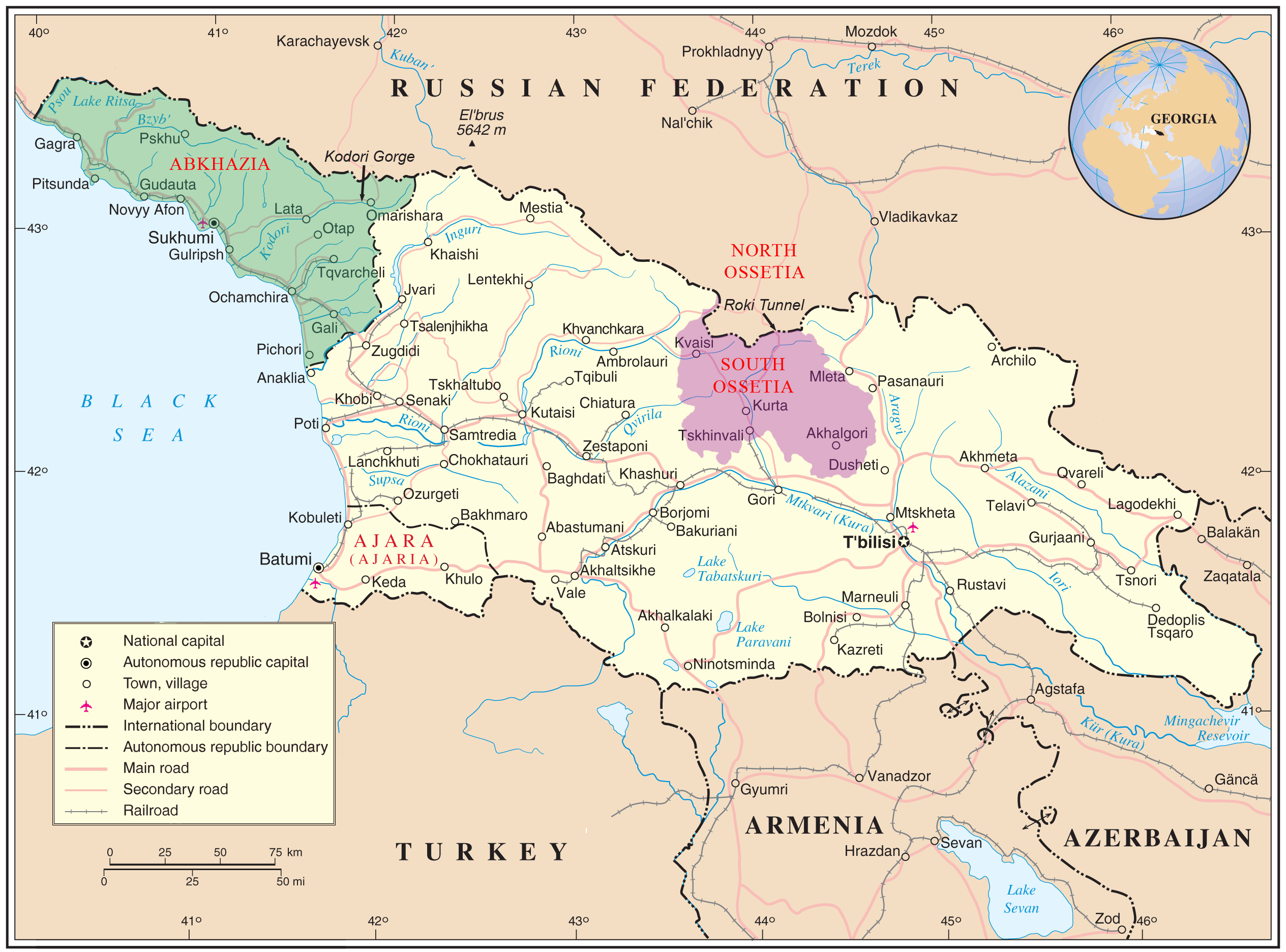
Map of Georgia highlighting the disputed territories of Abkhazia and Tskhinvali Region (South Ossetia), both of which are outside the control of the central government of Georgia

Georgia is administratively divided into 9 regions, 1 capital region, and 2 autonomous republics. These in turn are subdivided into 67 districts and 5 self-governing cities.

Georgia contains two official autonomous regions, of which one has declared independence. Officially autonomous within Georgia, the de facto independent region of Abkhazia declared independence in 1999. In addition, another territory not officially autonomous has also declared independence. South Ossetia is officially known by Georgia as the Tskhinvali region, as it views "South Ossetia" as implying political bonds with Russian North Ossetia. It was called South Ossetian Autonomous Oblast when Georgia was part of Soviet Union. Its autonomous status was revoked in 1990. De facto separate since Georgian independence, offers were made to give South Ossetia autonomy again, but in 2006 an unrecognized referendum in the area resulted in a vote for independence.

In both Abkhazia and South Ossetia large numbers of people had been given Russian passports, some through a process of forced passportization by Russian authorities. This was used as a justification for Russian invasion of Georgia during the 2008 South Ossetia war after which Russia recognized the region's independence. Georgia considers the regions as occupied by Russia. The two self-declared republics gained limited international recognition after the 2008 Russo-Georgian War. Most countries consider the regions to be Georgian territory under Russian occupation.

Region	Centre	Area (km^{2})	Population	Density
Abkhazia	Sukhumi	8,660	242,862^{est}	28.04
Adjara	Batumi	2,880	333,953	115.95
Guria	Ozurgeti	2,033	113,350	55.75
Imereti	Kutaisi	6,475	533,906	82.45
Kakheti	Telavi	11,311	318,583	28.16
Kvemo Kartli	Rustavi	6,072	423,986	69.82
Mtskheta-Mtianeti	Mtskheta	6,786	94,573	13.93
Racha-Lechkhumi and Kvemo Svaneti	Ambrolauri	4,990	32,089	6.43
Samegrelo-Zemo Svaneti	Zugdidi	7,440	330,761	44.45
Samtskhe-Javakheti	Akhaltsikhe	6,413	160,504	25.02
Shida Kartli	Gori	5,729	300,382^{est}	52.43
Tbilisi	Tbilisi	720	1,108,717	1,539.88

=== Foreign relations ===
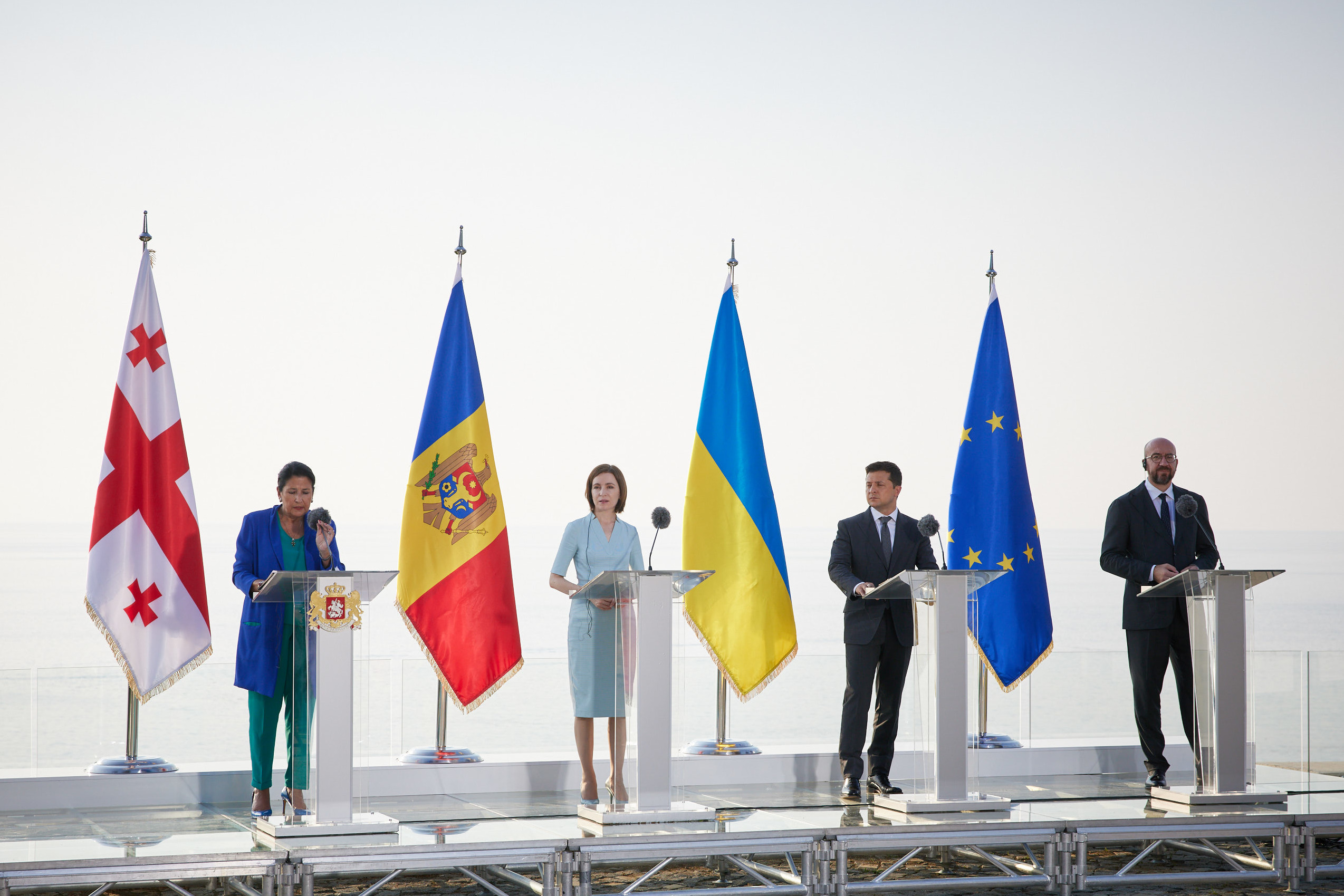
President of Georgia Salome Zourabichvili, President of Moldova Maia Sandu, President of Ukraine Volodymyr Zelenskyy and President of the European Council Charles Michel during the 2021 Batumi International Conference. In 2014, the EU signed Association Agreements with all three states.

The explicit western orientation of Georgia, deepening political ties with the US and European Union, notably through its EU and NATO membership aspirations, the US Train and Equip military assistance programme, and the construction of the Baku–Tbilisi–Ceyhan pipeline, increasingly strained Tbilisi's relations with Moscow in the early 2000s. Georgia's decision to boost its presence in the coalition forces in Iraq was an important initiative. The European Union has identified Georgia as a prospective member, and Georgia has sought membership.

Georgia is currently working to become a full member of NATO. In August 2004, the Individual Partnership Action Plan of Georgia was submitted officially to NATO. On 29 October 2004, the North Atlantic Council of NATO approved the Individual Partnership Action Plan (IPAP) of Georgia, and Georgia moved on to the second stage of Euro-Atlantic Integration. In 2005, the agreement on the appointment of Partnership for Peace (PfP) liaison officer between Georgia and NATO came into force, whereby a liaison officer for the South Caucasus was assigned to Georgia. On 2 March 2005, the agreement was signed on the provision of the host nation support to and transit of NATO forces and NATO personnel. On 6–9 March 2006, the IPAP implementation interim assessment team arrived in Tbilisi. On 13 April 2006, the discussion of the assessment report on implementation of the Individual Partnership Action Plan was held at NATO Headquarters, within 26+1 format. In 2009 the Georgia-NATO Interparliamentary Council was created within the NATO Parliamentary Assembly to hold twice yearly meetings to discuss all aspects of Georgia-NATO cooperation. In 2017, a poll by the National Democratic Institute, an American NGO, revealed that the majority of Georgians and politicians in Georgia support the push for NATO membership.

In 2011, the North Atlantic Council designated Georgia as an "aspirant country". Since 2014, Georgia–NATO relations are guided by the Substantial NATO–Georgia Package (SNGP), which includes the NATO–Georgia Joint Training and Evaluation Centre and facilitation of multi-national and regional military drills.

Georgians demonstrating in solidarity with Ukraine shortly after the 2022 Russian invasion.

In September 2019, Russian Foreign Minister Sergey Lavrov said that "NATO approaching our borders is a threat to Russia." He was quoted as saying that if NATO accepts Georgian membership with the article on collective defence covering only Tbilisi-administered territory—i.e., excluding the Georgian territories Abkhazia and South Ossetia, both of which are currently Russian-supported unrecognized breakaway republics—"we will not start a war, but such conduct will undermine our relations with NATO and with countries who are eager to enter the alliance."

George W. Bush became the first sitting U.S. president to visit the country. The street leading to Tbilisi International Airport has since been dubbed George W. Bush Avenue. On 2 October 2006, Georgia and the European Union signed a joint statement on the agreed text of the Georgia–European Union Action Plan within the European Neighbourhood Policy (ENP). The Action Plan was formally approved at the EU–Georgia Cooperation Council session on 14 November 2006, in Brussels. In June 2014, the EU and Georgia signed an Association Agreement, which entered into force on 1 July 2016. On 13 December 2016, EU and Georgia reached the agreement on visa liberalization for Georgian citizens. On 27 February 2017, the Council adopted a regulation on visa liberalization for Georgians travelling to the EU for a period of stay of 90 days in any 180-day period.

Georgia applied for EU membership on 3 March 2022, soon after the beginning of the Russian invasion of Ukraine. In December 2023, Georgia was granted EU Candidate status by the European Council. In November 2024, Prime Minister Irakli Kobakhidze declared the country's EU accession process would be paused until 2028, leading to protests.

=== Military ===
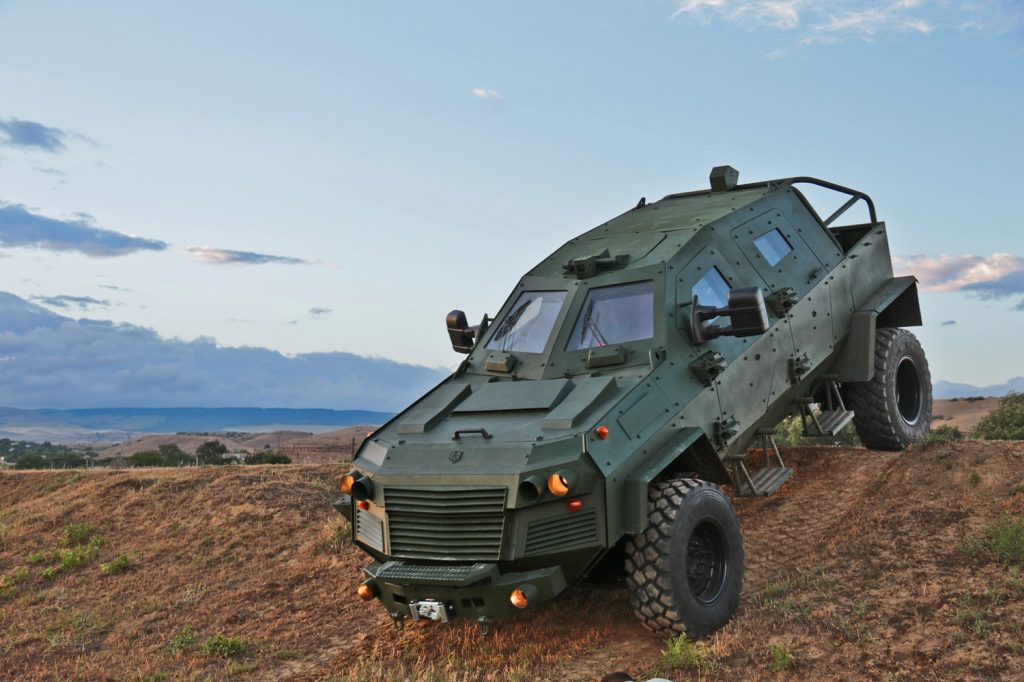
Georgian-built Didgori Warrior

Georgia's military is organized into land and air forces collectively known as the Georgian Defense Forces (GDF); naval forces were merged into the Coast Guard in 2009, which falls under the Internal Affairs Minister. More than 20% of the GDF consists of conscripts. The mission and functions of the GDF are based on the Constitution of Georgia, Georgia's Law on Defense and National Military Strategy, and international agreements to which Georgia is signatory. As of 2021, Georgia's military budget was 900₾ ($280) million, of which newly two-thirds is allocated for maintaining defence forces readiness and potency development. After its independence from the Soviet Union, Georgia began to develop its own military industry, namely through the state owned STC Delta. The country produces a range of indigenous military equipment, including armored vehicles, artillery systems, aviation systems, personal protection equipment, and small arms.

Georgian military personnel have served in several international operations. During later periods of the Iraq War, Georgia had up to 2,000 soldiers serving in the American-led Multi-National Force. Georgia also participated in the NATO-led International Security Assistance Force in Afghanistan; with 1,560 troops in 2013, it was at that time the largest contributor among non-NATO countries and in per capita terms. Over 11,000 Georgian soldiers rotated through Afghanistan during the course of the war; 32 were killed, mostly during the Helmand campaign, and 435 were wounded, including 35 amputees.

=== Law enforcement ===
In 2005, President Mikheil Saakashvili fired the entire traffic police force (numbering around 30,000 police officers) of the Georgian National Police due to corruption. A new force was then subsequently built around new recruits. The U.S. State Department's Bureau of International Narcotics and Law-Enforcement Affairs has provided assistance to the training efforts and continues to act in an advisory capacity.

The new Patruli force was first introduced in the summer of 2005 to replace the traffic police, a force which was accused of widespread corruption. The police introduced a 0–2–2 (currently, 1–1–2) emergency dispatch service in 2004.

=== Corruption ===
Prior to the Rose Revolution, Georgia was among the most corrupt countries in the world. However, following the reforms brought by the peaceful revolution, corruption in the country abated dramatically. In 2010, Transparency International (TI) named Georgia "the best corruption-buster in the world." In 2012, the World Bank called Georgia a "unique success" of the world in fighting corruption, noting "Georgia's experience shows that the vicious cycle of endemic corruption can be broken and, with appropriate and decisive reforms, can be turned into a virtuous cycle."

Although Georgia has been very successful in reducing blatant forms of corruption, other, more subtle corrupt practices have been noted. For example, in its 2017 report, Council of Europe observed that while most day-to-day corruption has been eliminated, there are some indications of a "clientelistic system" whereby the country's leadership may allocate resources in ways that generate the loyalty and support it needs to stay in power. Since 2012 stagnation in corruption fighting efforts can be observed, according to Transparency International. Since 2016 the Transparency International Corruption Perception Index hovers around 56 out of 100 points. In comparison, that places Georgia in the top 50 out of 180 countries, among Central European and Mediterranean EU member states.

=== Human rights and freedom ===
Human rights in Georgia are guaranteed by the country's constitution. There is an independent human rights public defender elected by the Parliament of Georgia to ensure such rights are enforced. Georgia has ratified the Framework Convention for the Protection of National Minorities in 2005. NGO "Tolerance", in its alternative report about its implementation, speaks of a rapid decrease in the number of Azerbaijani schools and cases of appointing headmasters to Azerbaijani schools who do not speak the Azerbaijani language.

The government came under criticism for its alleged use of excessive force on 26 May 2011 when it dispersed protesters led by Nino Burjanadze, among others, with tear gas and rubber bullets after they refused to clear Rustaveli Avenue for an independence day parade despite the expiration of their demonstration permit and despite being offered to choose an alternative venue. While human rights activists maintained that the protests were peaceful, the government pointed out that many protesters were masked and armed with heavy sticks and Molotov cocktails. Georgian opposition leader Nino Burjanadze said the accusations of planning a coup were baseless, and that the protesters' actions were legitimate.

Georgians protesting against homophobia in front of parliament following anti-LGBT unrest

Since independence, Georgia maintained harsh policies against drugs, handing out lengthy sentences even for marijuana use. This came under criticism from human rights activists and led to protests. In response to lawsuits from civil society organizations, in 2018 the Constitutional Court of Georgia ruled that "consumption of marijuana is an action protected by the right to free personality" and that "[Marijuana] can only harm the user's health, making that user him/herself responsible for the outcome. The responsibility for such actions does not cause dangerous consequences for the public." With this ruling, Georgia became one of the first countries in the world to legalize cannabis, although using the drug in the presence of children is still illegal and punishable by fines or imprisonment. Georgian prisons tend to be overcrowded with poor living conditions.

LGBT individuals in Georgia frequently face harassment and violence. Minor protections exist against discrimination on the basis of sexual orientation or gender identity. Since 2008 transgender people had been allowed to change their gender marker following sex reassignment surgery. However, a bill passed in 2024 seeks to remove many protections from LGBT people. The European Union, and various human rights organizations have condemned the legislation. In 2024, Georgian President Salome Zourabichvili condemned the high-profile murder of Kesaria Abramidze, a transgender woman, and subsequently attended her funeral to pay respects. The law prohibits both surgeries (or other manipulations) for changing a gender and indication of another gender in state-issued ID documents, among other things.

== Economy ==
Rank	Trading partner	Share of total trade turnover
1	European Union	22.1%
2	Turkey	12.2%
3	United States	10.9%
4	Russia	10.1%
5	China	8.9%

Georgia Countries with whom Georgia signed Free Trade Agreement (FTA) Countries with whom Georgia has General Schemes of Preference (GSP)

Archaeological research demonstrates that Georgia has been involved in commerce with many lands and empires since ancient times, largely due its location on the Black Sea and later on the historical Silk Road. Gold, silver, copper and iron have been mined in the Caucasus Mountains. Georgian wine making is a very old tradition and a key branch of the country's economy. The country has sizeable hydropower resources. Throughout Georgia's modern history, tourism has played a significant economic role because of the country's climate and topography.

For much of the 20th century, Georgia's economy was within the Soviet model of command economy. Since the fall of the USSR in 1991, Georgia embarked on a major structural reform designed to transition to a free market economy. As with all other post-Soviet states, Georgia faced a severe economic collapse. The civil war and military conflicts in South Ossetia and Abkhazia aggravated the crisis. The agriculture and industry output diminished. By 1994 the gross domestic product had shrunk to a quarter of that of 1989.

Since the early 21st century visible positive developments have been observed in the economy of Georgia. In 2007, Georgia's real GDP growth rate reached 12 per cent, making Georgia one of the fastest-growing economies in Eastern Europe. Georgia has become more integrated into the global trading network: its 2015 imports and exports account for 50% and 21% of GDP respectively. Georgia's main imports are vehicles, ores, fossil fuels and pharmaceuticals. Main exports are ores, ferro-alloys, vehicles, wines, mineral waters and fertilizers. The World Bank dubbed Georgia "the number one economic reformer in the world" because it has in one year improved from rank 112th to 18th in terms of ease of doing business, and by 2020 further improved its position to 6th in the world. As of 2021, it ranked 12th in the world for economic freedom. In 2019, Georgia ranked 61st on the Human Development Index (HDI). Between 2000 and 2019, Georgia's HDI score improved by 17.7%. Of factors contributing to HDI, education had the most positive influence as Georgia ranks in the top quintile in terms of education.

Georgia is developing into an international transport corridor through Batumi and Poti ports, Baku–Tbilisi–Kars Railway line, an oil pipeline from Baku through Tbilisi to Ceyhan, the Baku–Tbilisi–Ceyhan pipeline (BTC) and a parallel gas pipeline, the South Caucasus Pipeline.

Since coming to power the Saakashvili administration accomplished a series of reforms aimed at improving tax collection. Among other things a flat income tax was introduced in 2004. As a result, budget revenues have increased fourfold and a once large budget deficit has turned into a surplus.

As of 2001, 54 per cent of the population lived below the national poverty line but by 2006 poverty decreased to 34 per cent and by 2015 to 10.1 per cent. In 2015, the average monthly income of a household was 1,022.3₾ (about $426). 2015 calculations place Georgia's nominal GDP at US$13.98 billion. Georgia's economy is becoming more devoted to services (as of 2016, representing 59.4 per cent of GDP), moving away from the agricultural sector (6.1 per cent). Since 2014, unemployment has been gradually decreasing each year but remained in double digits and worsened during the COVID-19 pandemic. A perception of economic stagnation led to a 2019 survey of 1,500 residents finding unemployment was considered a significant problem by 73% of respondents, with 49% reporting their income had decreased over the prior year.

Georgia's telecommunications infrastructure is ranked the last among its bordering neighbours in the World Economic Forum's Network Readiness Index (NRI) – an indicator for determining the development level of a country's information and communication technologies. Georgia ranked number 58 overall in the 2016 NRI ranking, up from 60 in 2015. Georgia was ranked 56th in the Global Innovation Index in 2025.

=== Tourism ===
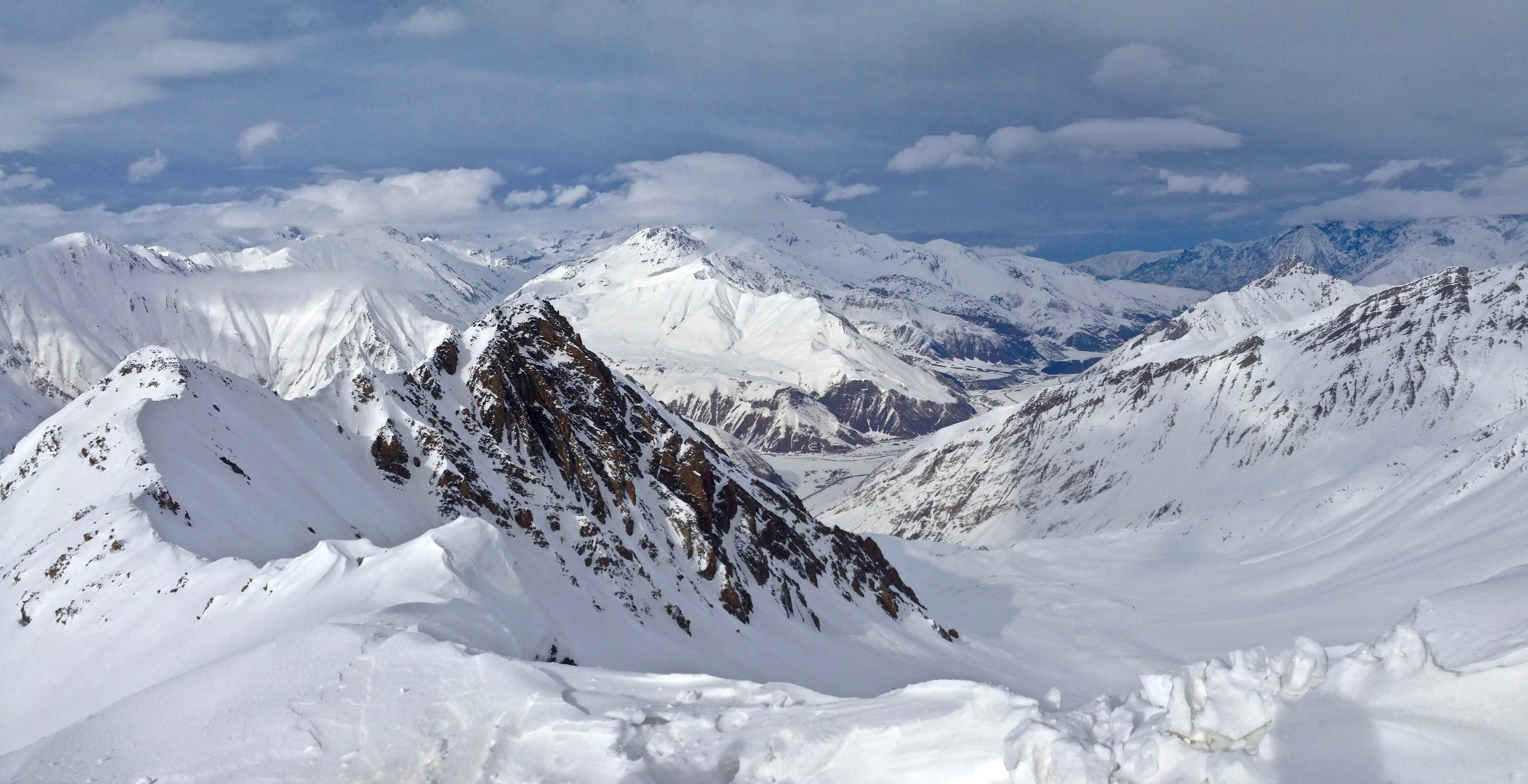
Gudauri is the most visited ski resort of Georgia.

Tourism is an increasingly significant part of the Georgian economy. In 2016, over 2.7 million tourists brought approximately US$2.16 billion to the country. In 2019, the number of international arrivals reached a record high of 9.3 million people. with foreign exchange income in the year's first three-quarters amounting to over US$3 billion. The country plans to host 11 million visitors by 2025 with annual revenues reaching US$6.6 billion. According to the government, there are 103 resorts in different climatic zones in Georgia. Tourist attractions include more than 2,000 mineral springs, over 12,000 historical and cultural monuments, four of which are recognized as UNESCO World Heritage Sites (Bagrati Cathedral in Kutaisi and Gelati Monastery, historical monuments of Mtskheta, and Upper Svaneti). Other tourist attractions are Cave City, Ananuri Castle/Church, Sighnaghi and Mount Kazbek. In 2018, more than 1.4 million tourists from Russia visited Georgia.

=== Transport ===
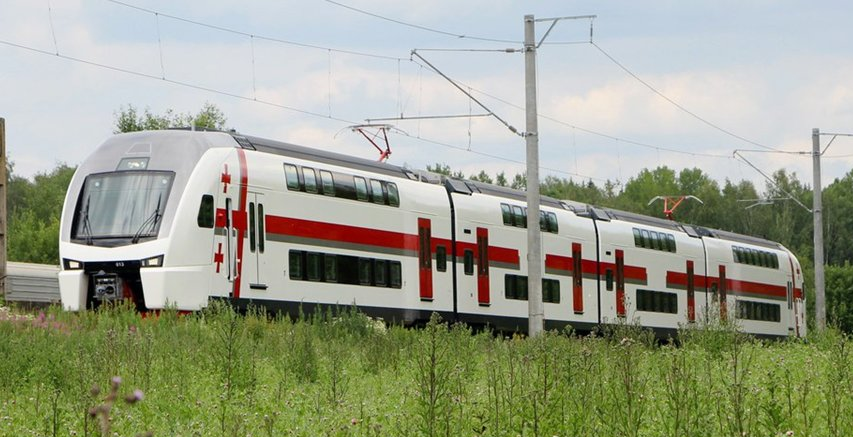
The Georgian Railways represent a vital artery linking the Black Sea and Caspian Sea – the shortest route between Europe and Central Asia.

Transport in Georgia is provided by rail, road, ferry, and air. The total length of roads in Georgia, excluding the occupied territories, is 21,110 kilometres (13,120 mi) and railways – 1,576 km (979 mi). Positioned in the Caucasus and on the coast of the Black Sea, Georgia is a key country for connecting the European Union with Asia while bypassing Russia, forming part of the Trans-Caspian International Transport Route.

The Georgian railways represent an important transport artery for the Caucasus, as they make up the largest proportion of a route linking the Black and Caspian Seas. In turn, this has allowed them to benefit in recent years from increased energy exports from neighbouring Azerbaijan to the European Union, Ukraine, and Turkey. Passenger services are operated by the state-owned Georgian Railway while freight operations are carried out by a number of licensed operators. Since 2004, the Georgian Railways have been undergoing a rolling programme of fleet-renewal and managerial restructuring which is aimed at making the service provided more efficient and comfortable for passengers. Infrastructural development has also been high on the agenda for the railways, with the key Tbilisi railway junction expected to undergo major reorganization in the near future. Additional projects also include the construction of the economically important Kars–Tbilisi–Baku railway, which was opened on 30 October 2017 and connects much of the Caucasus with Turkey by standard gauge railway.

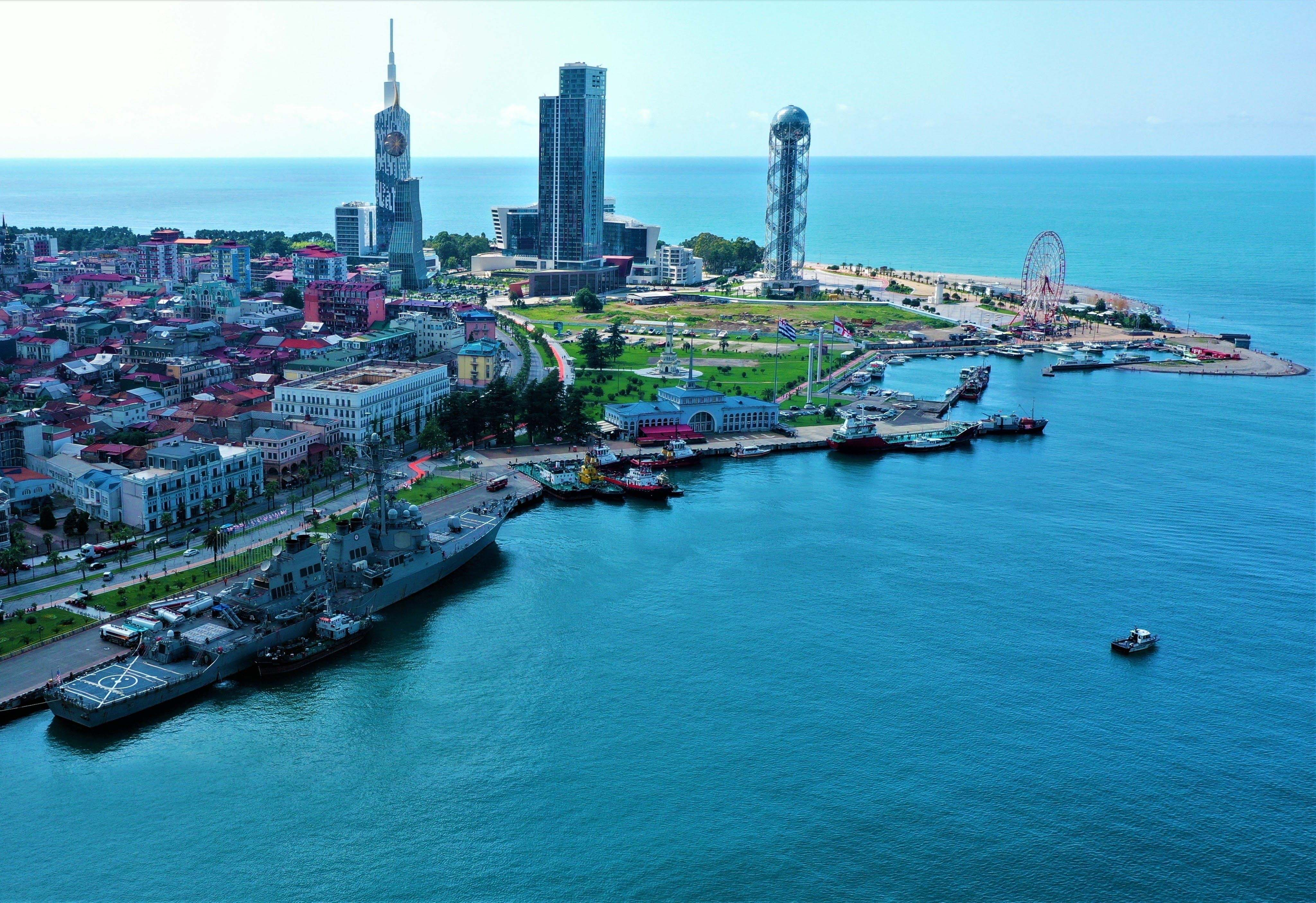
Batumi Seaport in June 2020

Air and maritime transport is developing in Georgia, with the former mainly used by passengers and the latter for transport of freight. Georgia currently has four international airports, the largest of which is by far Tbilisi International Airport, hub for Georgian Airways, which offers connections to many large European cities. Other airports in the country are largely underdeveloped or lack scheduled traffic, although, as of late, efforts have been made to solve both these problems. There are a number of seaports along Georgia's Black Sea coast, the largest and most busy of which is the Port of Batumi; while the town is itself a seaside resort, the port is a major cargo terminal in the Caucasus and is often used by neighbouring Azerbaijan as a transit point for making energy deliveries to Europe. Scheduled and chartered passenger ferry services link Georgia with Bulgaria, Romania, Turkey and Ukraine.

== Demographics ==
Ethno-linguistic groups in the Caucasus region as of 1995

Georgians do not fit into any of the main ethno-linguistic categories of Europe or Asia. The Georgian language, the most pervasive of the Kartvelian languages, is not Indo-European, Turkic, or Semitic. The present-day Georgian or Kartvelian nation is thought to have resulted from the fusion of indigenous inhabitants with various immigrants who moved into South Caucasus from Anatolia in remote antiquity.

Preliminary results of 2024 census indicates that the population is approximately 3,914,000 as of November 2024, (Note: Data not including Abkhazia and Tskhinvali Region/South Ossetia) an increase from 3,713,804 in the previous census in October 2014. The population declined by 40,000 in 2021, a reversal of the trend towards stabilization of the last decade and, for the first time since independence, the population was recorded to be below 3.7 million. According to the 2014 census, Ethnic Georgians form about 86.8 percent of the population, while the remainder includes ethnic groups such as Abkhazians, Armenians, Assyrians, Azerbaijanis, Greeks, Jews, Kists, Ossetians, Russians, Ukrainians, Yezidis and others. The Georgian Jews are one of the oldest Jewish communities in the world. According to the 1926 census there were 27,728 Jews in Georgia. (Note: Combined population of urban (23,433 in 1922) and rural (2,326 in 1917) communities.) Georgia was also once home to significant ethnic German communities, numbering 11,394 according to the 1926 census. (Note: Estimated 14,000 in 1922.) Most of them were deported during World War II.

The 2014 census, carried out in collaboration with the United Nations Population Fund (UNFPA), found a population gap of approximately 700,000 compared to the 2014 data from the National Statistical Office of Georgia, Geostat, which was cumulatively built on the 2002 census. Consecutive research estimated the 2002 census to be inflated by 8 to 9 percent, which affected the annually updated population estimates in subsequent years. One explanation put forward by UNFPA is that families of emigrants continued to list them in 2002 as residents for fear of losing certain rights or benefits. Also, the population registration system from birth to death was non-functional. It was not until around 2010 that parts of the system became reliable again. With the support of the UNFPA, the demographic data for the period 1994–2014 has been retro-projected. On the basis of that back-projection, Geostat has corrected its data for these years.

The 1989 census recorded 341,000 ethnic Russians, or 6.3 percent of the population, 52,000 Ukrainians and 100,000 Greeks in Georgia. The population of Georgia, including the breakaway regions, has declined by more than 1 million due to net emigration in the period 1990–2010. Other factors in the population decline include birth-death deficits for the period 1995–2010 and the exclusion of Abkhazia and South Ossetia from the statistics. Russia received by far the most migrants from Georgia. According to United Nations data, this totalled 625,000 by 2000, declining to 450,000 by 2019. Initially, the out-migration was driven by non-Georgian ethnicities, but increasing numbers of Georgians emigrated as well, due to the war, the crisis-ridden 1990s, and the subsequent bad economic outlook. The 2010 Russian census recorded about 158,000 ethnic Georgians living in Russia, with approximately 40,000 living in Moscow by 2014. There were 184 thousand immigrants in Georgia in 2014 with most of them hailing from Russia (51.6%), Greece (8.3%), Ukraine (8.11%), Germany (4.3%), and Armenia (3.8%).

In the early 1990s, following the dissolution of the Soviet Union, violent separatist conflicts broke out in the autonomous region of Abkhazia and Tskhinvali Region. Many Ossetians living in Georgia left the country, mainly to Russia's North Ossetia. On the other hand, at least 160,000 Georgians left Abkhazia after the breakout of hostilities in 1993. Of the Meskhetian Turks who were forcibly relocated in 1944, only a tiny fraction returned to Georgia as of 2008.

In the 2024 Global Hunger Index, Georgia is one of 22 countries with a GHI score of less than 5. Differences between their scores are minimal. With a score under 5, Georgia has a level of hunger that is low.

=== Largest cities ===
Largest cities or towns in Georgia (country) 2014 General Population Census Main Results
Rank	Name	Administrative divisions of Georgia	Pop.
1	Tbilisi	Tbilisi	1 108 717
2	Batumi	Adjara	152 839
3	Kutaisi	Imereti	147 635
4	Rustavi	Kvemo Kartli	125 103
5	Gori	Shida Kartli	48 143
6	Zugdidi	Samegrelo-Zemo Svaneti	42 998
7	Poti	Samegrelo-Zemo Svaneti	41,465
8	Sokhumi	Abkhazia	39,100 (Note: Occupied city, estimated data)
9	Khashuri	Shida Kartli	33 627
10	Tskhinvali	Shida Kartli	30,000

=== Languages ===
The most widespread language group is the Kartvelian family, which includes Georgian, Svan, Mingrelian and Laz. The official language of Georgia is Georgian, with Abkhaz having official status within the autonomous region of Abkhazia. Georgian is the primary language of 85.1 per cent of the population, followed by 6.8 per cent speaking Azerbaijani, 3.5 per cent Armenian, 1.4 per cent Russian, and 3.2 per cent other languages.

=== Religion ===
Main religions (2024)
1. Orthodox Christian (82.0%)
2. Muslim (11.1%)
3. Armenian Apostolic (2.59%)
4. Roman Catholic (0.50%)
5. Others (3.76%)

Today, 82 percent of the population practices Eastern Orthodox Christianity, with the majority of these adhering to the national Georgian Orthodox Church. The Georgian Orthodox Church is one of the world's oldest Christian churches, and claims apostolic foundation by Saint Andrew. In the first half of the 4th century, Christianity was adopted as the state religion of Iberia (present-day eastern Georgia), following the missionary work of Saint Nino of Cappadocia. The Church gained autocephaly during the early Middle Ages; it was abolished during the Russian domination of the country, restored in 1917 and fully recognized by the Ecumenical Patriarchate of Constantinople in 1989.

The special status of the Georgian Orthodox Church is officially recognized in the Constitution of Georgia and the Concordat of 2002. While Georgia is officially a secular country where religious institutions operate separately from the state, the Concordat established the Georgian Orthodox Church as the only recognized church in Georgia, which means other religious institutions have to seek recognition as civil organizations.

Religious minorities of Georgia include Muslims (11.1 percent), Armenian Christians (2.6 percent) and Roman Catholics (0.5 percent). 0.6 percent of those recorded in the 2024 census declared themselves to be adherents of other religions, 2.7 percent refused or did not state their religion and 0.5 percent declared no religion at all.

Islam is represented by both Azerbaijani Shia Muslims (in the south-east), ethnic Georgian Sunni Muslims in Adjara, Chechen sub-ethnic group of Sunni Kists in the Pankisi Gorge, and Laz-speaking Sunni Muslims as well as Sunni Meskhetian Turks along the border with Turkey. In Abkhazia, a minority of the Abkhaz population is also Sunni Muslim. There are also smaller communities of Greek Muslims (of Pontic Greek origin) and Armenian Muslims, both of whom are descended from Ottoman-era converts to Turkish Islam from Eastern Anatolia who settled in Georgia following the Lala Mustafa Pasha's Caucasian campaign that led to the Ottoman conquest of the country in 1578. Georgian Jews trace the history of their community to the 6th century BC but due to immigration to Israel, by the early 2000s their numbers had dwindled to several thousand.

Despite the long history of religious harmony in Georgia, there have been instances of religious discrimination and violence against "nontraditional faiths", such as Jehovah's Witnesses, by followers of the defrocked Orthodox priest Basil Mkalavishvili.

In addition to traditional religious organizations, Georgia retains secular and irreligious segments of society (0.5 percent), as well as a significant portion of religiously affiliated individuals who do not actively practice their faith.

=== Education ===
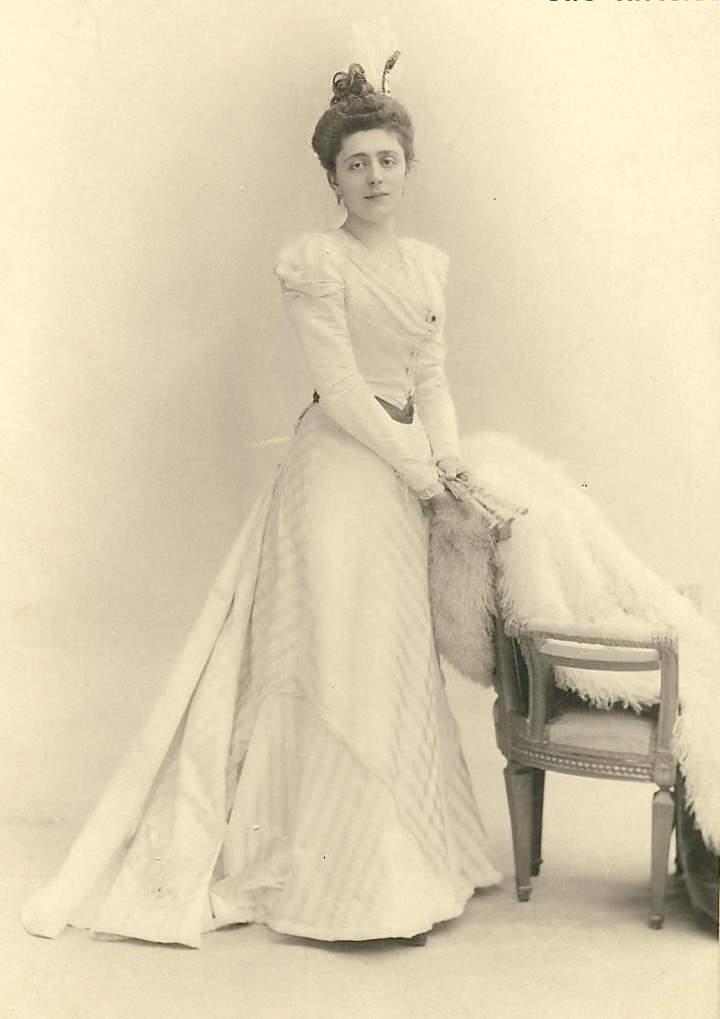
Elizabeth Orbeliani, Georgia's first woman professor and co-founder of Tbilisi State University in 1918

The education system of Georgia has undergone sweeping, though controversial, modernization since 2004. Education in Georgia is mandatory for all children aged 6–14. The school system is divided into elementary (six years; ages 6–12), basic (three years; ages 12–15), and secondary (three years; ages 15–18), or alternatively vocational studies (two years). Access to higher education is given to students who have gained a secondary school certificate. Only those students who have passed the Unified National Examinations may enrol in a state-accredited higher education institution, based on ranking of the scores received at the exams.

Most of these institutions offer three levels of study: a bachelor's programme (three to four years); a master's programme (two years), and a doctoral programme (three years). There is also a certified specialist's programme that represents a single-level higher education programme lasting from three to six years. As of 2016, 75 higher education institutions are accredited by the Ministry of Education and Science of Georgia. Gross primary enrolment ratio was 117 percent for the period of 2012–2014, the 2nd highest in Europe after Sweden.

Tbilisi has become the main artery of the Georgian educational system, particularly since the creation of the First Georgian Republic in 1918 permitted the establishment of modern, Georgian-language educational institutions. Tbilisi is home to several major institutions of higher education in Georgia, notably the Tbilisi State Medical University, which was founded as Tbilisi Medical Institute in 1918, and the Tbilisi State University (TSU), which was established in 1918 and remains the oldest university in the entire Caucasus region. The number of faculty and staff (collaborators) at TSU is approximately 5,000, with over 35,000 students enrolled. The following four universities are also located in Tbilisi: Georgian Technical University, which is Georgia's main and largest technical university, The University of Georgia (Tbilisi), as well as Caucasus University and Free University of Tbilisi.

== Culture ==
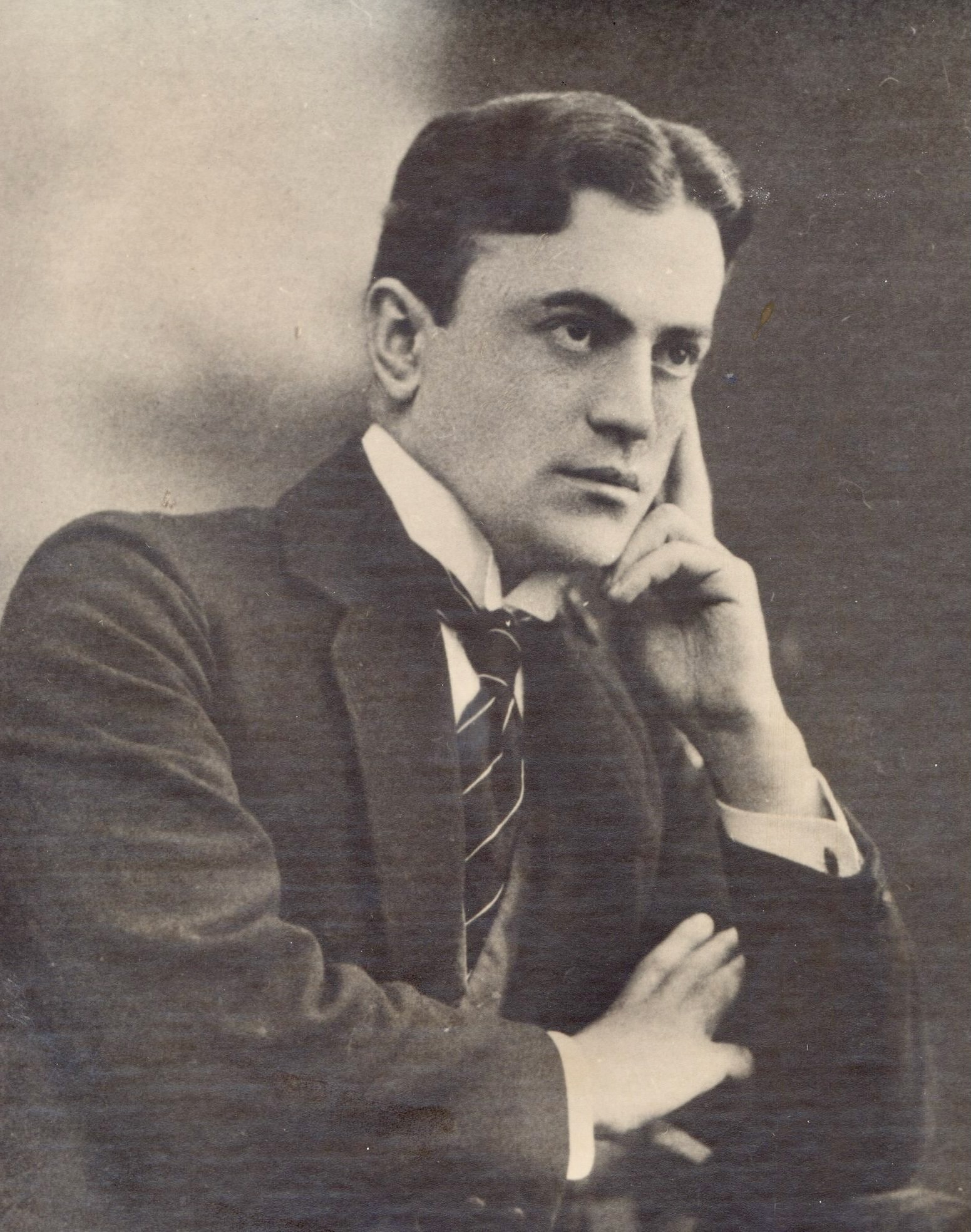
Sandro Akhmeteli, Georgia's preeminent theater director and a critic of the Great Terror.

Georgian culture evolved over thousands of years from its foundations in the Iberian and Colchian civilizations. Georgian culture enjoyed a renaissance and golden age of classical literature, arts, philosophy, architecture and science in the 11th century. Georgian culture was influenced by Classical Greece, the Roman Empire, the Byzantine Empire, the various Iranian empires (notably the Achaemenid, Parthian, Sassanian, Safavid, and Qajar empires), and later, since the 19th century, by the Russian Empire and the Soviet Union.

This long history has provided a national narrative which encompasses the successful preservation of unique culture and identity in a consistent territory, despite external pressures. Christianity and the Georgian language are particularly important national identifiers. These cultural, religious, and later political attributes are associated with a European and Western identity, based on a national perception of these attributes that contrasts with surrounding powers. This self-identity is stronger among the dominant ethnic Georgian population than in the country's minority groups.

Georgia is known for its folklore, traditional music, dances, theatre, cinema, and art. Notable painters from the 20th century include Niko Pirosmani, Lado Gudiashvili, Elene Akhvlediani; notable ballet choreographers include George Balanchine, Vakhtang Chabukiani, and Nino Ananiashvili; notable poets include Galaktion Tabidze, Lado Asatiani, and Mukhran Machavariani; and notable theatre and film directors include Robert Sturua, Tengiz Abuladze, Giorgi Danelia, and Otar Ioseliani.

=== Architecture and arts ===
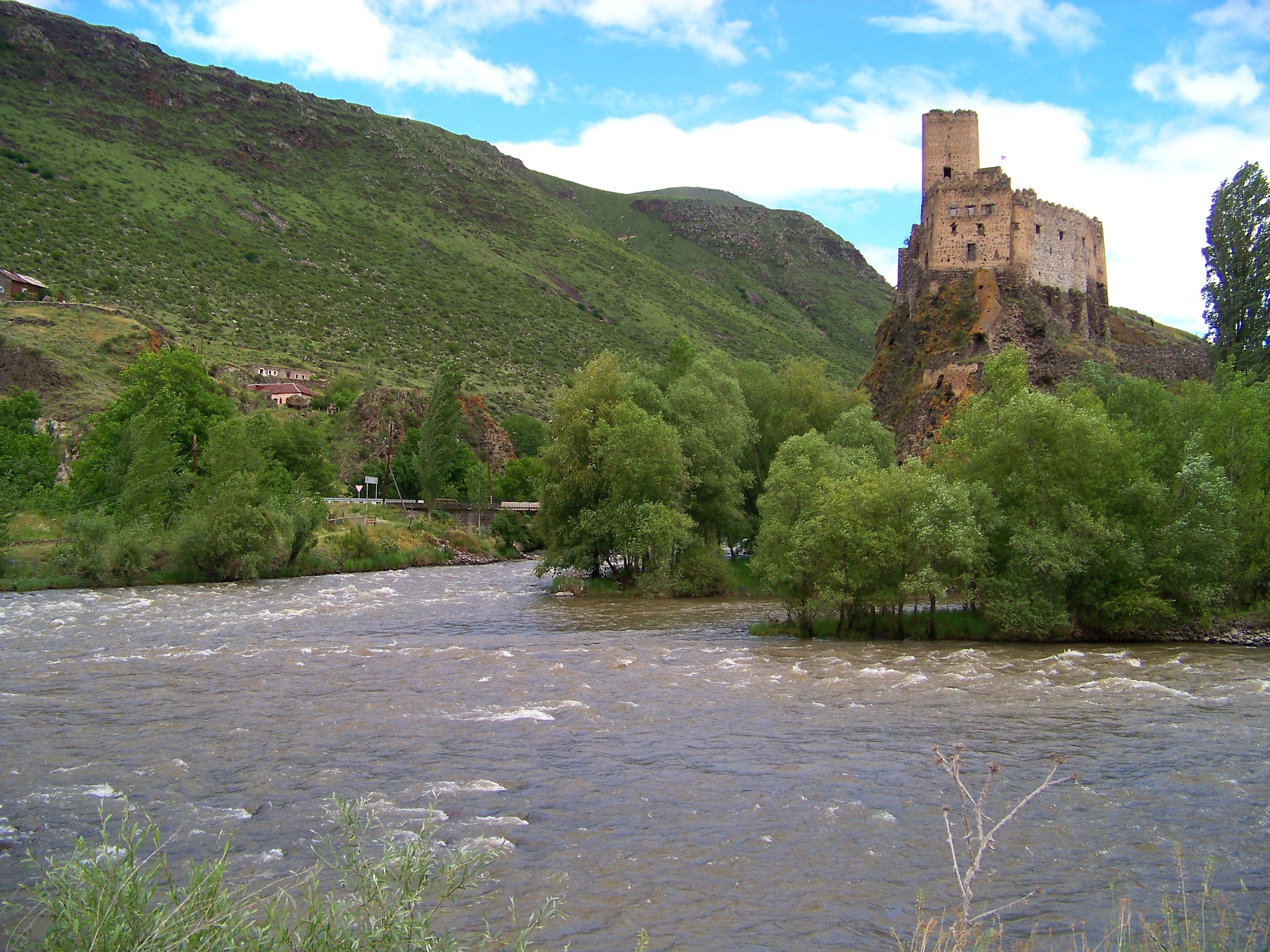
Khertvisi Fortress, an example of medieval Georgian architecture

Georgian architecture has been influenced by many civilizations. There are several architectural styles for castles, towers, fortifications and churches. The Upper Svaneti fortifications, and the castle town of Shatili in Khevsureti, are some of the finest examples of medieval Georgian castle architecture. Other architectural features of Georgia include Rustaveli Avenue in Tbilisi and the Old Town District.

Georgian ecclesiastic art is one of the most notable aspects of Georgian Christian architecture, which combines the classical dome style with the original basilica style, forming what is known as the Georgian cross-dome style. Cross-dome architecture developed in Georgia during the 9th century; before that, most Georgian churches were basilicas. Other examples of Georgian ecclesiastic architecture can be found outside Georgia: Bachkovo Monastery in Bulgaria (built in 1083 by the Georgian military commander Grigorii Bakuriani), Iviron monastery in Greece (built by Georgians in the 10th century), and the Monastery of the Cross in Jerusalem (built by Georgians in the 9th century). One of the most famous late 19th/early 20th century Georgian artists was primitivist painter Niko Pirosmani.

=== Literature ===
The Georgian language, and the Classical Georgian literature of the poet Shota Rustaveli, were revived in the 19th century after a long period of turmoil, laying the foundations of the romantics and novelists of the modern era such as Grigol Orbeliani, Nikoloz Baratashvili, Ilia Chavchavadze, Akaki Tsereteli, and Vazha-Pshavela. The Georgian language is written in three unique scripts which, according to traditional accounts, were invented by King Pharnavaz I of Iberia in the 3rd century BC.

=== Media ===
Television, magazines, and newspapers in Georgia are all operated by both state-owned and for-profit corporations which depend on advertising, subscription, and other sales-related revenues. The Constitution of Georgia guarantees freedom of speech. The media environment of Georgia remains the freest and most diverse in the South Caucasus, despite the long-term politicization and polarization affecting the sector. The political struggle for control over the public broadcaster has left it without a direction in 2014 too.

=== Music ===
Georgia has an ancient musical tradition, which is primarily known for its early development of polyphony. Georgian polyphony is based on three vocal parts, a unique tuning system based on perfect fifths, and a harmonic structure rich in parallel fifths and dissonances. Three types of polyphony have developed in Georgia: a complex version in Svaneti, a dialogue over a bass background in the Kakheti region, and a three-part partially improvised version in western Georgia. The Georgian folk song "Chakrulo" was one of 27 musical compositions included on the Voyager Golden Records that were sent into space on Voyager 2 on 20 August 1977.

=== Cuisine ===
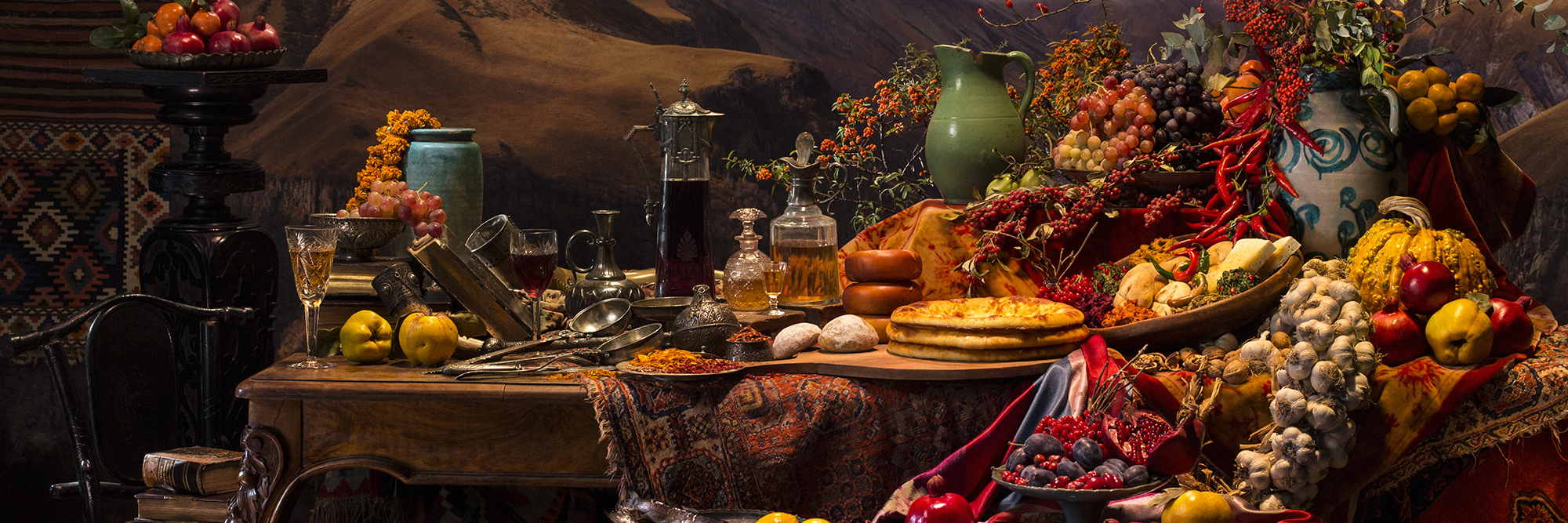
Rather than serving food in courses, traditional supras often present all that a host has to offer.

Georgian cuisine and wine have evolved through the centuries, adapting traditions in each era. One of the most unusual traditions of dining is supra, or Georgian table, which is also a way of socializing with friends and family. The head of supra is known as tamada. He also conducts the highly philosophical toasts, and makes sure that everyone is enjoying themselves. Various historical regions of Georgia are known for their particular dishes: for example, khinkali (meat dumplings), from eastern mountainous Georgia, and khachapuri, mainly from Imereti, Samegrelo and Adjara.

=== Wine ===
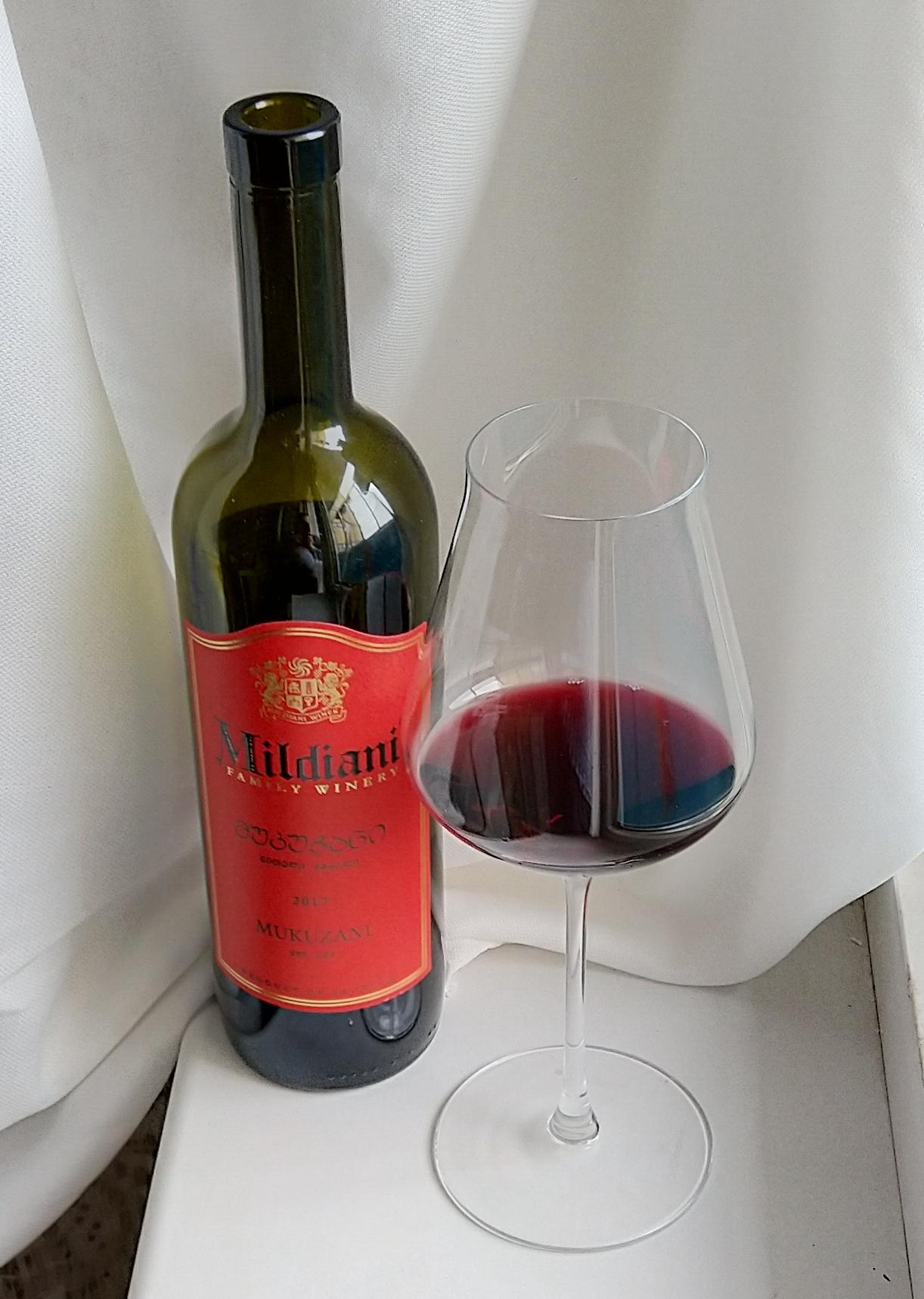
A glass of Mukuzani. Wine-making is a traditional component of the Georgian economy.

Georgia is one of the oldest wine-producing countries in the world. Archaeology indicates that fertile valleys and slopes in and around Georgia have been home to grapevine cultivation and neolithic wine production (Georgian: ღვინო, ɣvino) for millennia. Local traditions associated with wine are entwined with its national identity. In 2013, UNESCO added the ancient traditional Georgian winemaking method using the Kvevri clay jars to the UNESCO Intangible Cultural Heritage Lists.

Georgia's moderate climate and moist air, influenced by the Black Sea, provide the best conditions for vine cultivation. The soil in vineyards is so intensively cultivated that the grapevines grow up the trunks of fruit trees, eventually hanging down along the fruit when they ripen. This method of cultivation is called maglari. Among the best-known Georgian wine regions are Kakheti (further divided into the micro-regions of Telavi and Kvareli), Kartli, Imereti, Racha-Lechkhumi and Kvemo Svaneti, Adjara and Abkhazia.

Georgian wine has been a contentious issue in recent relationships with Russia. Political tensions with Russia have contributed to the 2006 Russian embargo of Georgian wine, Russia claimed Georgia produced counterfeit wine. It was an "official" reason, but the instability of economic relations with Russia is well known, as they use the economic ties for political purposes. Counterfeiting problems stem from mislabelling by foreign producers and falsified "Georgian Wine" labels on wines produced outside of Georgia and imported into Russia under the auspices of being Georgian produced. The shipment of counterfeit wine has been primarily channelled through Russian managed customs checkpoints in Russian-occupied Georgian territories Abkhazia and South Ossetia, where no inspection and regulation occurs.

=== Sports ===
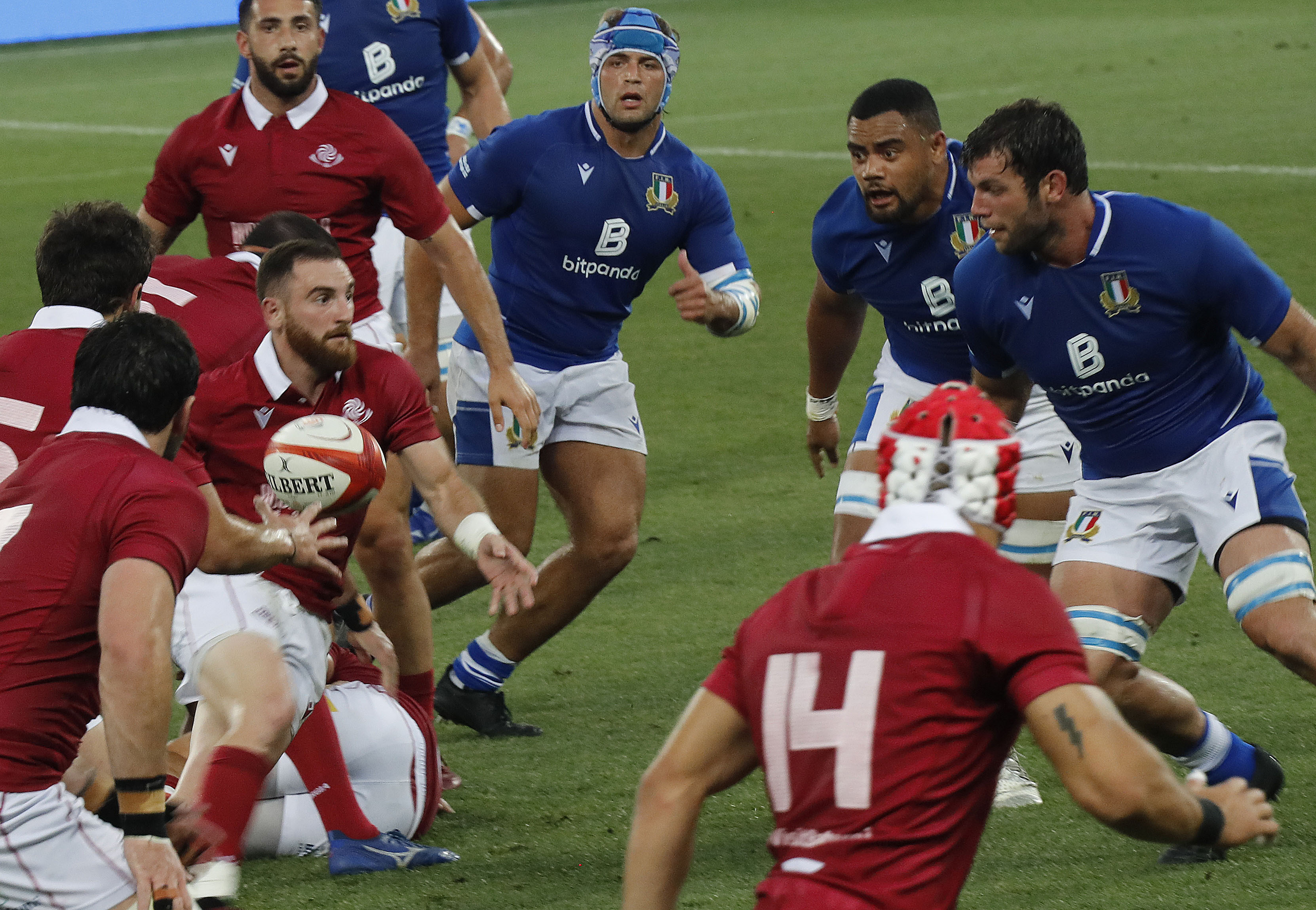
Georgia playing Italy at rugby in the Adjarabet Arena in Batumi

The most popular sports in Georgia are football, basketball, rugby union, wrestling, judo, and weightlifting. Rugby is considered Georgia's national sport. Historically, Georgia has been famous for its physical education; the Romans were fascinated with Georgians' physical qualities after seeing the training techniques of ancient Iberia. Wrestling remains a historically important sport of Georgia, and some historians think that the Greco-Roman style of wrestling incorporates many Georgian elements.

Within Georgia, one of the most popularized styles of wrestling is the Kakhetian style. There were a number of other styles in the past that are not as widely used today. For example, the Khevsureti region of Georgia has three styles of wrestling. Other popular sports in 19th century Georgia were polo, and Lelo, a traditional Georgian game very similar to rugby.

The first and only race circuit in the Caucasian region is located in Georgia. Rustavi International Motorpark originally built in 1978, was re-opened in 2012 after total reconstruction costing $20 million. The track satisfies the FIA Grade 2 requirements and currently hosts the Legends car racing series and Formula Alfa competitions.

Basketball was always one of the notable sports in Georgia, and Georgia had a few very famous Soviet Union national team members, such as Otar Korkia, Mikheil Korkia, Zurab Sakandelidze and Levan Moseshvili. Dinamo Tbilisi won the prestigious EuroLeague competition in 1962. Georgia has had five players in the NBA: Vladimir Stepania, Jake Tsakalidis, Nikoloz Tskitishvili, Tornike Shengelia and former Golden State Warriors centre Zaza Pachulia. Other notable basketball players include the two time EuroLeague champion Giorgi Shermadini and EuroLeague players Manuchar Markoishvili and Viktor Sanikidze. The sport is regaining its popularity in the country recently, and the Georgia national basketball team has qualified for the EuroBasket tournament five consecutive times since its first appearance in 2011.

There are a number of world-class Georgian MMA fighters. Ilia Topuria, Merab Dvalishvili, Giga Chikadze and Roman Dolidze are highly ranked fighters currently signed with the UFC.

Georgian athletes have won a total of 40 Olympic medals, mostly in wrestling, judo and weightlifting. Competitive bodybuilding sanctioned by the European IFBB is also popular in the country.

== See also ==
- Outline of Georgia (country)
