= Tower house =

Type of stone structure, built for defensive and habitation purposes

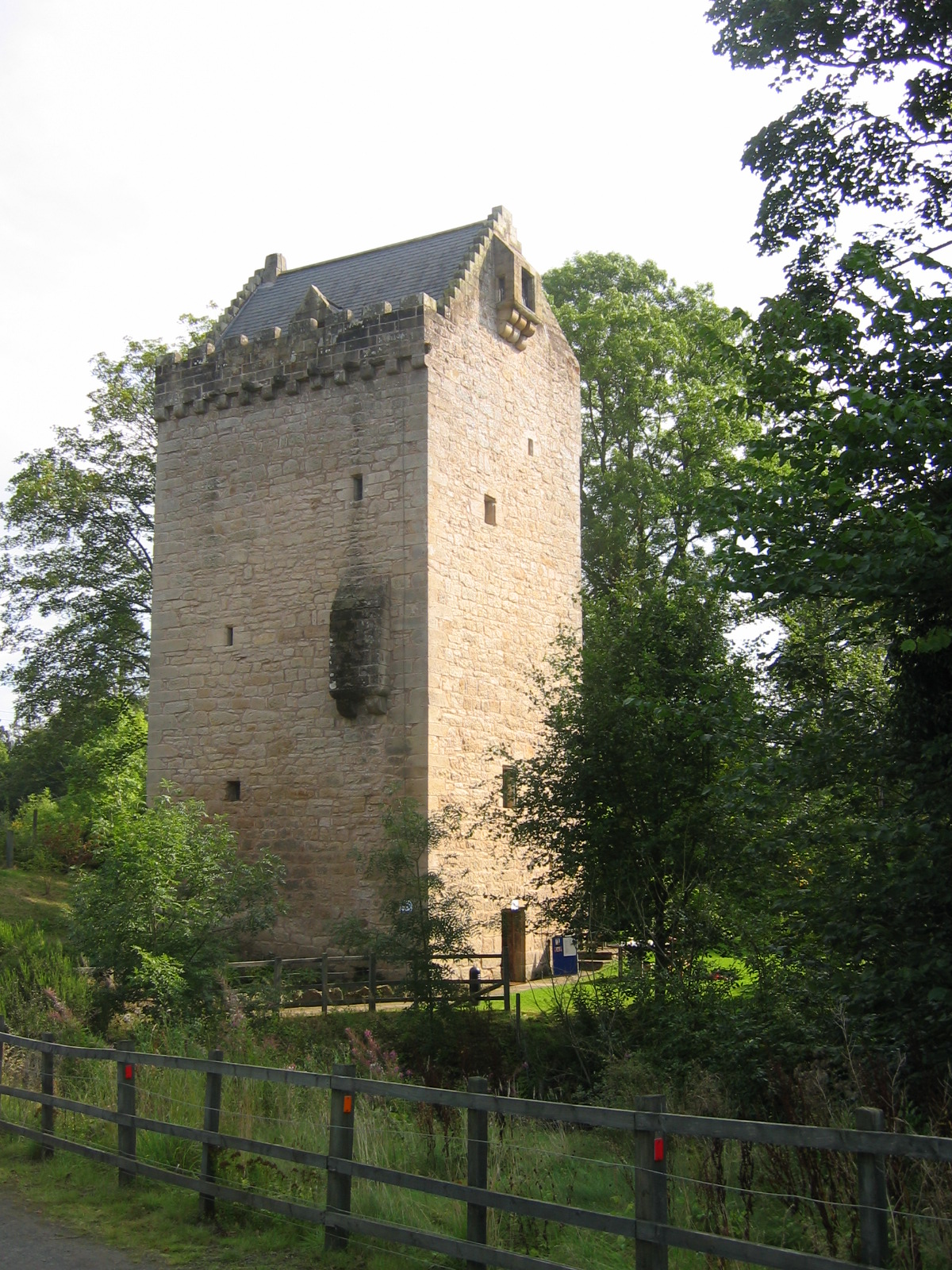
The Tower of Hallbar in South Lanarkshire, Scotland, UK

A tower house is a particular type of stone structure, built for defensive purposes as well as habitation. Tower houses began to appear in the Middle Ages, especially in mountainous or limited access areas, to command and defend strategic points with reduced forces. At the same time, they were also used as an aristocrat's residence, around which a castle town was often constructed.

== Europe ==
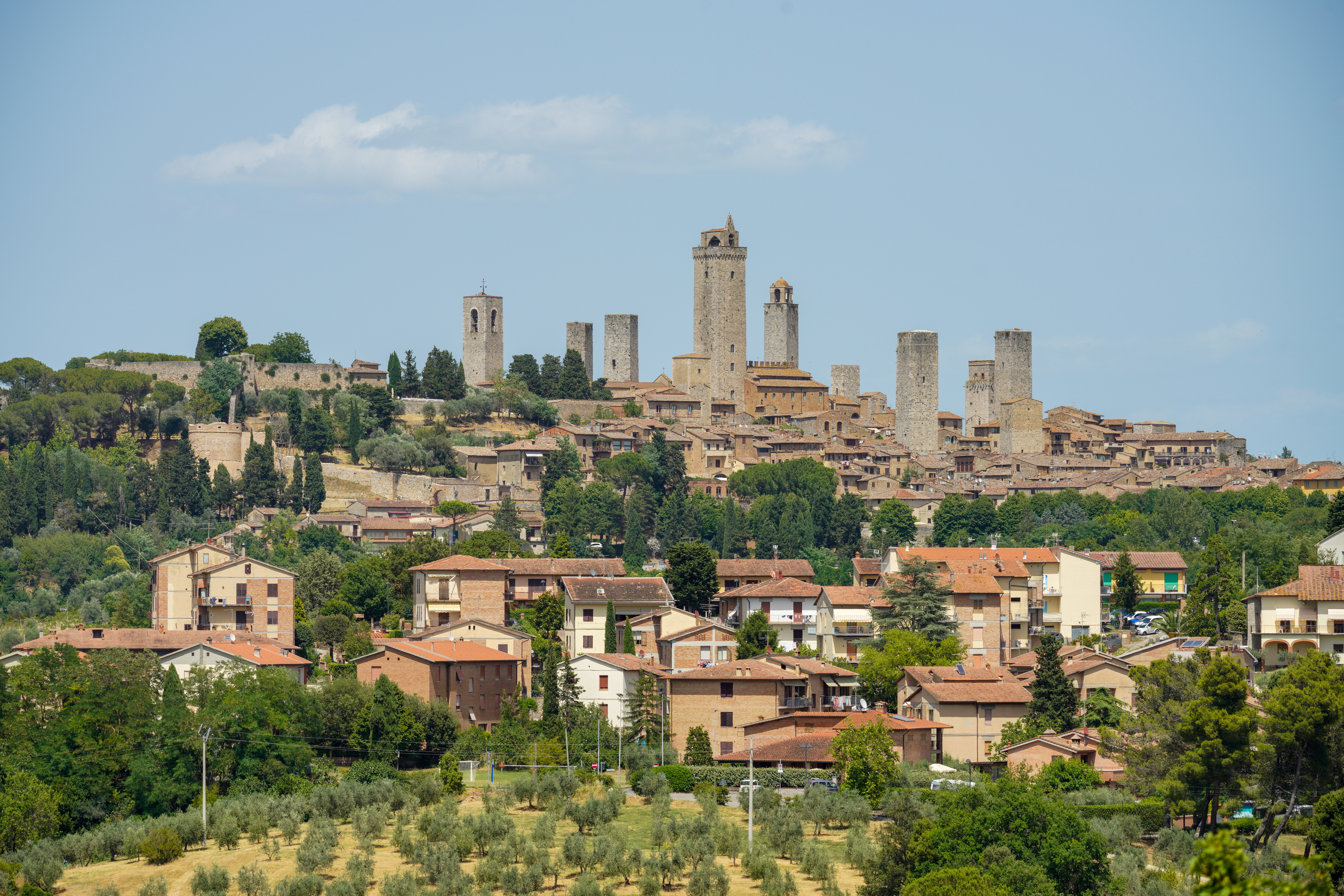
Towers of San Gimignano in Tuscany, Italy.

After their initial appearance in Ireland, Scotland, the Frisian lands, Northern Spain and England during the High Middle Ages, tower houses were also built in other parts of western Europe, especially in parts of France and Italy. In Italian medieval communes, urban palazzi with a very tall tower were increasingly built by the local highly competitive patrician families as power centres during times of internal strife. Most north Italian cities had a number of these by the end of the Middle Ages, but few now remain, notably two towers in Bologna, twenty towers in Pavia and fourteen secular towers in the small city of San Gimignano in Tuscany now the best group to survive.

Scotland has many fine examples of medieval tower houses, including Drum Castle, Craigievar Castle and Castle Fraser, and in the unstable Scottish Marches along the border between England and Scotland the peel tower was the typical residence of the wealthy, with others being built by the government. In 17th century Scotland these castles became the pleasure retreats of the upper classes. While able to adopt a military nature, they were furnished for comfort and social interaction.

Tower houses are commonly found in northern Spain, especially in Navarre and the Basque Country, some of them dating to the 8th century. They were mainly used as noble residences and were able to provide shelter against enemies, starting with the Muslims and later Aragón and Castile. Due to complex legal charters, few had boroughs attached to them, thus they are usually found standing alone in some strategic spot like a crossroad, rather than on a height. During the petty wars among the Basque nobles from 1379 to 1456, the upper floors (with defensive capacity) of most of them were demolished. Few have survived unscathed to the present day. Since then they have been used only as residences by their traditional noble owners (Saint Ignatius of Loyola was born in one of them, which stands to this day) or converted into farmhouses.

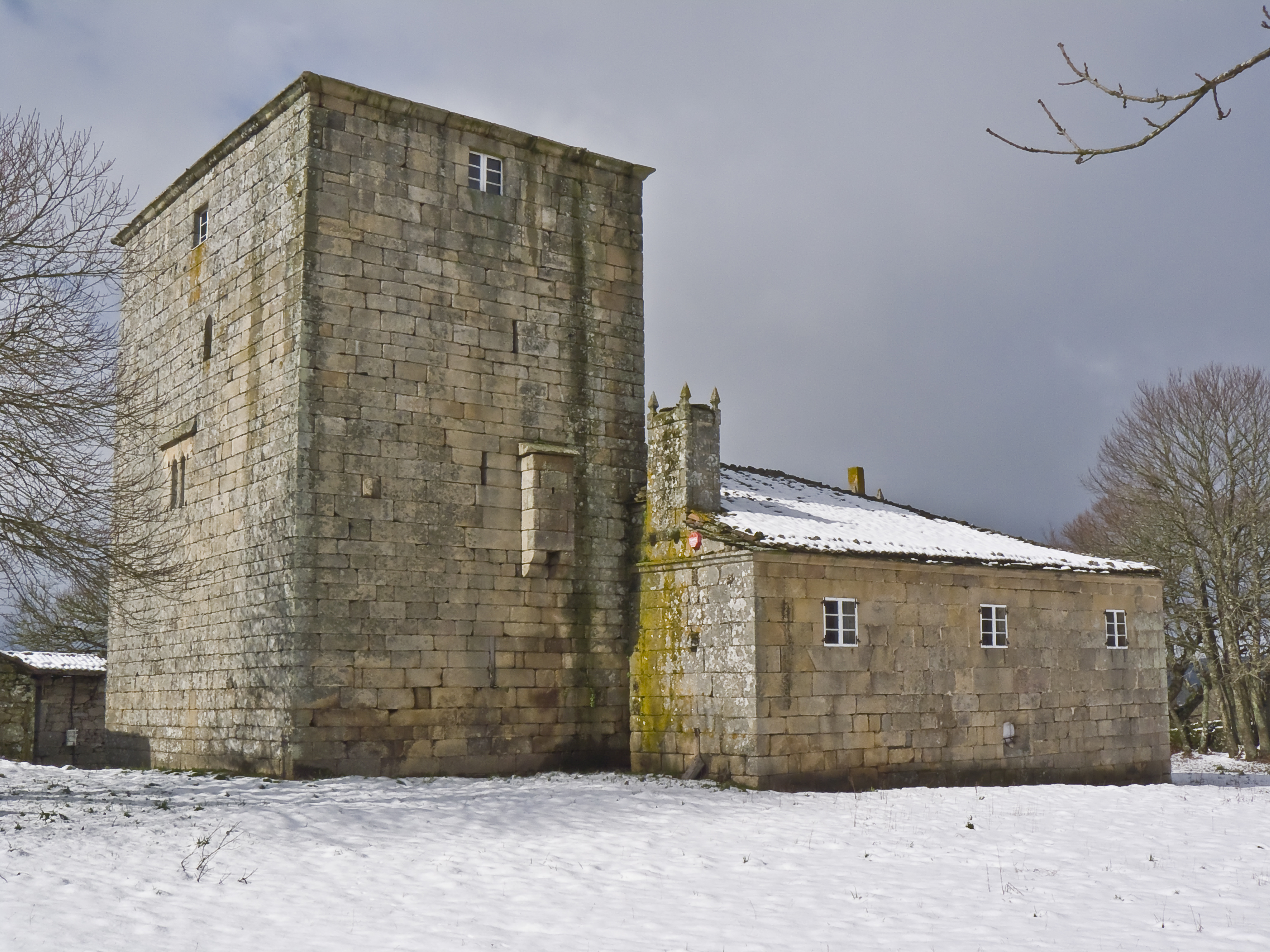
Pazo and tower, San Miguel das Penas, Galicia, Spain.

To the west of the Basque Country, in Cantabria and Asturias, similar tower houses are found. Furthest west in Spain, in Galicia, medieval tower houses are in the origin of many Modern Age pazos, noble residences as well as strongholds.

Large numbers of tower houses can be found across Portugal, particularly in the north of the country. By the 15th century they had lost their military or residential uses, and were often either expanded into larger manors or converted into hunting lodges for the aristocracy.

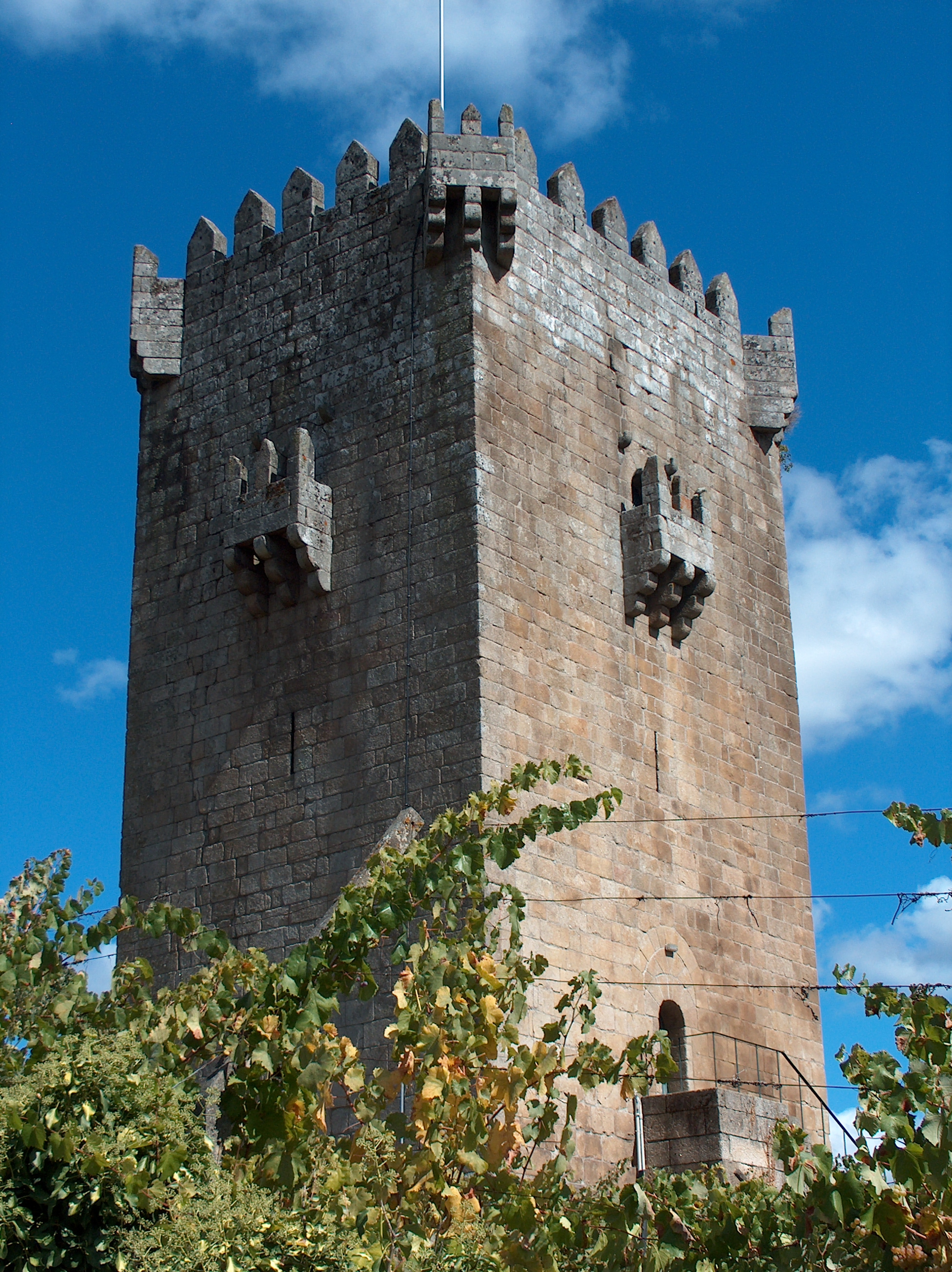
Quintela Tower Manor in Portugal.

A feature peculiar to Germany is the few preserved tower houses of Ratisbon, reminiscent of those in San Gimignano.

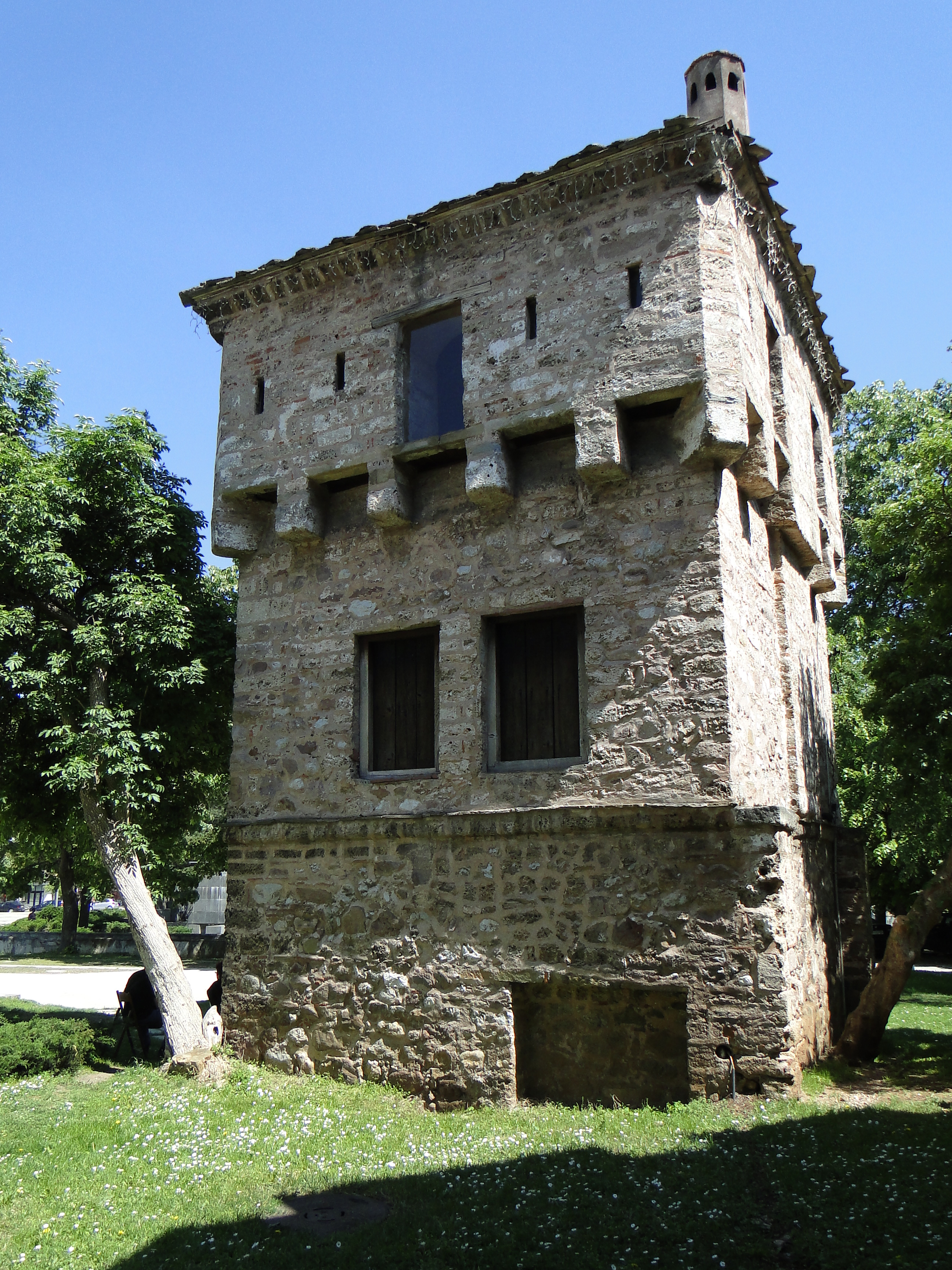
The 17th-century Tower of Kurt Pasha in Vratsa, Bulgaria

Distinctive tower houses were built in the Balkans since the Middle Ages. They became very widespread in the 17th century, built by both Christians and Muslims in a period of decline of Ottoman authority and insecurity. The tower house served the purpose of protecting the extended family.

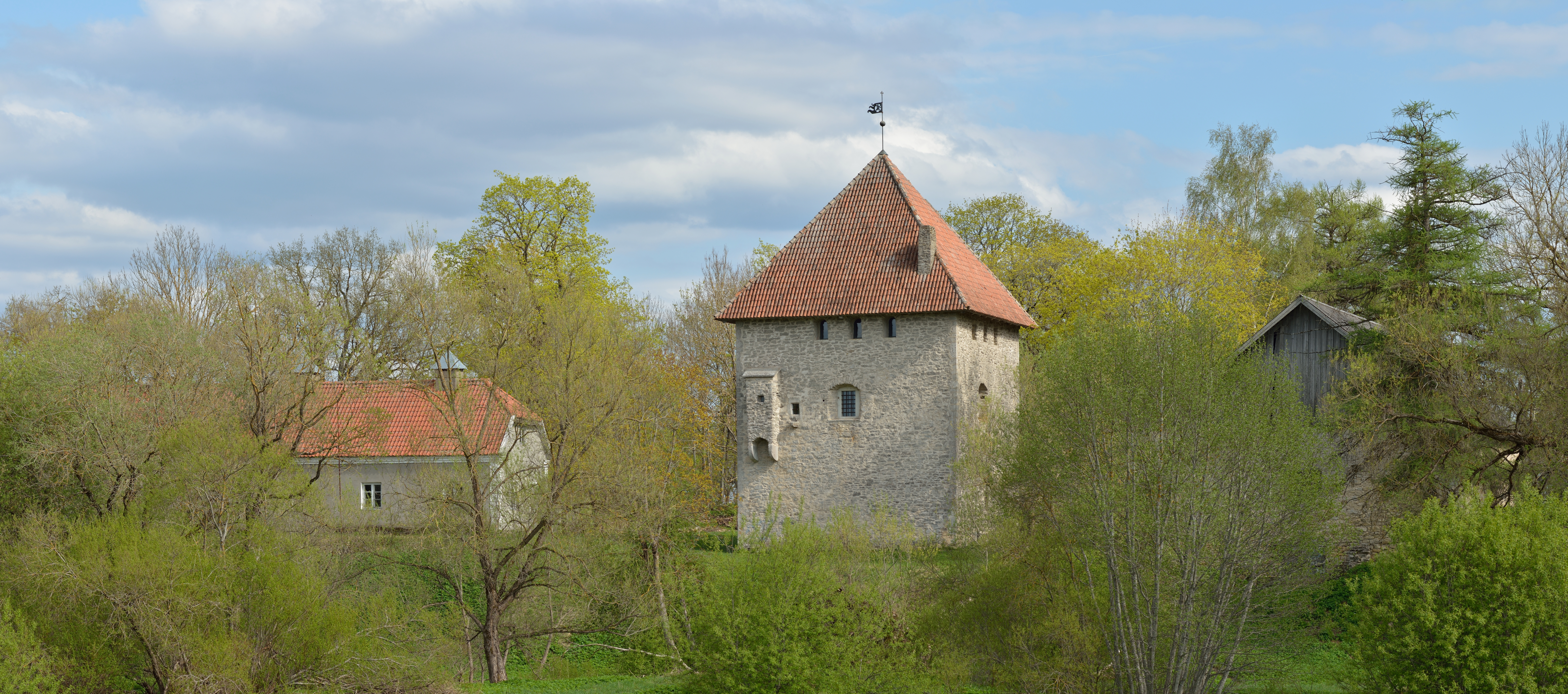
Vao tower house, Estonia

In the Baltic states, the Teutonic Order and other crusaders erected fortified tower houses in the Middle Ages, locally known as "vassal castles", as a means of exercising control over the conquered areas. These tower houses were typically not intended to be used in any major military actions. For this purpose, the crusaders relied on a number of larger order castles. A number of such tower houses still exist, well-preserved examples include Purtse, Vao and Kiiu castles in Estonia.

== Caucasus and Asia ==
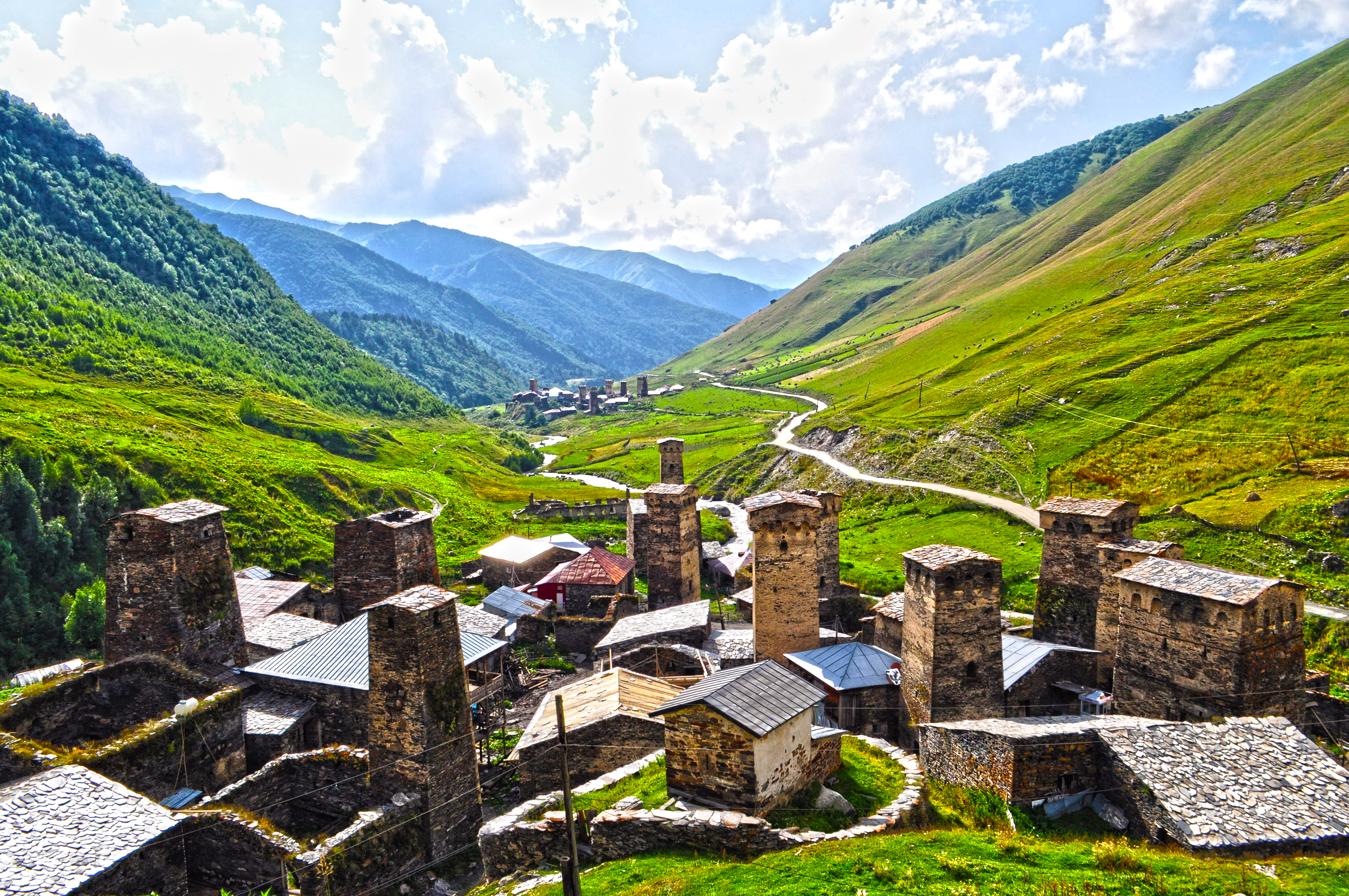
Svaneti tower houses in Ushguli

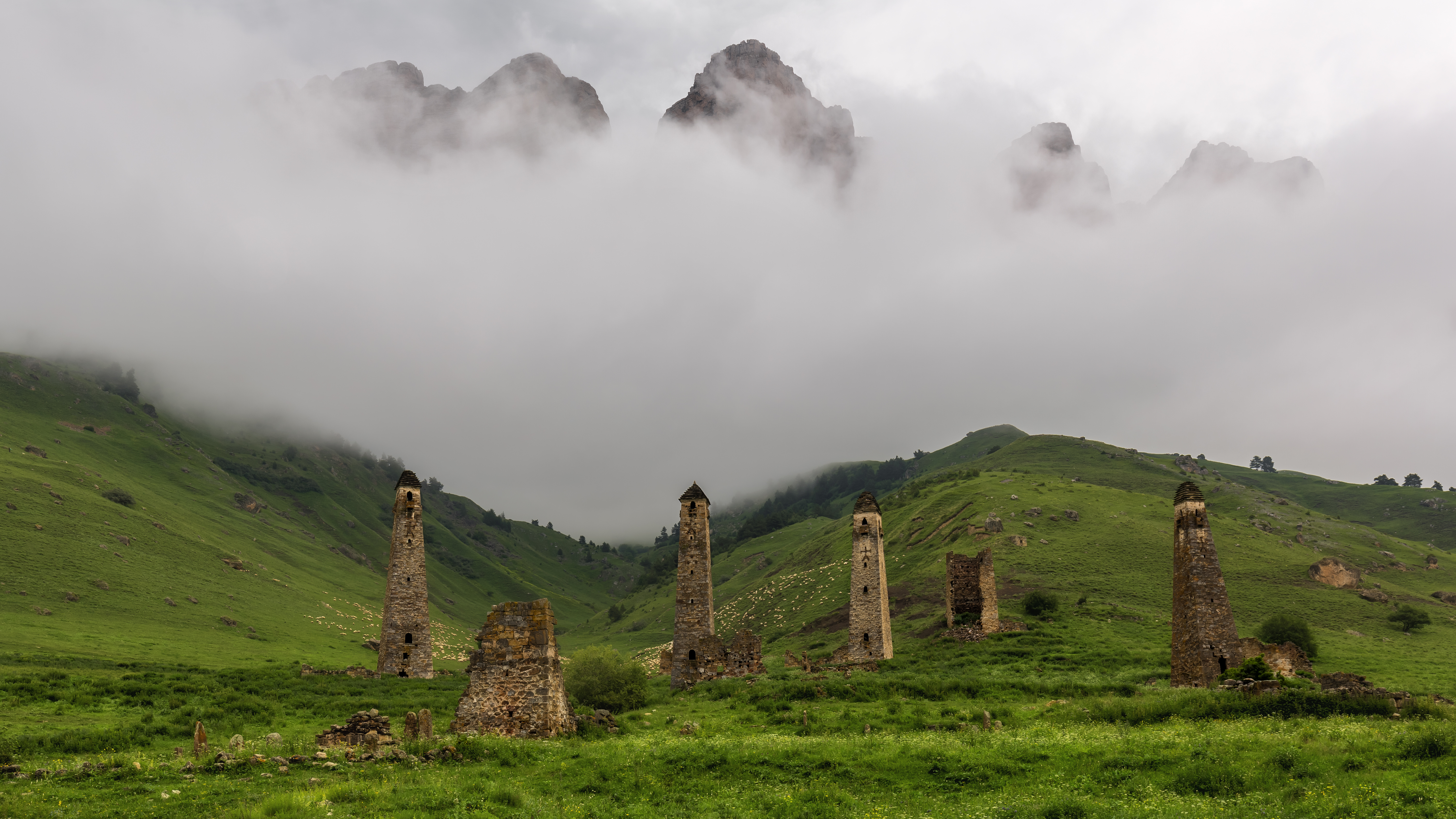
Vainakh tower architecture in Ingushetia, Russia

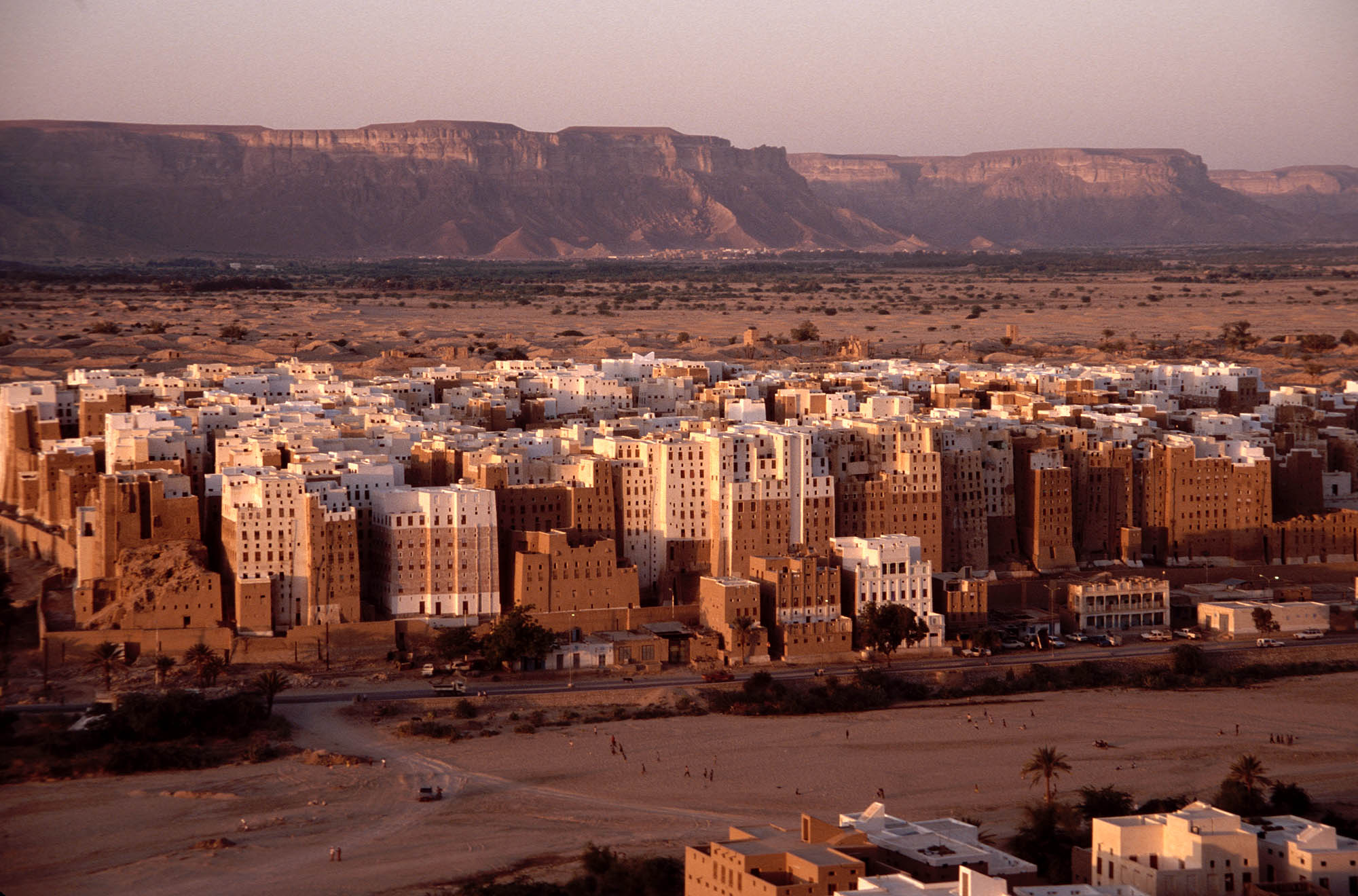
Old architecture in Shibam, Yemen

One theory suggests that private tower-like structures proliferate in areas where central authority is weak, leading to a need for a status symbol incorporating private defences against small-scale attacks. For example, the North Caucasus was a region where fierce competition over limited natural resources led to chronic feuding between neighbours. There are numerous examples of tower houses in Svaneti, Chechnya and Ingushetia, where a clan-like social structure survived well into the 20th century. Numerous examples of Svan tower houses are found in Chazhashi and Ushguli. See Vainakh tower architecture for details.

The Yemeni city of Shibam has hundreds of tower houses.

Similarly, hundreds of Tibetan tower houses dot the so-called Tribal Corridor in Western Sichuan, some 50 metres high with as many as 13 star-like points, and the oldest are thought to be 1,200 years old. They appear to have been created as much for prestige among village families as for defence.

Kaiping and some other towns in South China retain a plethora of watchtowers, or diaolous. Although they were built mainly as protection against forays by bandits, many of them also served as living quarters. Some of them were built by a single family, some by several families together or by entire village communities.

== North America ==
Most notable in the New World might be considered a focal element of the Mesa Verde Anasazi ruin in Colorado, United States. There is a prominent structure at that site which is called the "tower house" and has the general appearance characteristics of its counterparts in Britain and Ireland. This four-story building was constructed of adobe bricks circa 1350 AD, and its rather well-preserved ruins are nestled within a cliff overhang. Other accounts date this ruin somewhat earlier. The towers of the ancient Pueblo people are both of smaller ground plan than Old World tower houses, and are generally only parts of complexes housing communities, rather than isolated structures housing an individual family and their retainers, as in Europe.

== Literature ==
- Johnson Westropp, Thomas (1899). "Notes on the Lesser Castles or 'Peel Towers' of the County Clare". Proceedings of the Royal Irish Academy. 20: 348–365. JSTOR 20490552.
- Greville Pounds, Norman John (27 May 1994). The Culture of the English People: Iron Age to the Industrial Revolution. Cambridge University Press. ISBN 9780521466714.
- Ernst J. Grube, George Michell (1978). Architecture of the Islamic world: its history and social meaning, with a complete survey of key monuments. Morrow. ISBN 9780688033248.
