= Adishi (village) =

Adishi Georgian: ადიში
- Village
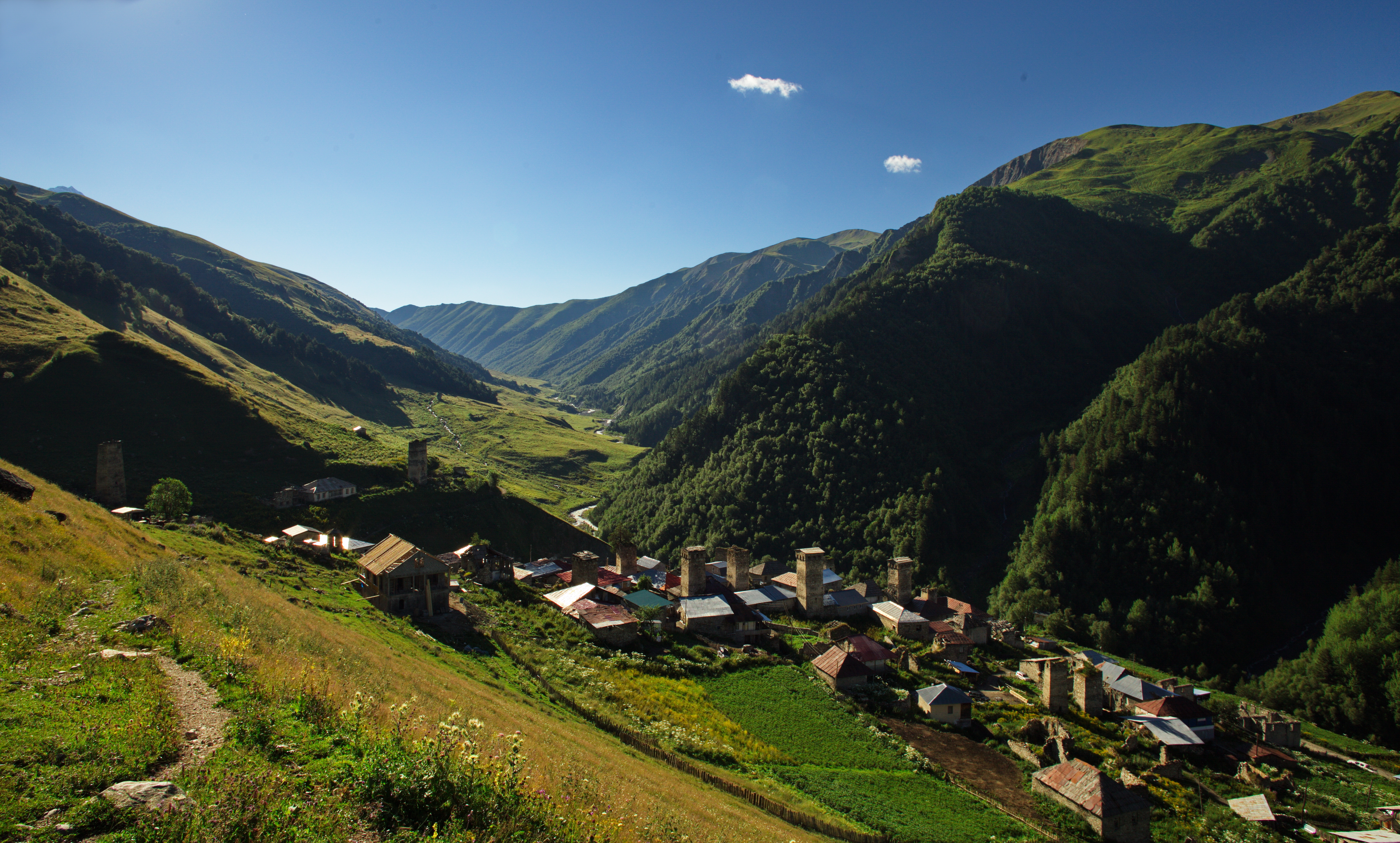

- Location in Georgia Adishi (Georgia)
- Coordinates: 42°59′47″N 42°54′53″E
- Country: (Georgia (country)) Georgia
- Region: Samegrelo-Zemo Svaneti
- Municipality: Mestia Municipality
- Elevation: 2,040 m (6,690 ft)

Population (2014)
  - Total: 44
- Time zone: UTC+4 (Georgian Time)

Adishi (Adysh, Hadysh; Georgian: ადიში) is a highland village, 2,040 metres above sea level, in the Mestia Municipality of Samegrelo-Zemo Svaneti region of Georgia. According to the data of 2014, 44 people live in the village. Village is 27 kilometres from the town of Mestia.

== History ==
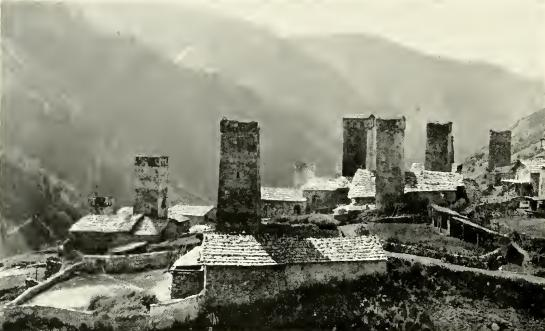
Adishi. A photography by the Hungarian explorer Moriz von Déchy, c. 1905.

The landscape of the village is dominated by a number of medieval monuments, and the Greater Caucasus mountains. The important cultural sites of Adishi are: the Church of the Deliverer (10th–11th centuries), two churches of St George (12th century), the Church of the Archangel (12th century) and several typical Svanetian towers.

The well-known Adysh Gospels (AD 897) was preserved here for centuries.

== See also ==
- Samegrelo-Zemo Svaneti
