= 1987 Svaneti avalanches =

Series of avalanches in Georgia

The 1987 Svaneti avalanches was a series of massive avalanches in the northwest Caucasus highlands of the then-Soviet republic of Georgia, which hit, in January 1987, the country's Svaneti province, namely the Mestia and Lentekhi districts.

The avalanches were brought about by unprecedented snowfall which lasted for 46 days, falling 16 meters thick at several places. From 9 to 31 January 1987 330 avalanches were registered. The mountainous villages such as Chuberi, Ushguli, Mulakhi, Kala, and Khaishi were heavily hit. The village of Zhamushi was entirely buried in snow, with 26 killed. In total, 105 people died in the disaster. More than 2,000 houses were damaged and about 8,500 people had to be resettled. The total damage caused was about $300 million.
