= Chazhashi =

Chazhashi ჩაჟაში
- Village
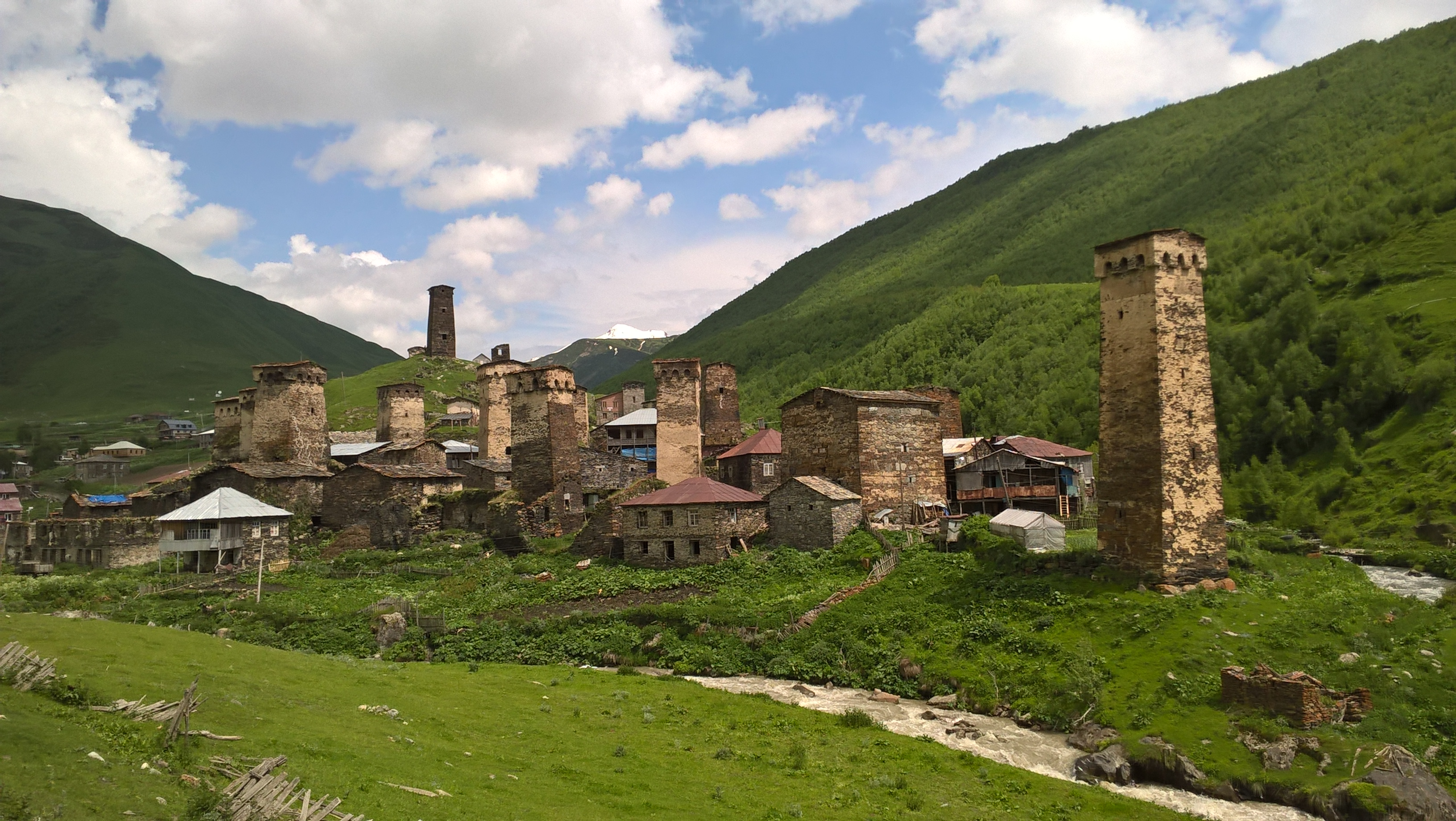
- Chazhashi in 2016

- Location of Chazhashi
- Coordinates: 42°54′54″N 43°0′31″E
- Country: Georgia
- Region: Samegrelo-Zemo Svaneti
- Municipality: Mestia
- Elevation: 2,160 m (7,090 ft)

Population (2014)
  - Total: 28
- Time zone: UTC+4

UNESCO World Heritage Site
- Official name: Upper Svaneti
- Criteria: Cultural: (iv)(v)
- Reference: 709
- Inscription: 1996 (20th Session)
- Area: 1.06 ha (2.6 acres)
- Buffer zone: 19.16 ha (47.3 acres)

Chazhashi (Georgian: ჩაჟაში [ˈt͡ʃʰäʒäʃi]) is a village in the Mestia Municipality, Samegrelo-Zemo Svaneti, Georgia. It is located in the southern foothills of the Greater Caucasus mountains, in the upper Enguri River valley, at the elevation of 2,160 m above sea level. The village is part of the historical region of Svaneti and center of the Ushguli community. Its medieval fortified structures are inscribed on the registry of Georgia's Immovable Cultural Monuments of National Significance and listed as a UNESCO World Heritage Site as part of the Upper Svaneti entity.

== Geography ==
Chazhashi is the main settlement of Ushguli, a conglomeration of four villages and one of the highest inhabited places in Europe. Under Georgia's current subdivision, it is part of the Mestia Municipality, located some 45 km east of the municipal center, the town of Mestia, at the confluence of the Enguri and Shavtskala rivers.

== Cultural heritage ==
Chazhashi is home to dozens of structures dating from the medieval and early modern periods of the history of Georgia, namely, its northwestern highland province of Svaneti. Of these are 13 well-preserved Svanetian tower houses—a typically three- to five-floor structures attached to the family houses—as well as four medieval castles, including one called Tamar's Castle in reference to the queen-regnant Tamar of Georgia (r. 1184–1213), who is believed by local folk tradition to have used it as her summertime residence. There are also two stone churches and several accessory buildings. The churches, one named St. George (Jgrag) and the other named the Lamaria (after the goddess Lamaria in Savneti mythology), date from the 10th and 11th–12th centuries, respectively. The former is part of the Tamar Castle; the latter is frescoed. Several monuments of Chazhashi were damaged by a massive avalanche in January 1987. Beginning in 2000, the Georgian government and the National Committee of the International Council on Monuments and Sites (ICOMOS Georgia), presided over multidisciplinary research of the village's cultural heritage and restoration and conservation projects.

== Population ==
Chazhashi is a village, with the permanent population of only 28 persons, all Svans, an ethnic Georgian subgroup, as of the 2014 nationwide census.

Population	2002 census	2014 census
Total	34	28

== See also ==
- Svan towers
