= Bochorna =

Bochorna ბოჭორნა
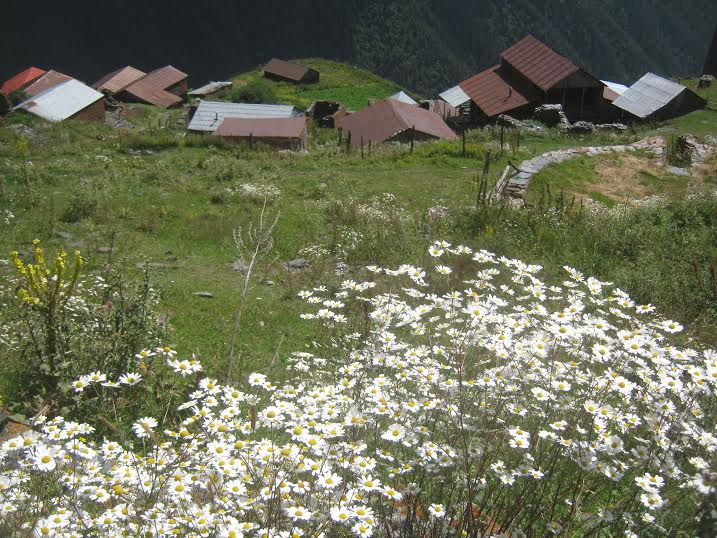
- Bochorna in 2016

- Location in Georgia
- Coordinates: 42°24′09″N 45°35′11″E
- Country: Georgia
- Region: Kakheti
- Municipality: Akhmeta
- Elevation: 2,345 m (7,694 ft)

Population (2014)
  - Total: 1
- Time zone: UTC+4

Bochorna (Georgian: ბოჭორნა) is a highland village in Akhmeta Municipality, northeast Georgia. Located in the Caucasus Mountains, at 2,345 metres (7,694 ft) above sea level, it is the highest inhabited place in the country and one of the highest in Europe. Bochorna had a permanent resident population of only one man at the time of the 2014 national census.

== Geography ==
Bochorna lies in the Gometsari gorge, on the southern slopes of the Makratela range, a spur of the Greater Caucasus crest, 80 kilometres (50 mi) northeast of the town of Akhmeta. According to the traditional subdivision of Georgia, the village is included in the Chaghma community of the province of Tusheti, part of the modern-day region (mkhare) of Kakheti and home to the Tush subgroup of Georgians, who have historically been involved in transhumant lifestyle of sheep farming. The environs are part of the Tusheti National Park.

== History ==
Bochorna, then known as Bochorma (ბოჭორმა), like many other highland hamlets in Tusheti, was an abandoned settlement at the time of the 2002 census, but was reported resettled—by one elderly man continuously and a few others in summer months—in the next national census of 2014. Thus, the government of Georgia restored the locale to a village status and announced it to be the "highest permanently inhabited place in Europe," a status hitherto claimed by the northwestern Georgian village of Ushguli.
