= Latsga =

- Location within Caucasus Mountains

Highest point
- Elevation: 4,019 m (13,186 ft)
- Coordinates: 43°10′24″N 42°47′49″E

Geography
- Location: Georgia and Russia
- Parent range: Greater Caucasus

Latsga (Georgian: ლაცგა) is a peak of the Greater Caucasus Mountain Range in the Svaneti region of Georgia adjacent to the Georgia–Russia border. Latsga's main glacier, Lekhzir, covers the mountain's southern slopes and portions of the adjacent valleys.
