= Svan towers =

Type of defense tower in Svaneti, Georgia

Coordinates: 42°54′59″N 43°00′41″E

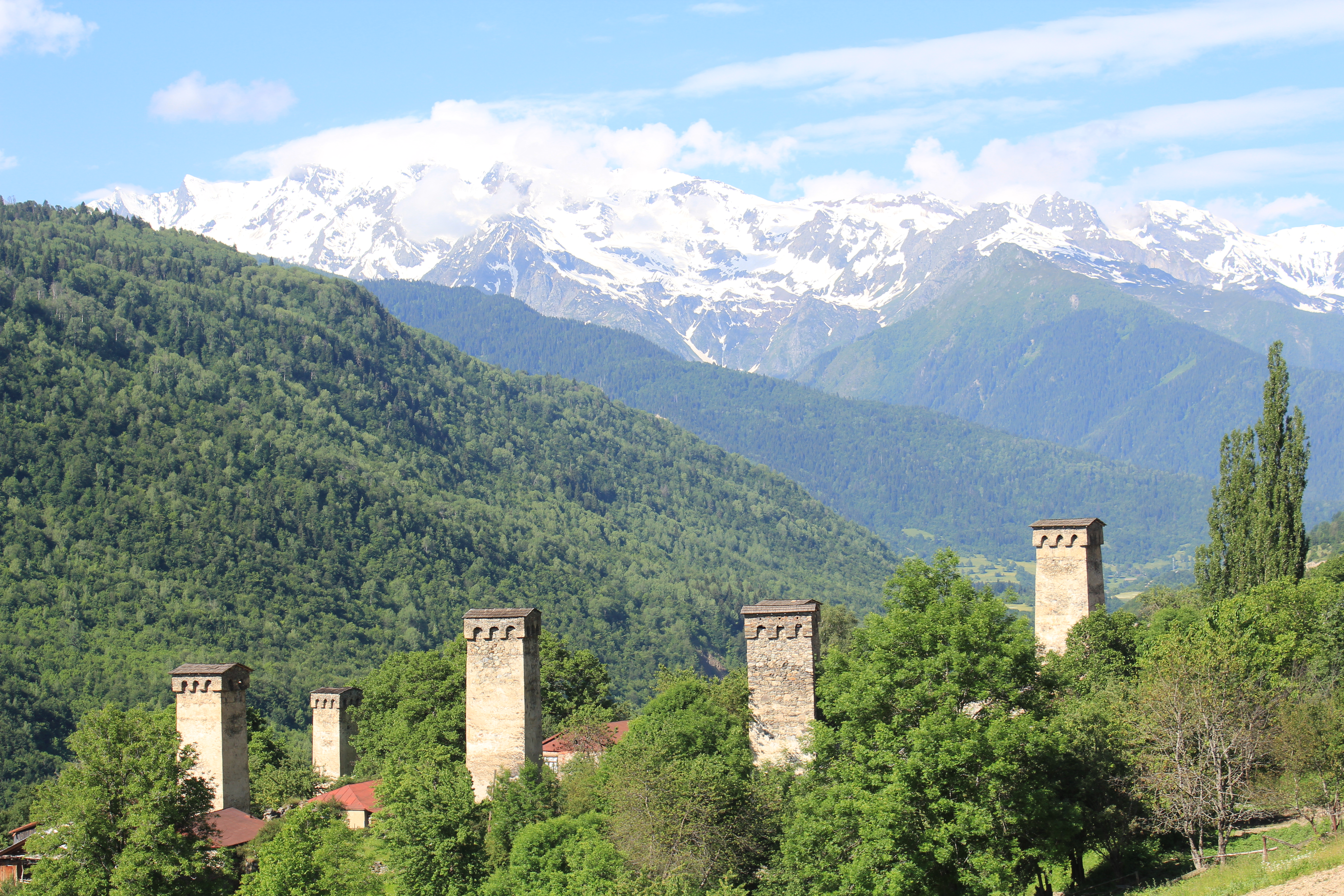
Svan towers near Mestia

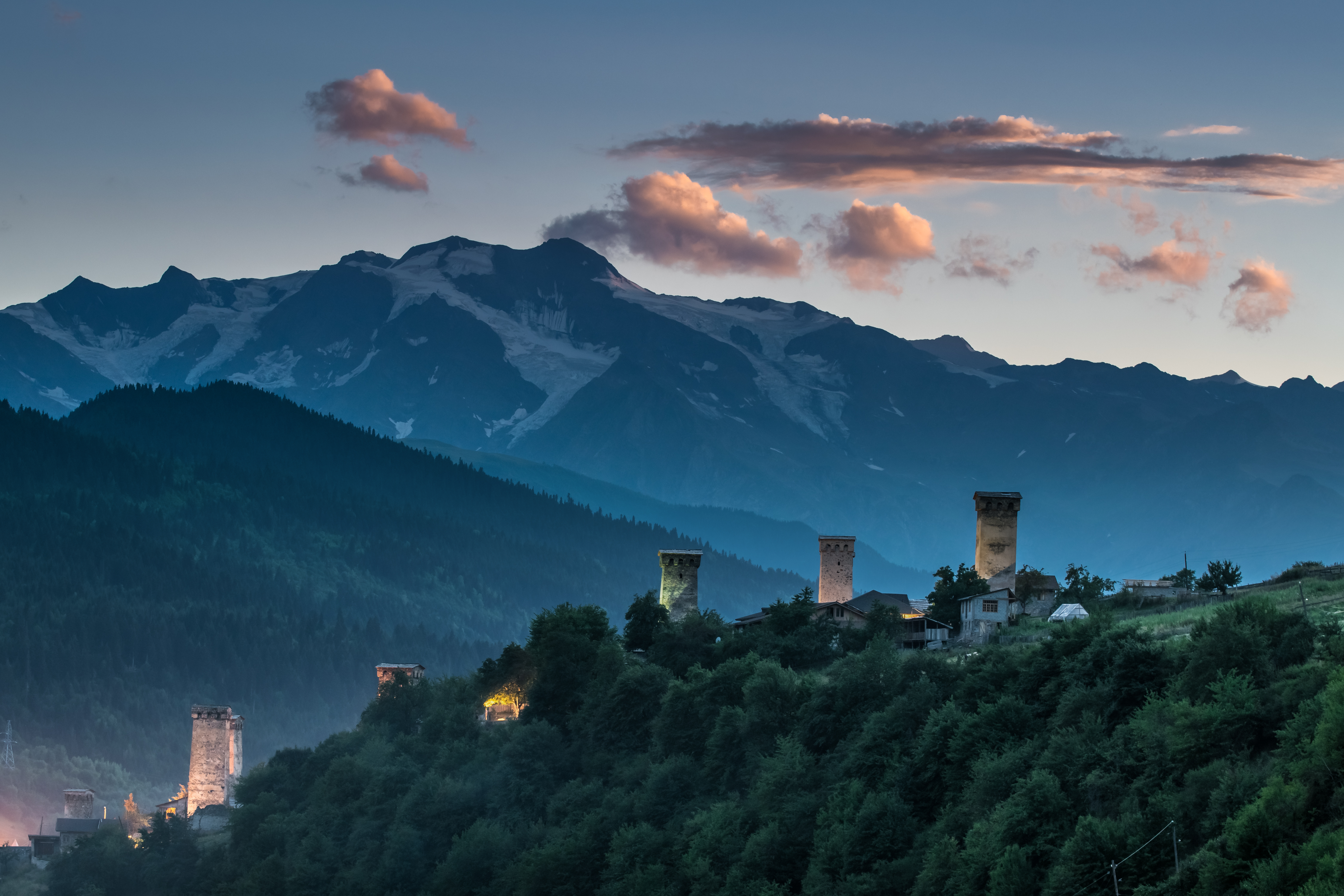
View of several Svan towers at dusk

Svan towers (Georgian: სვანური კოშკი, romanized: svanuri k'oshk'i) refers to the tower houses built as defensive dwellings in the Georgian historical region of Svaneti (present-day Samegrelo-Zemo Svaneti). These towers are unique to the region and were primarily built between the 9th and 12th centuries, during the Georgian Golden Age. However, the origins of the tower likely date back to prehistory. There are around 3500 Svan towers in Svaneti.

== Description ==
The Svan towers are either freestanding or attached to residential houses. The towers usually have 3–5 storeys, and the thickness of the walls decreases with height, giving them a tapering appearance. The upper floors of the towers are exclusively used for defense, with machicolated parapets and embrasures providing cover when throwing projectiles. The connected houses are usually 80–130 square meters in ground area and have 2 floors: the ground floor of the house, called the machub, and the upper floor, called the darbazi. The ground floor is a single hall with a hearth and provides accommodation for both people and animals, with elaborately decorated wooden partitions separating the two spaces. The second floor provides summer accommodation and storage. The second floor also provides access to the tower (if a tower is attached). The floors are connected by a wooden ladder.

== Conservation ==
Many of the towers in the Svaneti region have fallen into disrepair or have disappeared entirely, however, Chazhashi in the Ushguli community has been preserved as a museum reserve, containing over 200 of these towers. The unique architecture of the Svaneti towers and the medieval character of Ushguli, Mestia, and the Upper Svaneti led to the region's inscription on the UNESCO World Heritage List in 1996.

A modern reconstruction of a Svan Tower is built near Tbilisi, as part of the Tbilisi Open Air Museum of Ethnography in Georgia, overlooking the Turtle Lake, behind Vake Park.

== See also ==
- Chazhashi
- Mestia
- Ushguli
- Vainakh tower architecture
