= Ailama =

Mountain peak in Russia

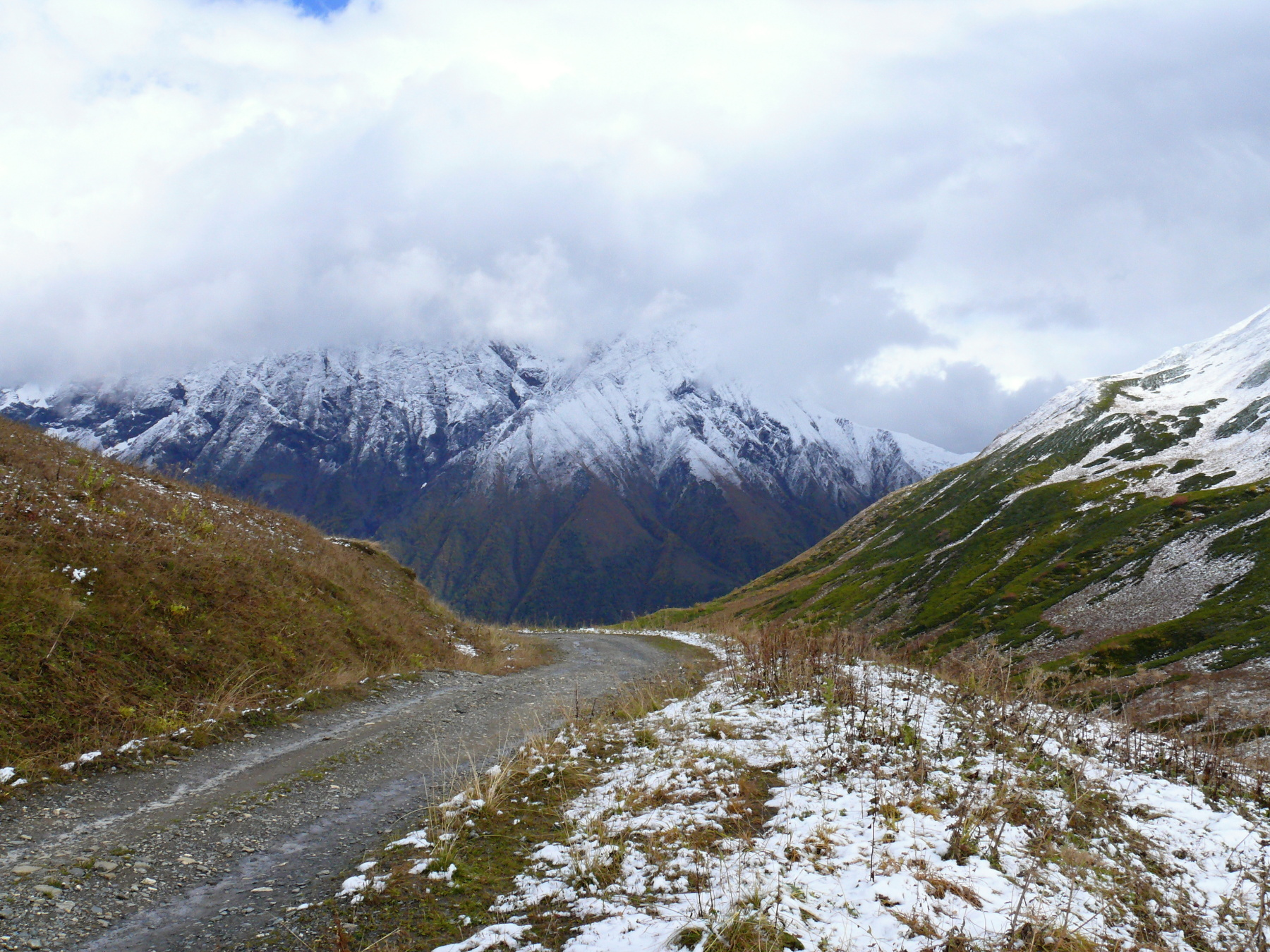

Highest point
- Elevation: 4,547 m (14,918 ft)
- Prominence: 696 m (2,283 ft)
- Isolation: 5.88 km (3.65 mi)
- Coordinates: 42.9572°N 43.1796°E

Geography
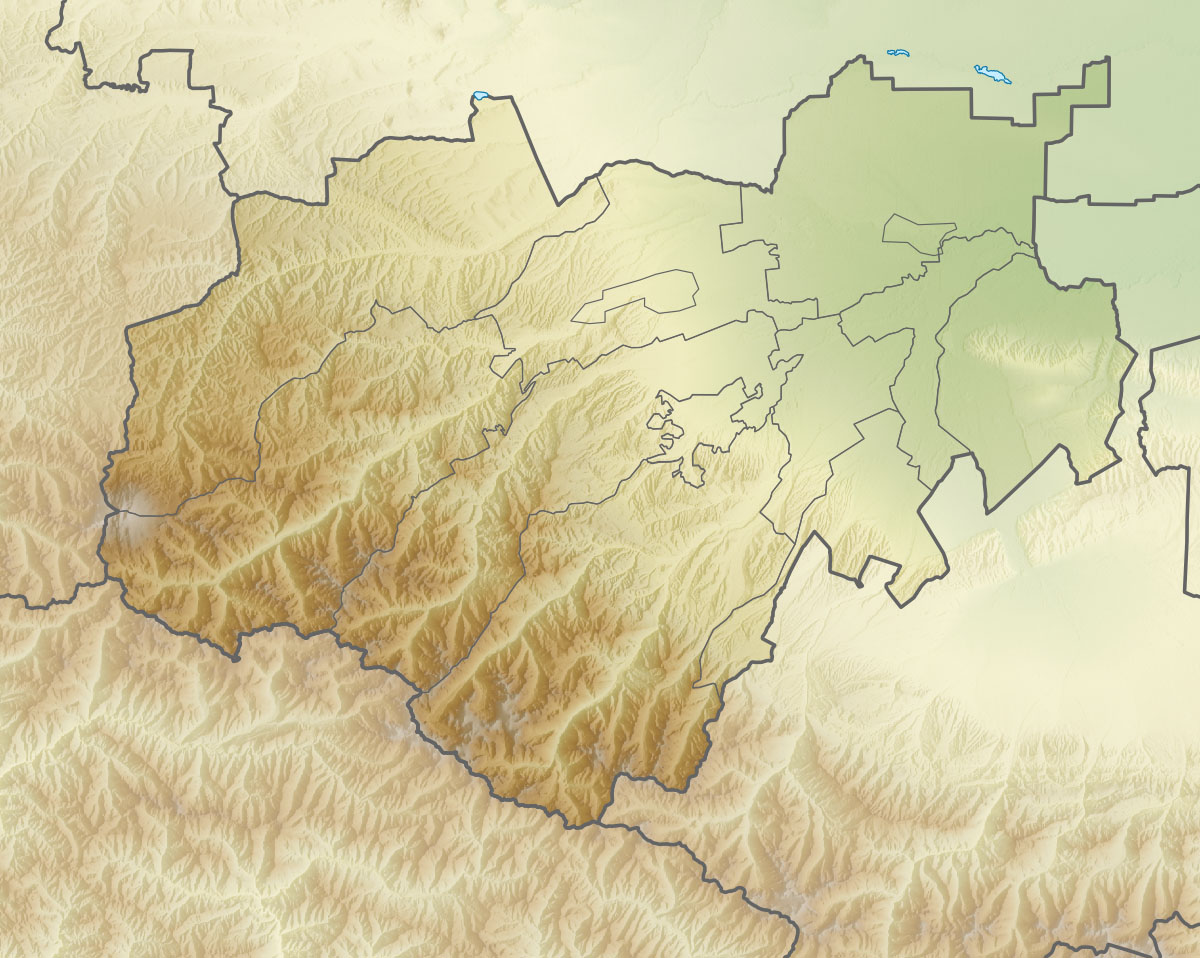
- Location within Georgia Location within Kabardino-Balkaria
- Location: Racha-Lechkhumi and Kvemo Svaneti, Georgia; Kabardino-Balkaria, Russia
- Countries: Georgia and Kabardino-Balkaria
- Parent range: Caucasus Mountains

Climbing
- First ascent: 1889
- Easiest route: basic snow/ice climb

Ailama or Ahlama (Georgian: აილამა, აჰლამა) is a peak in the central part of the Svaneti section of the Greater Caucasus Mountain Range, located on the border between Racha-Lechkhumi and Kvemo Svaneti region of Georgia, and Kabardino-Balkaria, Russia at the source of the river Koruldashi. The lower slopes are covered with alpine and sub alpine meadows, while the upper slopes have glacial landscapes. There is a mountaineering camp named "Ailama" at the base of the mountain's southern slope.

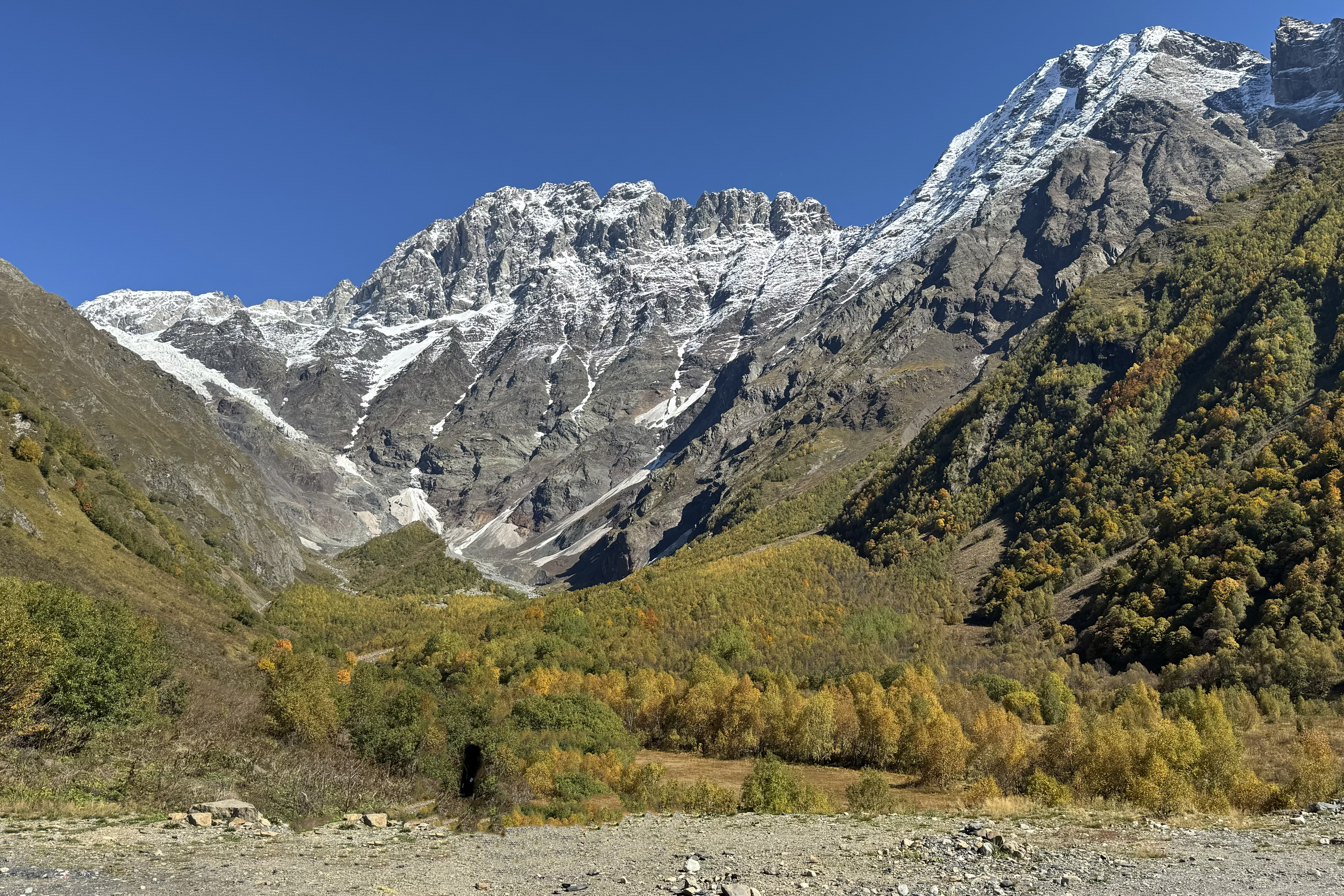
