= Mestia Municipality =

Coordinates: 43°N 42.75°E

Mestia Municipality მესტიის მუნიციპალიტეტი
- Municipality
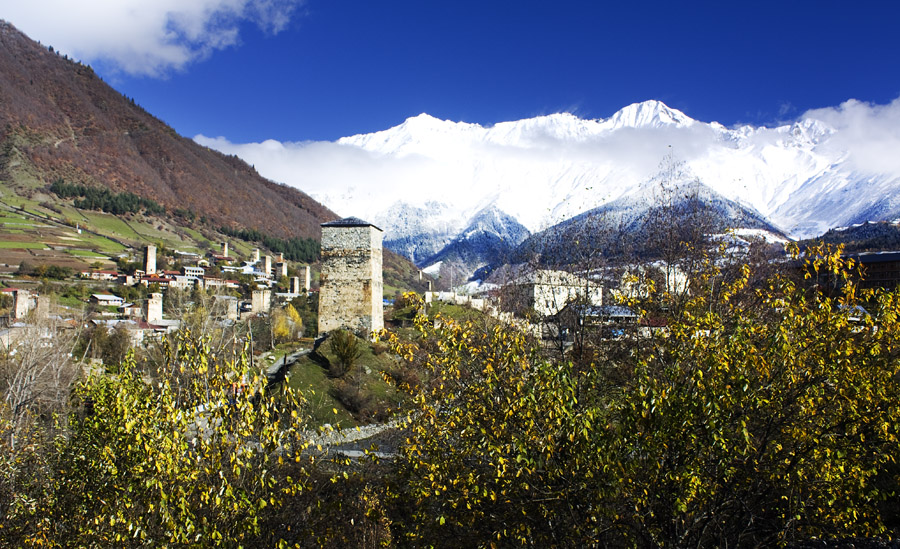
- Town Mestia

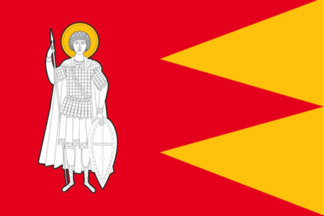
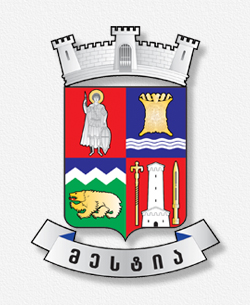
- Flag Seal

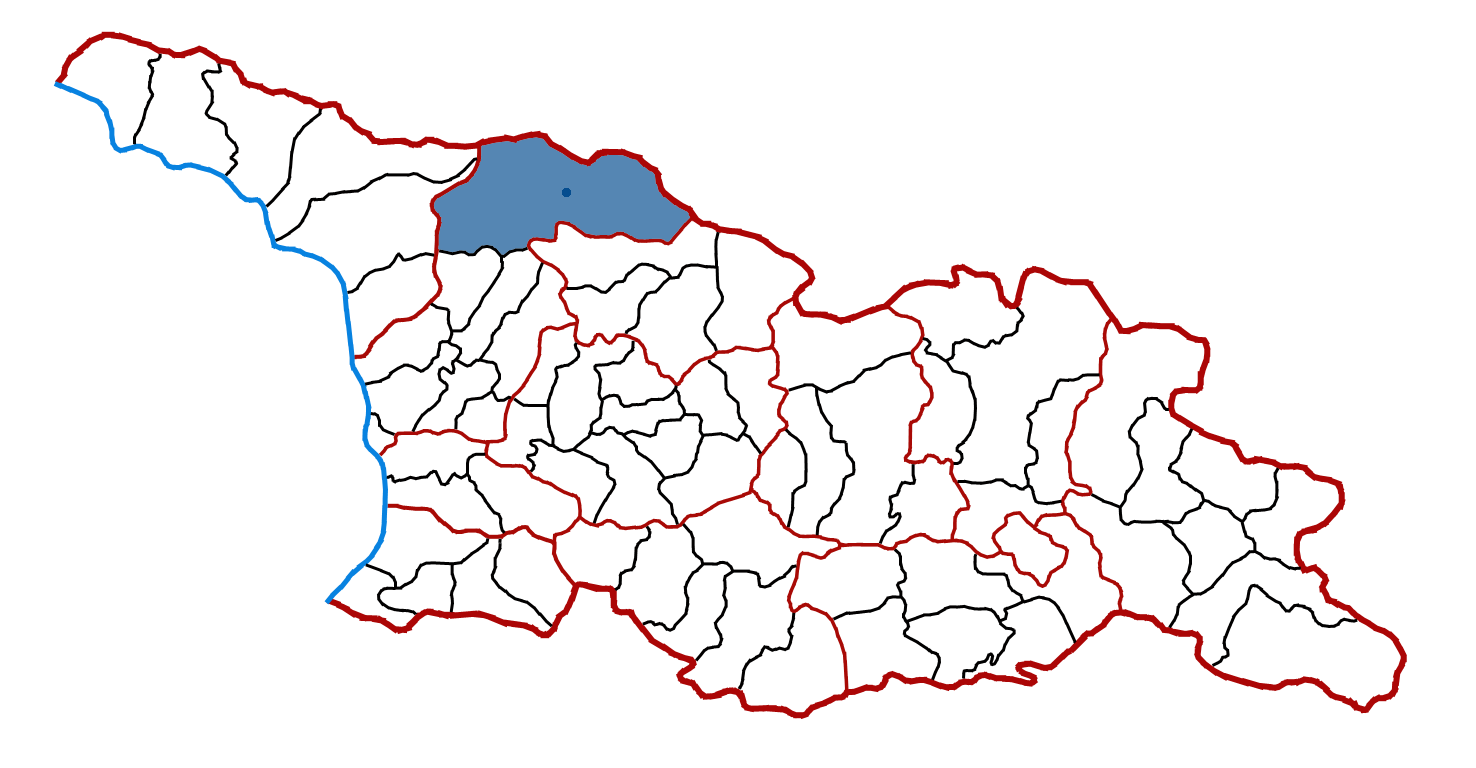
- Location of the municipality within Georgia
- Country: Georgia
- Region: Samegrelo-Zemo Svaneti
- Administrative centre: Mestia

Government
  - Body: Mestia Municipal Assembly
  - Mayor: Kapiton Zhorzholiani

Area
  - Total: 3,044 km^{2} (1,175 sq mi)

Population (2014)
  - Total: 9,316
  - Density: 3.06/km^{2} (7.9/sq mi)

Population by ethnicity
  - Georgians: 99.82 %
  - Russians: 0.12 %
  - Ukrainians: 0.03 %
- Time zone: UTC+4 (Georgian Standard Time)
- Website: https://mestia.gov.ge/

Mestia (Georgian: მესტიის მუნიციპალიტეტი, Mesṫiis municiṗaliṫeṫi) is a district of Georgia, in the region of Samegrelo-Zemo Svaneti. Its main town is Mestia.

It has an area of 3,045 km^{2} and had a population of 9,316 at the 2014 census.

== Politics ==
Mestia Municipal Assembly (Georgian: მესტიის საკრებულო, Mestia Sakrebulo) is a representative body in Mestia Municipality, consisting of 31 members which is elected every four years. The last election was held in October 2021. Kapiton Zhorzholiani of Georgian Dream was re-elected mayor.

Party	2017	2021	Current Municipal Assembly
Georgian Dream	23	26	
United National Movement	1	3	
For Georgia		2	
Lelo		1	
European Georgia	2	1	
Alliance of Patriots	3		
Independent	2		
Total	31	33	

== Settlements ==
Rank	Settlement	Population
1	Mestia	1,973
2	Ushguli	228
3	Adishi	44
4	Chazhashi	28

== See also ==
- List of municipalities in Georgia (country)
