= Vainakh tower architecture =

Vainakh tower architecture may refer to:

- Chechen tower architecture
- Ingush towers
