= Svaneti =

Historic province of Georgia

Svaneti სვანეთი
- Historical Region
- The historic region of Svaneti in Georgia
- Coordinates: 42°54′59″N 43°00′41″E
- Country: Georgia
- Mkhare: Racha-Lechkhumi and Kvemo Svaneti; Samegrelo-Zemo Svaneti; Abkhazia
- Capital: Mestia, Lentekhi

Area
  - Total: 5,776.4 km^{2} (2,230.3 sq mi)

Population
  - Total: 23,000
  - Density: 4.0/km^{2} (10/sq mi)

Upper Svaneti
UNESCO World Heritage Site
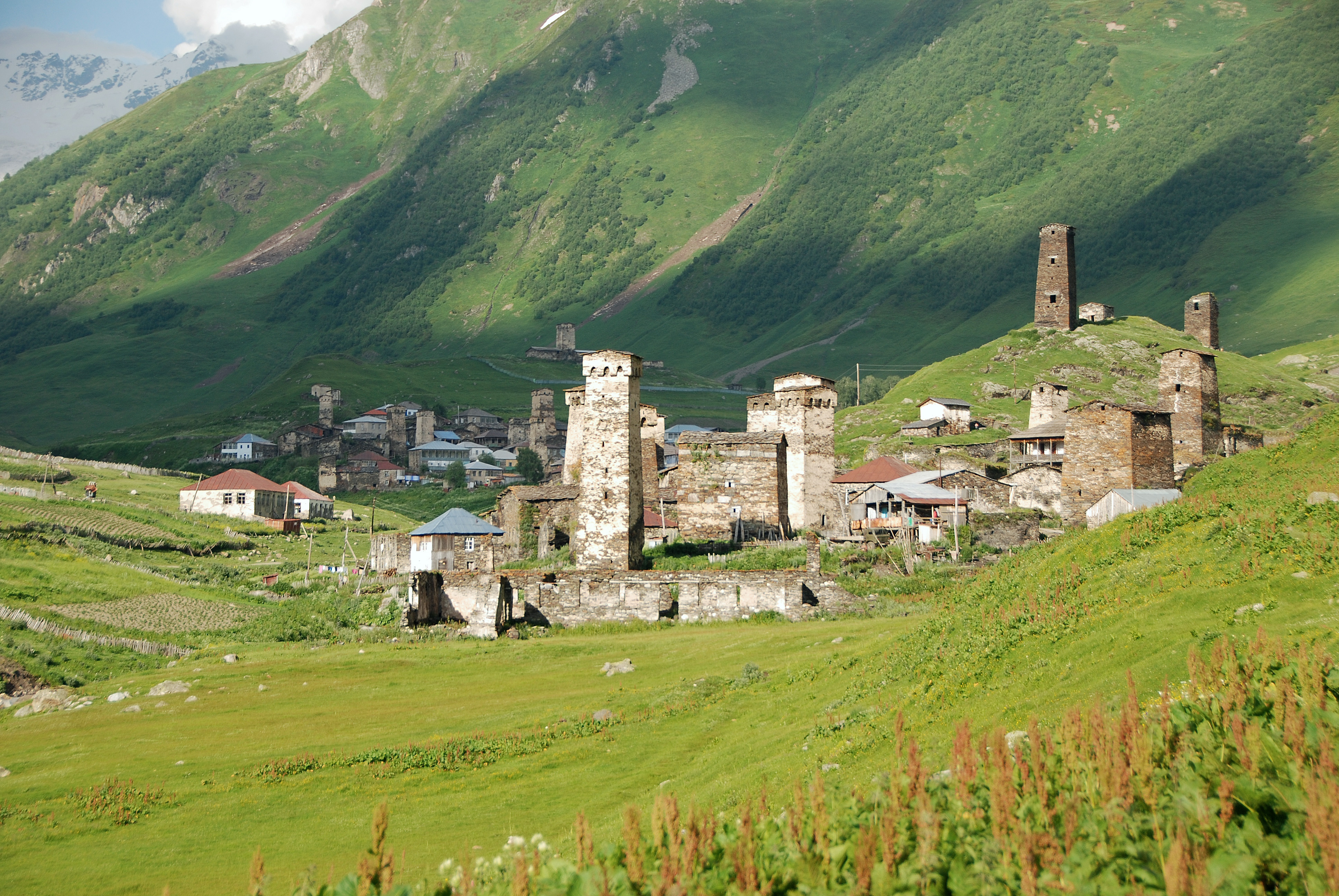
- Ushguli in 2010

- Location within Georgia Location within West and Central Asia
- Location: Chazhashi
- Criteria: Cultural: iv, v
- Reference: 709
- Inscription: 1996 (20th Session)
- Area: 1.06 ha (2.6 acres)
- Buffer zone: 19.16 ha (47.3 acres)
- Coordinates: 42°54′27″N 43°0′39″E

Svaneti (Svan: შუ̂ან, ლემშუ̂ანიერა; shwan, lemshwaniera, and Suania in ancient sources; Georgian: სვანეთი [ˈs̪ʷän̪e̞t̪ʰi] Svaneti) is a province in the northwestern part of Georgia. Running along the Greater Caucasus range, Svaneti is one of the most mountainous regions of Georgia. It is largely inhabited by the Svans, an ethnic subgroup of Georgians.

== Geography ==
The two valleys of Svaneti

= Upper Svaneti = Lower Svaneti

= Kodori valley which also has a Svan population

Situated on the southern slopes of the central Caucasus Mountains and surrounded by 3,000–5,000 meter peaks, Svaneti is the highest inhabited area in the Caucasus. Four of the 10 highest peaks of the Caucasus are located in the region. The highest mountain in Georgia, Mount Shkhara at 5,201 meters (17,064 feet), is located in the province. Prominent peaks include Tetnuldi (4,974 metres; 16,319 feet), Shota Rustaveli (4,960 metres; 16,270 feet), Mount Ushba (4,710 metres; 15,450 feet), Ailama (4,525 metres; 14,846 feet), as well as Lalveri, Latsga and others.

Svaneti has two parts corresponding to two inhabited valleys:

- Upper Svaneti (Zemo Svaneti) on the upper Inguri River; administratively part of Samegrelo-Zemo Svaneti; main town Mestia
- Lower Svaneti (Kvemo Svaneti) on the upper Tskhenistsqali River; administratively part of Racha-Lechkhumi and Kvemo Svaneti; main town Lentekhi

They are separated by the Svaneti Range which is almost as high as the main Caucasus range. Historical Svaneti also included the Kodori Gorge in the adjoining rebel province of Abkhazia, and part of the adjacent river valleys of Kuban and Baksan north of the crest of the Caucasus. Writing in 1848, Bodenstedt said that Upper Svaneti could only be reached by a difficult footpath that was closed in winter.

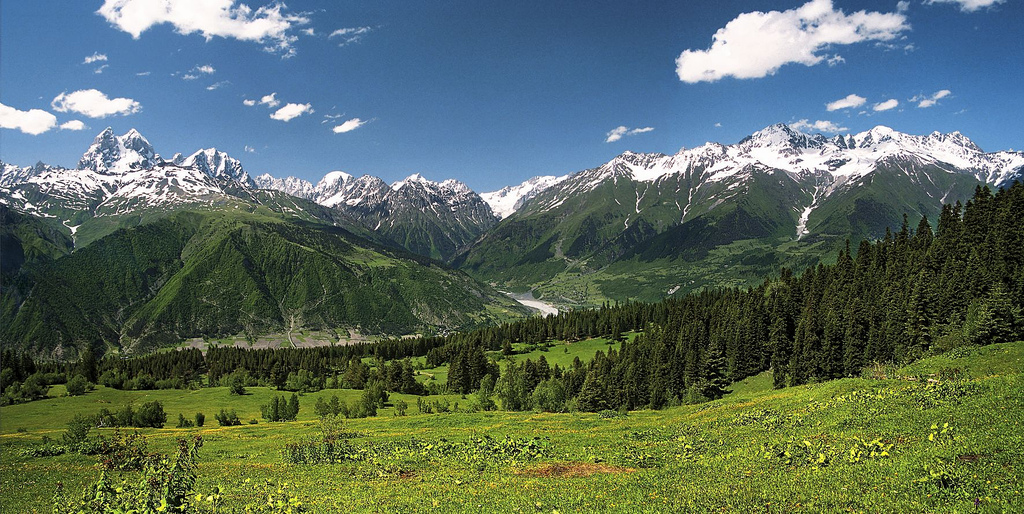

=== Landscape ===
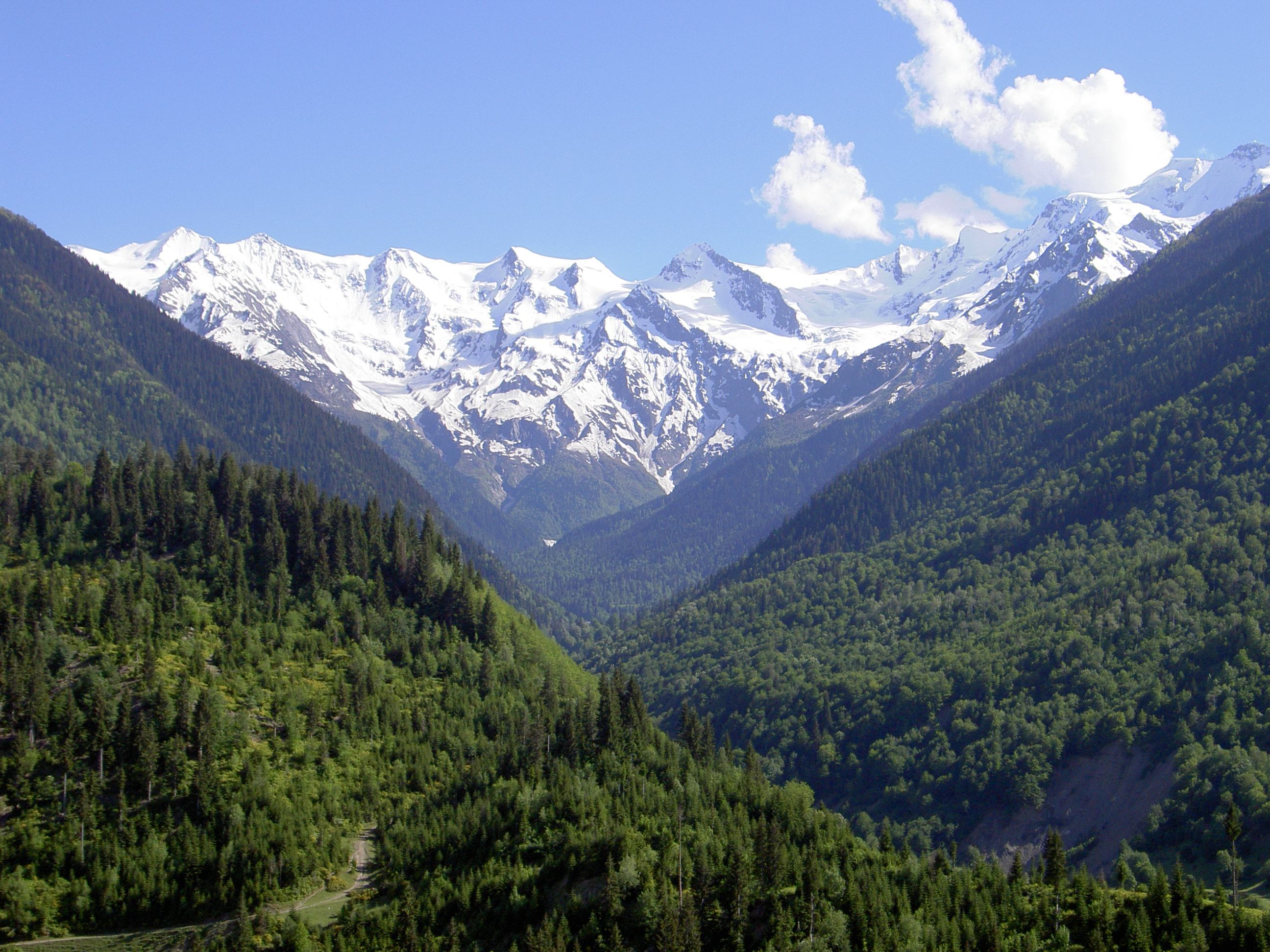
View of the Caucasus Mountains in Svaneti.

The landscape of Svaneti is dominated by mountains that are separated by deep gorges. Most of the region which lies below 1,800 meters (5,900 feet) above sea level is covered by mixed and coniferous forests. The forest zone is made up of tree species such as spruce, fir, beech, oak, and hornbeam. Other species that are less common but may still be found in some areas include chestnut, birch, maple, pine and box. The zone which extends from 1,800 meters to roughly about 3,000 meters (5,904–9,840 ft) above sea level consists of alpine meadows and grasslands. Eternal snows and glaciers take over in areas that are over 3,000 meters above sea level. The region is notable for its glaciers and picturesque summits. Svaneti's signature peak is probably Mount Ushba which towers over the Inguri Gorge and can be seen from many parts of the region.

=== Climate ===
The climate of Svaneti is humid and is influenced by the air masses coming in from the Black Sea throughout the year. Average temperatures and precipitation vary considerably with elevation. Annual precipitation ranges between 1,000 and 3,200 mm (39 and 126 in). The highest amount of precipitation falls on the Greater Caucasus Mountains. The region is characterized by very heavy snowfall in the winter and avalanches are a frequent occurrence. Snow cover may reach 5 meters (16 feet) in some areas. In general, the lowest regions of Svaneti (800–1,200 meters (2,600–3,900 ft) above sea level) are characterized by long, warm summers and relatively cold and snowy winters. Middle altitudes (1200–1800 meters above sea level) experience relatively warm summers and cold winters. Areas above 2000 meters above sea level lie within a zone that experiences short, cool summers (less than 3 months) and long and cold winters. Large parts of Svaneti lie above 3,000 meters (9,800 feet) above sea level, a zone that does not have a real summer. Due to Svaneti's close proximity to the Black Sea, the region is spared from the extremely cold winter temperatures that are characteristic of high mountains.

== History ==
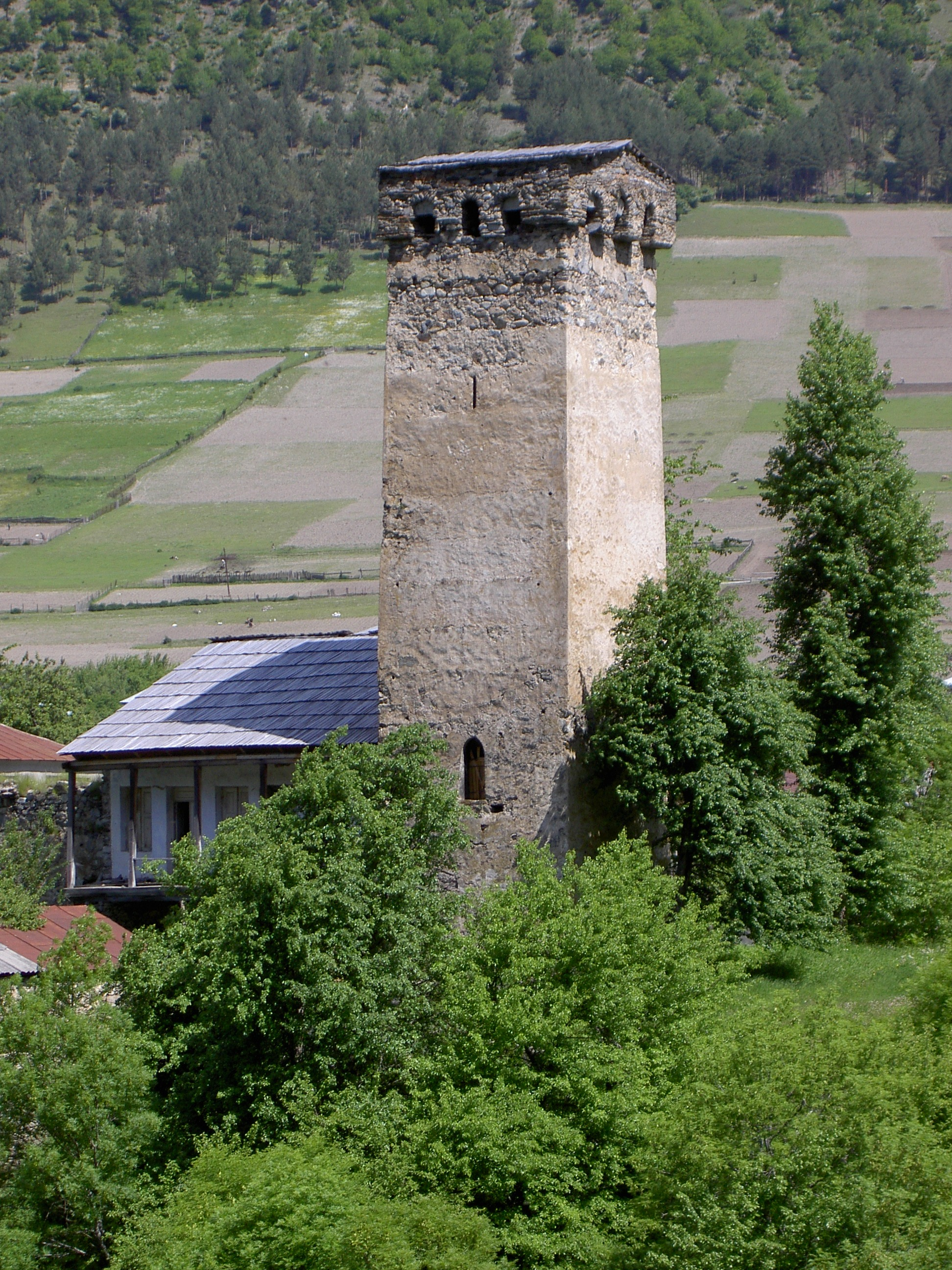
A typical Svanetian tower

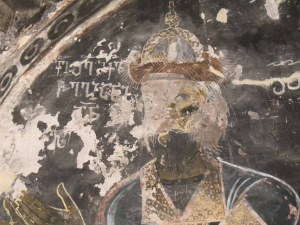
An 11th-century fresco of the Svan nobleman Mikael Chagiani from Adishi.

The Svans are usually identified with the Soanes mentioned by the Greek geographer Strabo, who placed them more or less in the area occupied by the modern-day Svans. The province had been a dependency of Colchis, and of its successor kingdom of Lazica (Egrisi) until AD 552, when the Svans took advantage of the Lazic War, repudiated this connection and went over to the Persians. The Oxford Dictionary of Late Antiquity notes that "this seems to have reflected a general Suanian preference for the alliance to Persia, set against a Lazican preference for Roman alliance, which was to remain a point of tension until the Arab conquests". The Byzantines wanted the region, for if they secured its passes, they could prevent Persian raids on the border areas of Lazica. With the end of the war (562), Svanetia again became part of Lazica. Then, the province joined the Kingdom of Abkhazia (John and Adarnase of the Shavliani dynasty, 871–893) to form a unified monarchy which was incorporated into the Kingdom of Georgia in the early 11th century. Svanetia became a duchy (saeristavo) within it, governed by a duke (eristavi). The province's Orthodox culture flourished particularly during the Georgian “golden age” under Queen Tamar (r. 1184–1213), who was respected almost as a goddess by the Svanetians. The legend has it that the duchy was annually visited by Tamar. The Svans had been known as fierce warriors for centuries. Their inflatable war banner was named Lemi (Lion) because of its shape.

The marauding Mongols never reached Svanetia and, for a time, the region became a cultural safe house. Following the final disintegration of the Kingdom of Georgia in the 1460s, fighting broke out for controlling the province. Part of Upper Svanetia formed an independent Principality of Svaneti under the Princes Dadeshkeliani, a branch of the House of Gelovani, while Lower Svanetia, originally ruled by the Princes Gelovani, was temporarily usurped and subdued by the Mingrelian princes Dadiani. Facing serious internal conflict, Prince Tsioq’ Dadeshkeliani of Svanetia signed a treaty of protectorate with the Russian Empire on November 26, 1833. Difficult to access, the region retained significant autonomy until 1857, when Russia took advantage of the dynastic feud in Svanetia and effectively abolished the principality's autonomy. In 1875, the Russians toughened their rule by imposing additional taxes. Protests ensued, and Russia deployed troops against the province. Despite having suffered heavy losses, the Russian army units eventually crushed the rebels burning their stronghold Khalde to the ground in 1876.

Part of the Russian governorate of Kutais, Svanetia was divided into two raions (districts) — Mestia (former Sethi) and Lentekhi — under the Soviet rule. The unsuccessful anti-Soviet Svaneti uprising took place in the region in 1921.

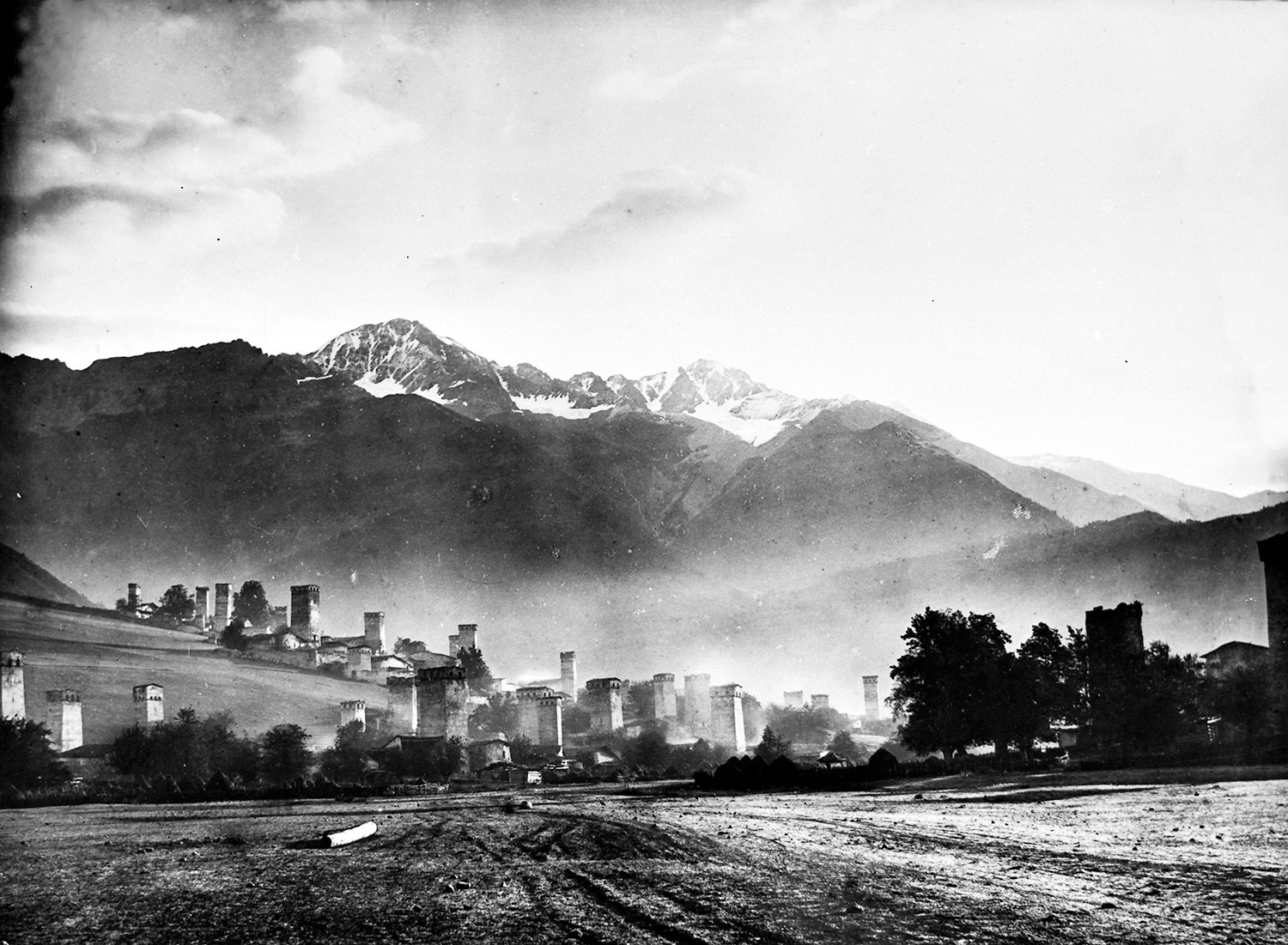
Mestia, c. 1890s

In 1987, avalanches destroyed several homes and killed at least 80, many of them schoolchildren. In the aftermath the Central Committee of the Communist Party of the Soviet Union and the Council of Ministers of the Soviet Union passed a decree to resettle some 2,500 families to districts of eastern Georgia (eco-migration to Marneuli, Tetritskaro, Bolnisi, Sagarejo, Gardabani, Dmanisi, Kaspi, Tskaltubo, Khoni, Ozurgeti, and Lanchkhuti rayons). The end of the Soviet Union and subsequent Georgian Civil War created severe socioeconomic problems in the region. While the Svanetian population resisted the unpleasant conditions of the high mountain environment they lived in for centuries, the increasing economic difficulties of the last two decades and frequent natural disasters — floods and landslides as of April 2005 have brought about a strong tendency towards migration. The province became a safe haven for criminals threatening local residents and tourists. Large-scale anti-criminal operations carried out by the Georgian Special Forces as of March 2004. resulted in significant improvement of the situation.

== Population ==
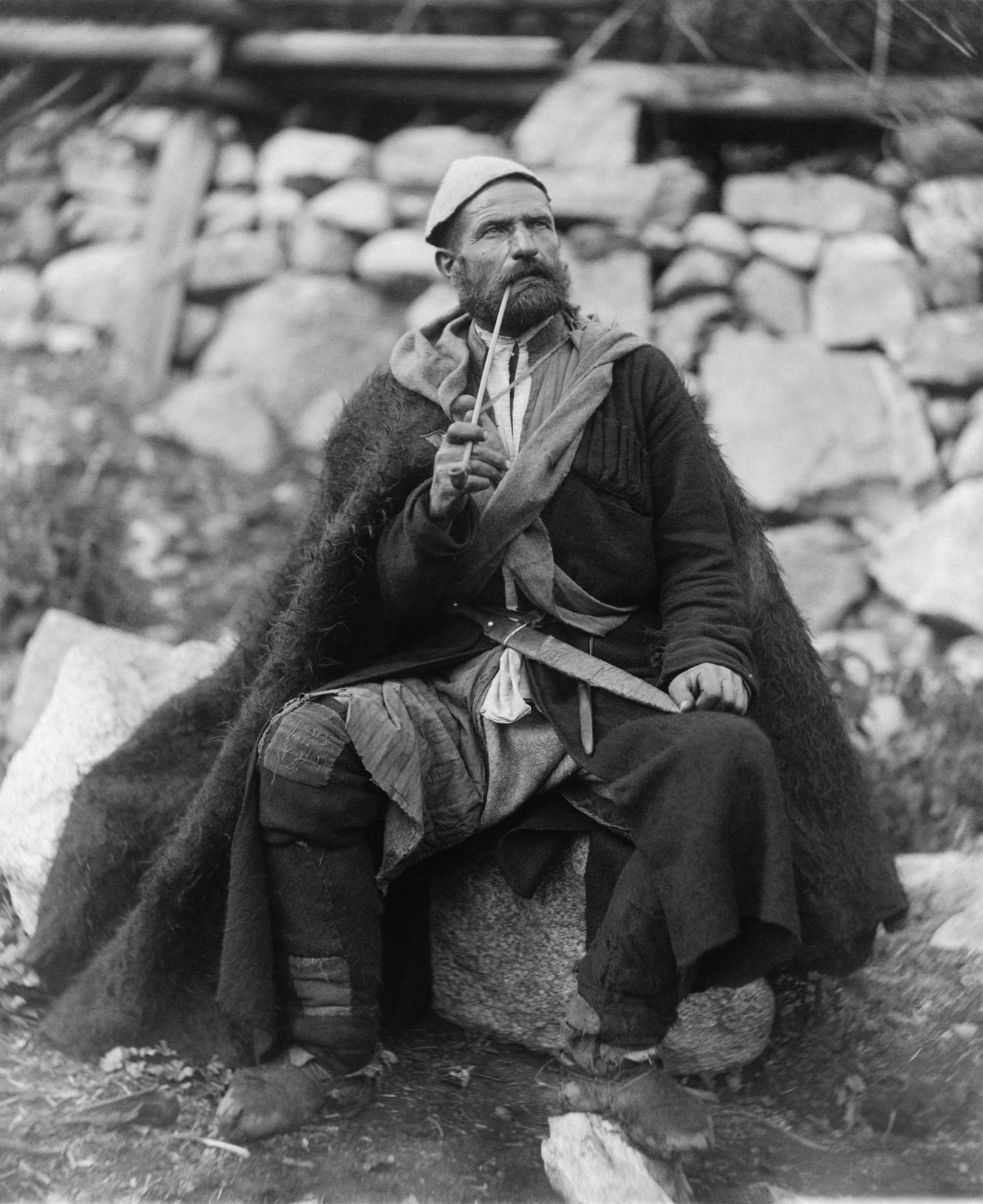
Svan with khanjali (dagger) and long smoking pipe. Mestia (~1888–1900)

The Svans, the indigenous population of Svaneti, are an ethnic subgroup of the Georgians. In the Russian Empire and early Soviet Union Mingrelians and Svans had their own census grouping, but were classified under the broader category of Georgian in the 1930s. They are Georgian Orthodox Christians, and were Christianized in the 4th–6th centuries. However, some remnants of pre-Christian beliefs have been maintained. Saint George (known as Jgëræg to the locals), a patron saint of Georgia, is the most respected saint. The Svans have retained many of their old traditions, including blood revenge, although this tradition has been declining over time and as law enforcement takes hold. Their families are small, and the husband is the head of his family. The Svan strongly respect the older women in families.

Typically bilingual, they use both Georgian and their own, unwritten Svan language, which together with the Georgian, Mingrelian, and Laz languages constitute the South Caucasian or Kartvelian language family.

== Culture and tourism ==
Svanetia is known for its architectural treasures and picturesque landscapes. The Svanetian tower houses, erected mainly in the 9th-12th centuries, make the region's villages more attractive. With a high quantity of these unique houses and exceptional preservation of a medieval rural village, the community of Ushguli in Upper Svaneti was listed as a UNESCO World Heritage Site in 1996.

Svan songs and dances are notable cultural traditions. Svanetia boasts arguably the most archaic three-part polyphonic singing. Most of their songs are connected to round dances, are performed very loudly and are full of dissonant chords.

== See also ==
- Samegrelo-Zemo Svaneti
- Racha-Lechkhumi and Kvemo Svaneti
- Kodori Valley
- Dadeshkeliani
- Ushguli
- Gelovani
