= Ushguli =

Community of villages in Svaneti, Georgia

Ushguli უშგული
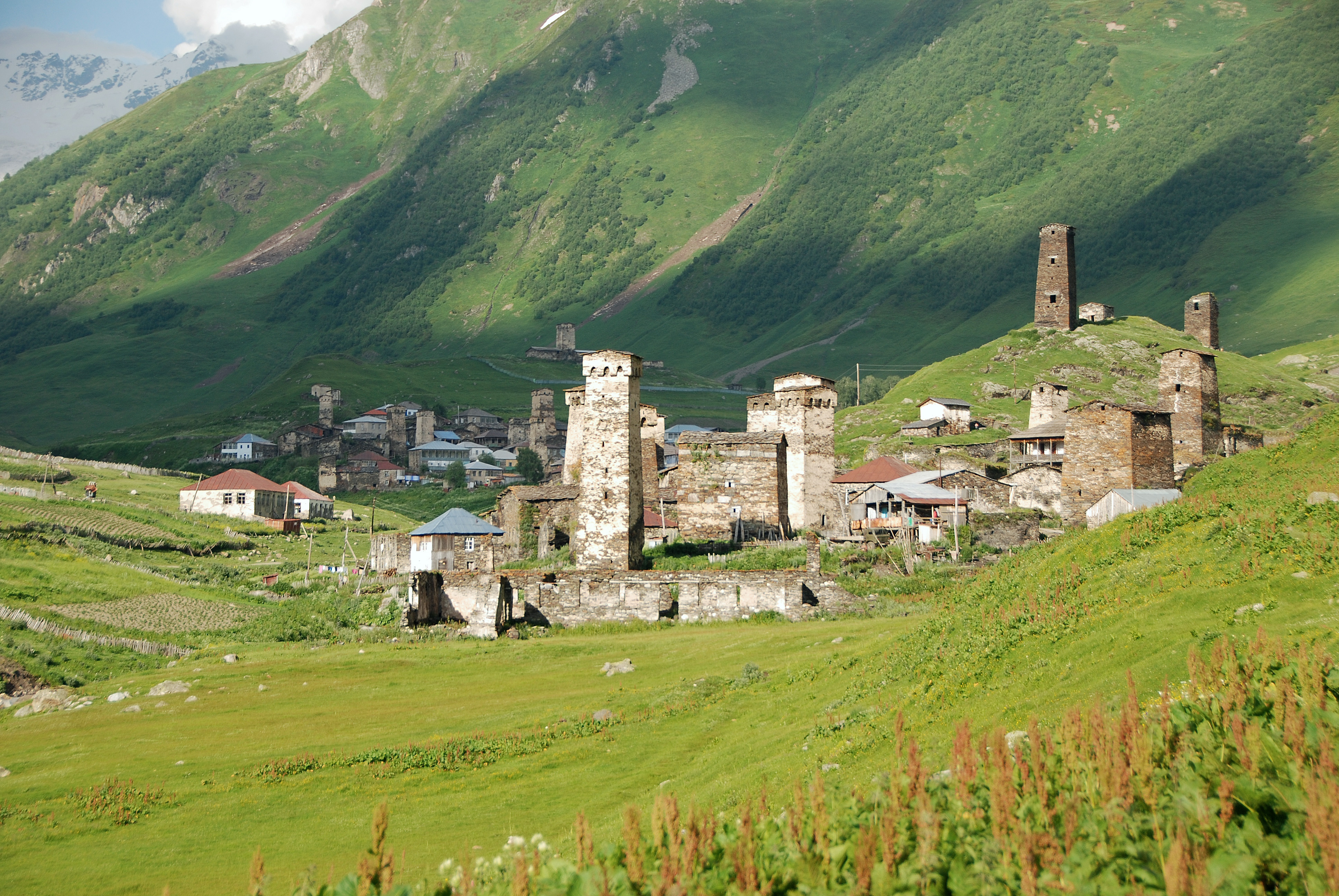
- Ushguli

- Location within Georgia Location within Samegrelo-Zemo Svaneti
- Coordinates: 42.917797°N 43.015672°E
- Country: Georgia
- Mkhare: Samegrelo-Zemo Svaneti
- District: Mestia

Population (2014)
  - Total: 228
- Time zone: UTC+4 (Georgian Time)

UNESCO World Heritage Site
- Official name: Upper Svaneti
- Criteria: Cultural: (iv)(v)
- Reference: 709
- Inscription: 1996 (20th Session)
- Area: 1.06 ha (2.6 acres)
- Buffer zone: 19.16 ha (47.3 acres)

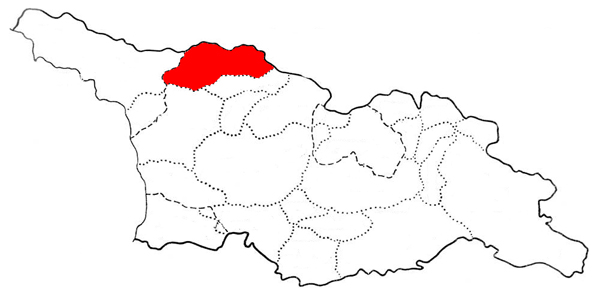
The historic region of Upper Svaneti in Georgia

Ushguli (Georgian: უშგული [ˈuʒguli]) is a community of five medieval villages located at the head of the Enguri gorge in Svaneti, Georgia. Ushguli is one of the highest continuously inhabited settlements in Europe. Compared to somewhat more developed towns like Mestia, Ushguli is not in an accessible location, which has preserved many of the villages' medieval characteristics, including unique defensive tower houses called Svan towers. Because of their preservation and traditional architecture, Ushguli, Mestia, and the surrounding area was recognized as the Upper Svaneti UNESCO World Heritage Site in 1996.

== Location and features ==
Ushguli is located at an altitude of 2,100 metres (6,900 ft) near the foot of Shkhara, one of the highest summits of the Greater Caucasus mountains. About 70 families (about 200 people) live in the area, enough to support a small school. The area is snow-covered for 6 months of the year, and often the road to Mestia is impassable.

The Lamaria church (named for the goddess Lamaria in Svaneti mythology) in Zhibiani is located on a hilltop dominating the village. The chapel dates back to the 12th century and contains Georgian Golden Age-era frescoes.

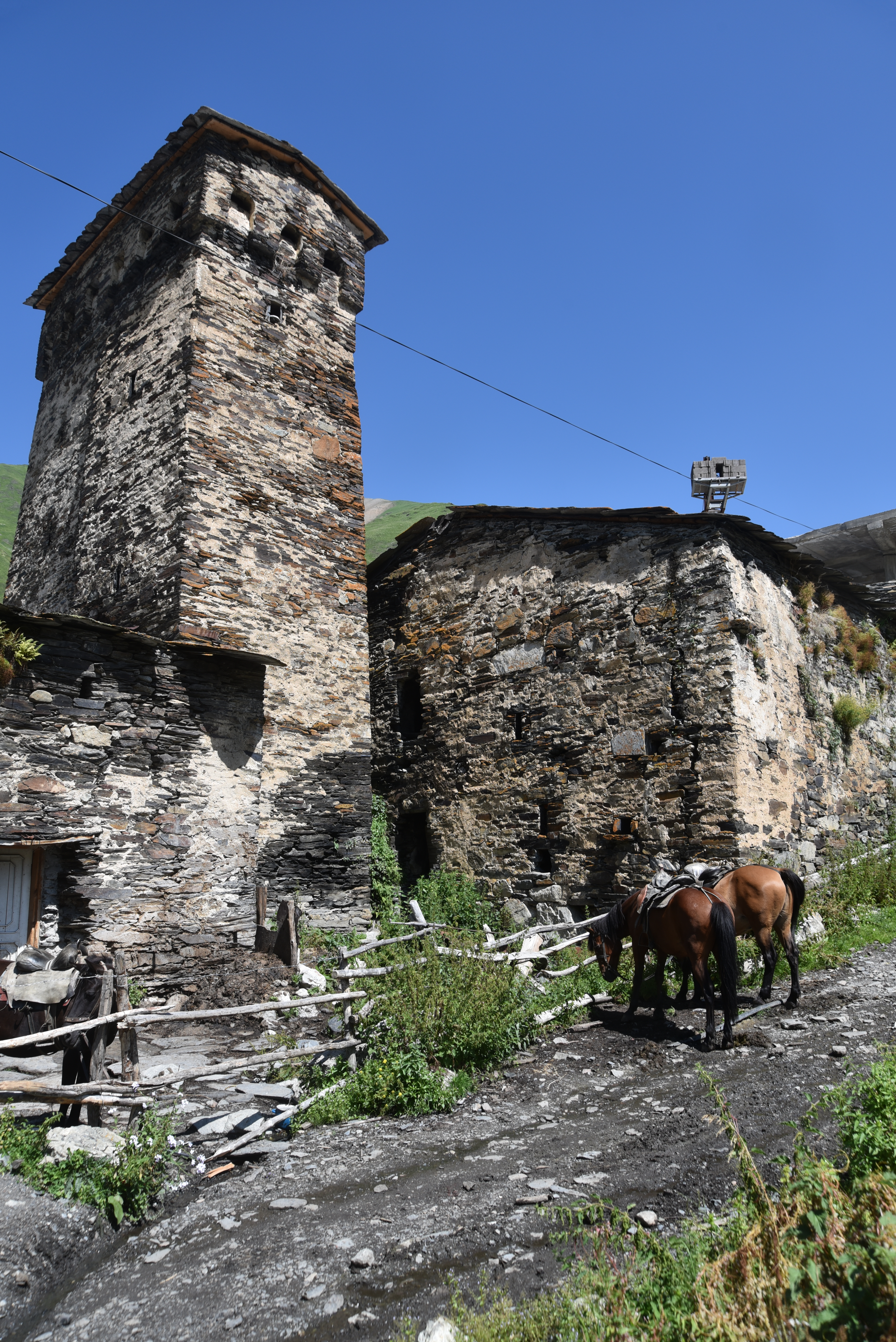
Medieval towers in Ushguli

The most notable feature of the villages in Ushguli are the defensive tower houses found throughout the community. These houses, between 3-5 stories tall, were built primarily between the 9th and 12th centuries. Although many of the towers in the lower towns such as Mestia have fallen into disrepair, the isolation of Ushguli has preserved the towers. Chazhashi, one of the villages within the community, contains over 200 of these towers and has been preserved as a Museum-Reserve.

The Mikhail Kalatozov silent film documentary Salt for Svanetia was filmed in Ushguli.

== Constituent villages of Ushguli ==
Ushguli consists of the following villages:

- Zhibiani (Georgian: ჟიბიანი)
- Chvibiani or Chubiani (Georgian: ჩვიბიანი
- Chazhashi or Chajashi (Georgian: ჩაჟაში)
- Murqmeli (Georgian: მურყმელი)
- Lamjurishi (Georgian: ლამჯურიში)

== See also ==
- Mestia
- Bochorna
- Samegrelo-Zemo Svaneti
