= Mestia =

Town in northwest Georgia

Mestia მესტია
- Townlet
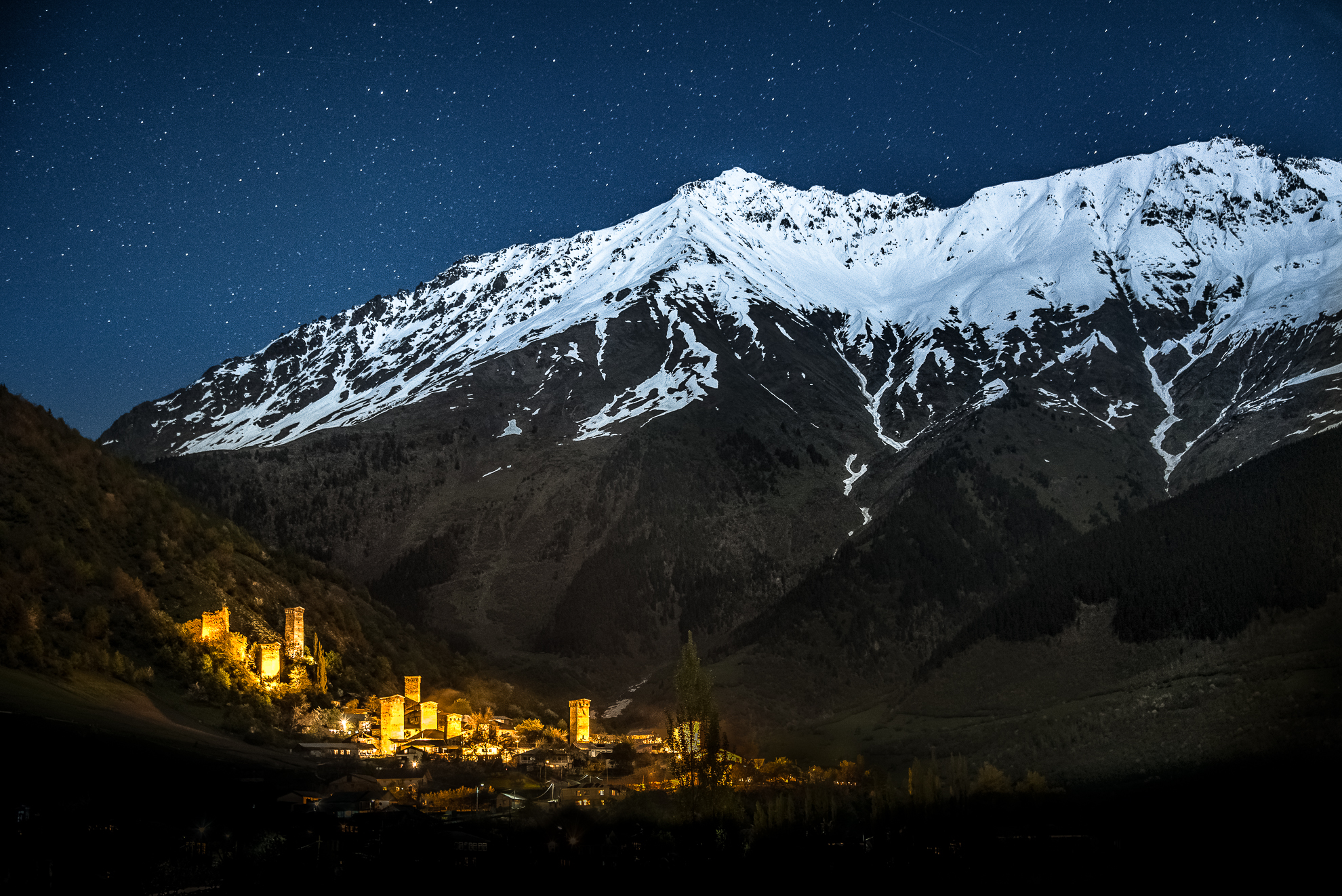
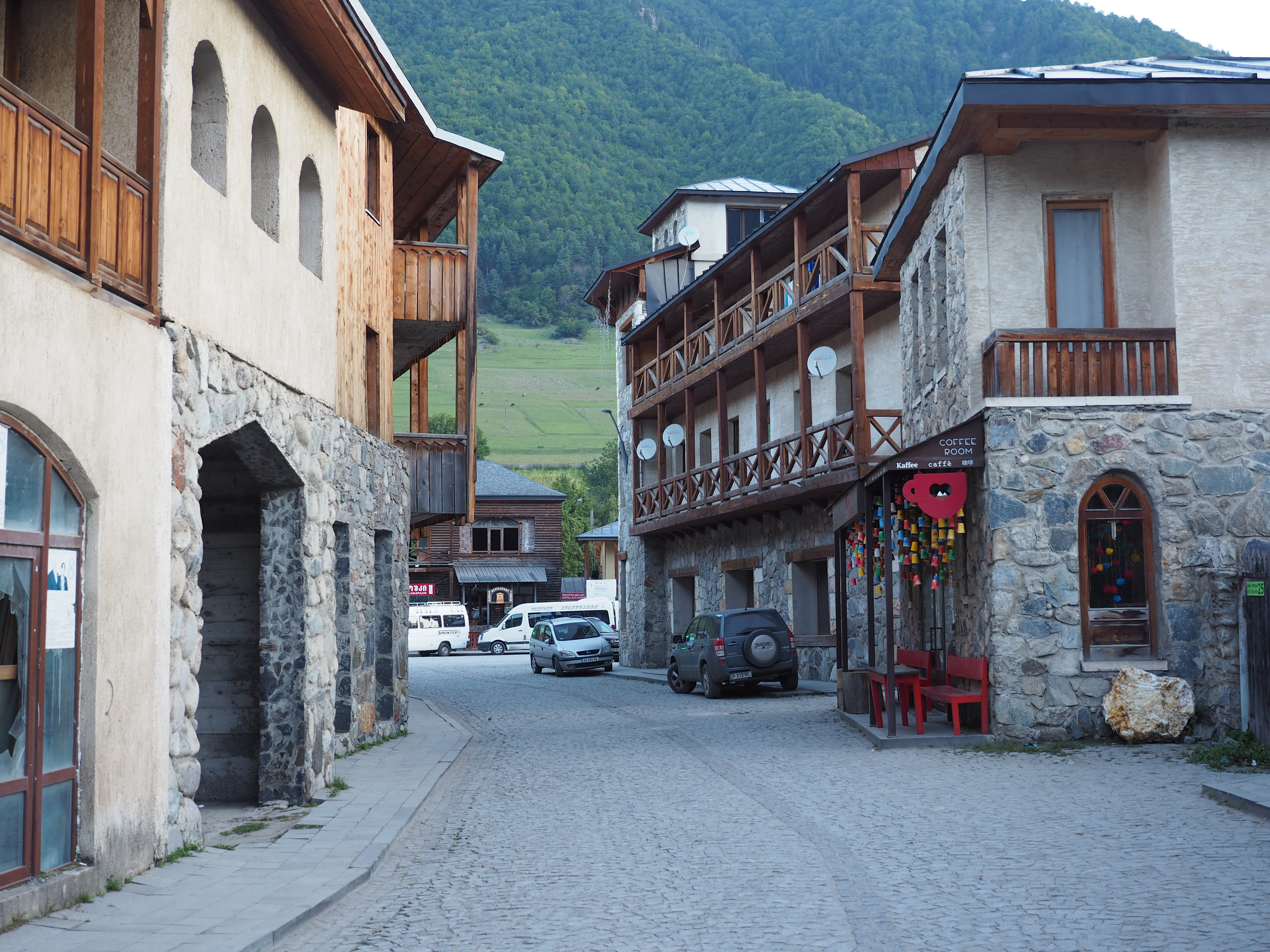
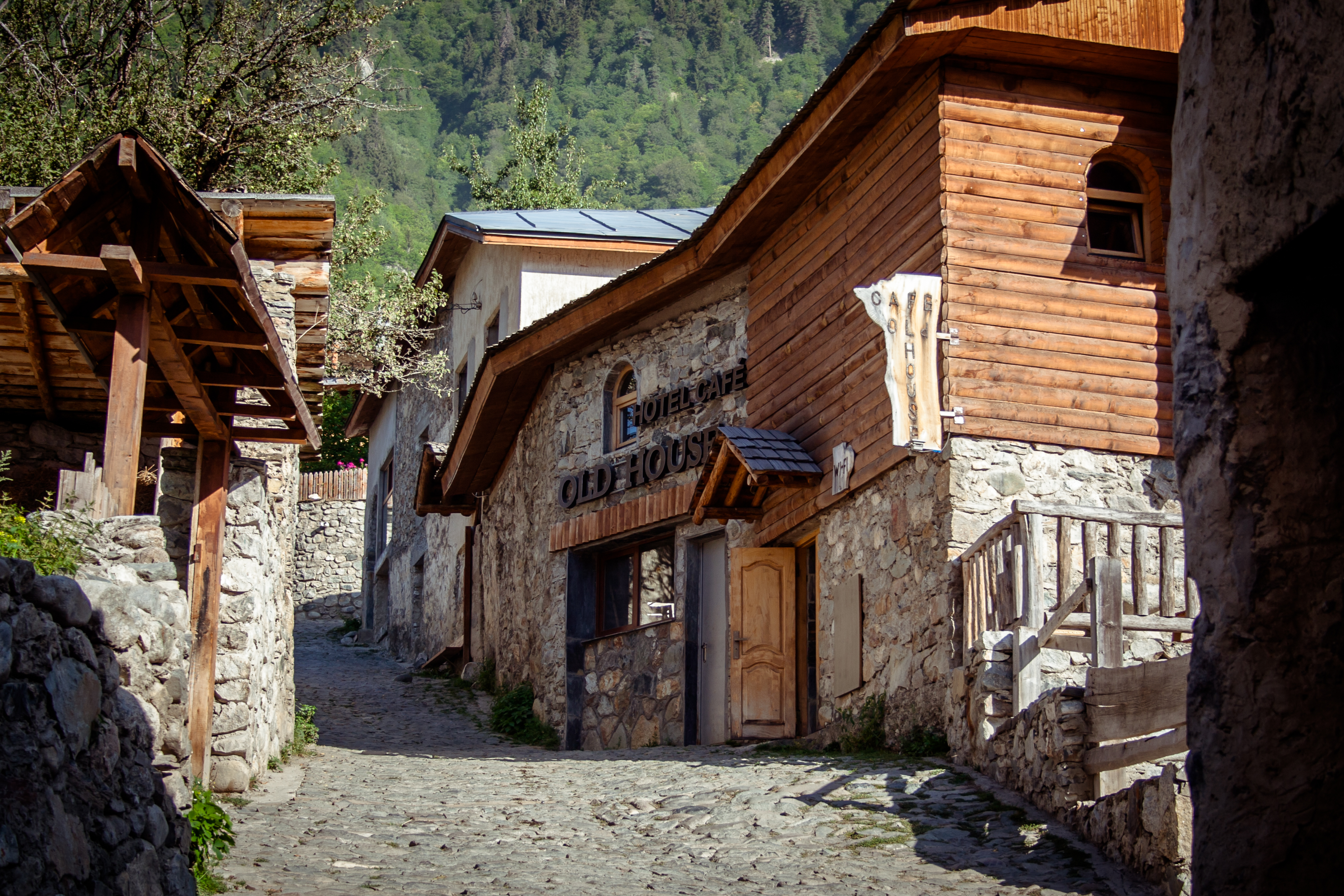
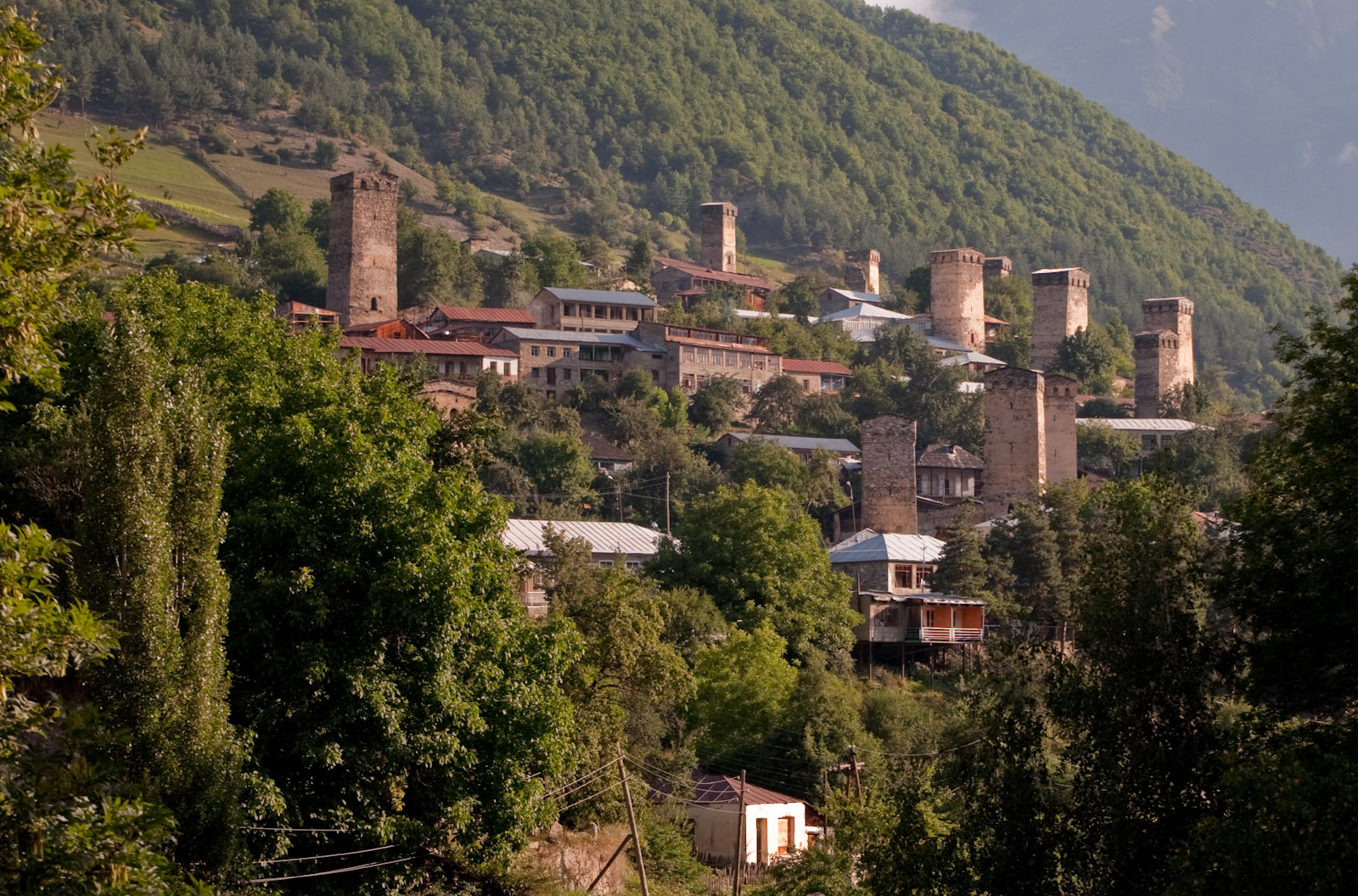

- Location of Mestia in Georgia Mestia (Samegrelo-Zemo Svaneti)
- Coordinates: 43°02′44″N 42°43′47″E
- Country: Georgia
- Mkhare: Samegrelo-Zemo Svaneti
- District: Mestia
- Elevation: 1,500 m (4,900 ft)

Population (2014)
  - Total: 1,973
- Time zone: UTC+4 (Georgian Time)
- Climate: Dfb

Mestia (Georgian: მესტია IPA: [mestʼia]) is a highland townlet (daba) in northwest Georgia, at an elevation of 1,500 metres (4,921 feet) in the Caucasus Mountains.

== General information ==
Mestia is located in the region of Samegrelo-Zemo Svaneti province (mkhare), some 128 kilometres (80 miles) northeast of the regional capital of Zugdidi. Mestia and the adjoining 132 villages form Mestia District (raioni). Its area is 3,044 square kilometres (1,175 sq mi); and its population is 9,316 (1,973 in the town itself), according to the 2014 Georgia census. It was granted the status of a townlet (Georgian: daba) in 1968.

Historically and ethnographically, Mestia has always been regarded a chief community of Zemo, or Upper Svaneti province. It was formerly known as Seti (სეტი). The population is mostly Svans, a cultural and linguistic subgroup of the Georgians. Despite its small size, the townlet was an important centre of Georgian culture for centuries and contains a number of medieval monuments, such as churches and forts, included in a list of UNESCO World Heritage Sites.

Mestia is served by the Queen Tamar Airport, which is operated by the state-owned company United Airports of Georgia since 2010.

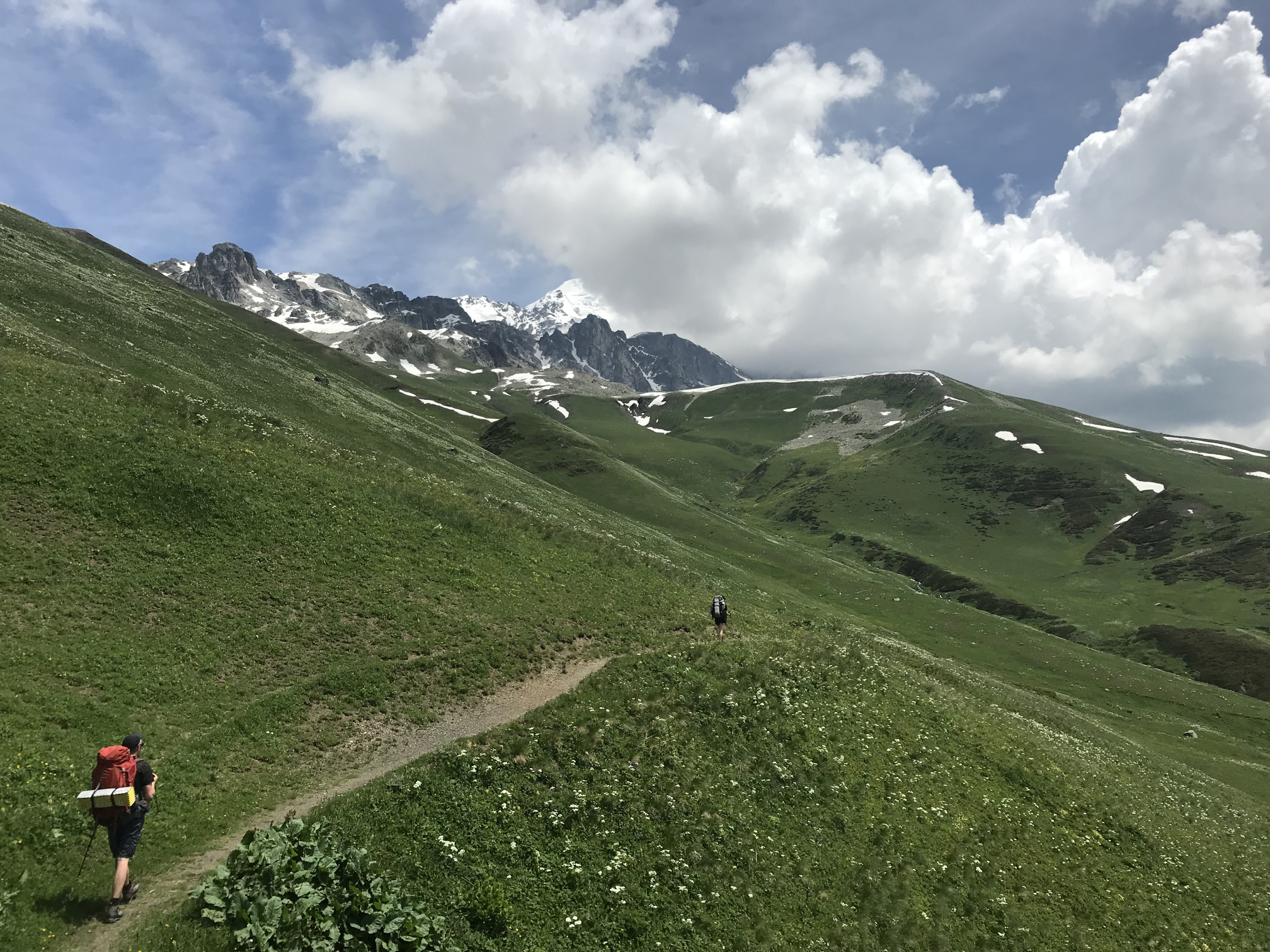
Mestia to Ushguli trail. Second day from Zhabeshi to Adishi

== Architecture and attractions ==
The townlet is dominated by stone defensive towers of a type seen in Ushguli and Mestia proper ("Svan towers"). A typical Svan fortified dwelling consisted of a tower, an adjacent house (machubi) and some other household structures encircled by a defensive wall.

Unique icons and manuscripts are kept in Mestia Historical-Ethnographic Museum. Mestia is also a centre of mountaineering tourism.

The town is the starting point for the popular Mestia-Ushguli trail. Most hikers complete this route in four days, sleeping in guesthouses or in local farmhouses.

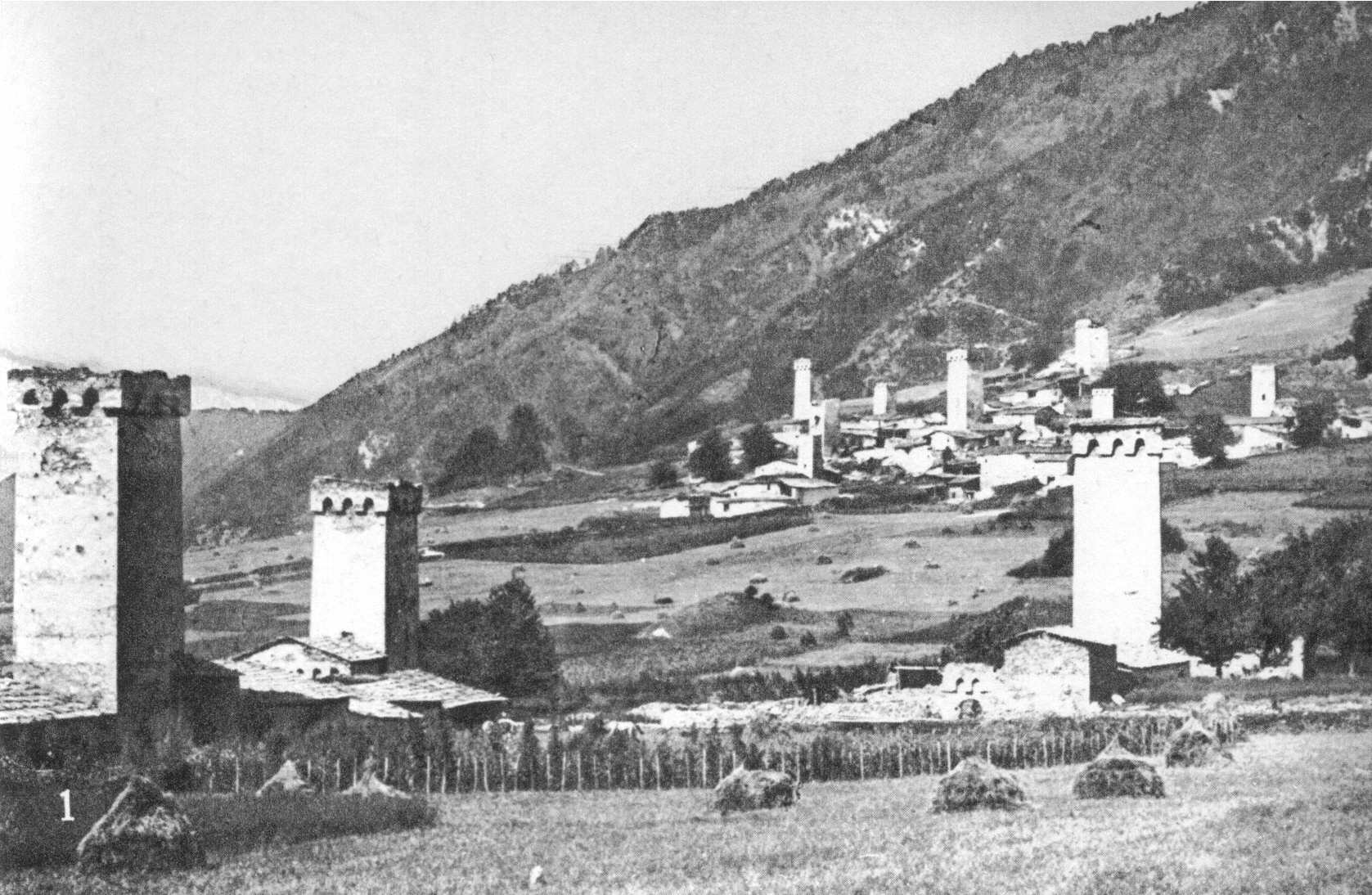
1890 photo of the village of Mestia

== Twin towns- Sister cities ==
- San Gimignano, Italy (since 1975)
- Telšiai, Lithuania (since 2018)

== Born in Mestia ==
- Mikheil Khergiani (1932–1969), a mountain climber

== See also ==
- Samegrelo-Zemo Svaneti
- Tviberi Glacier
- Administrative divisions of Georgia (country)
- Lists of World Heritage Sites#Asia
