= Svaneti uprising of 1875–1876 =

Svaneti uprising
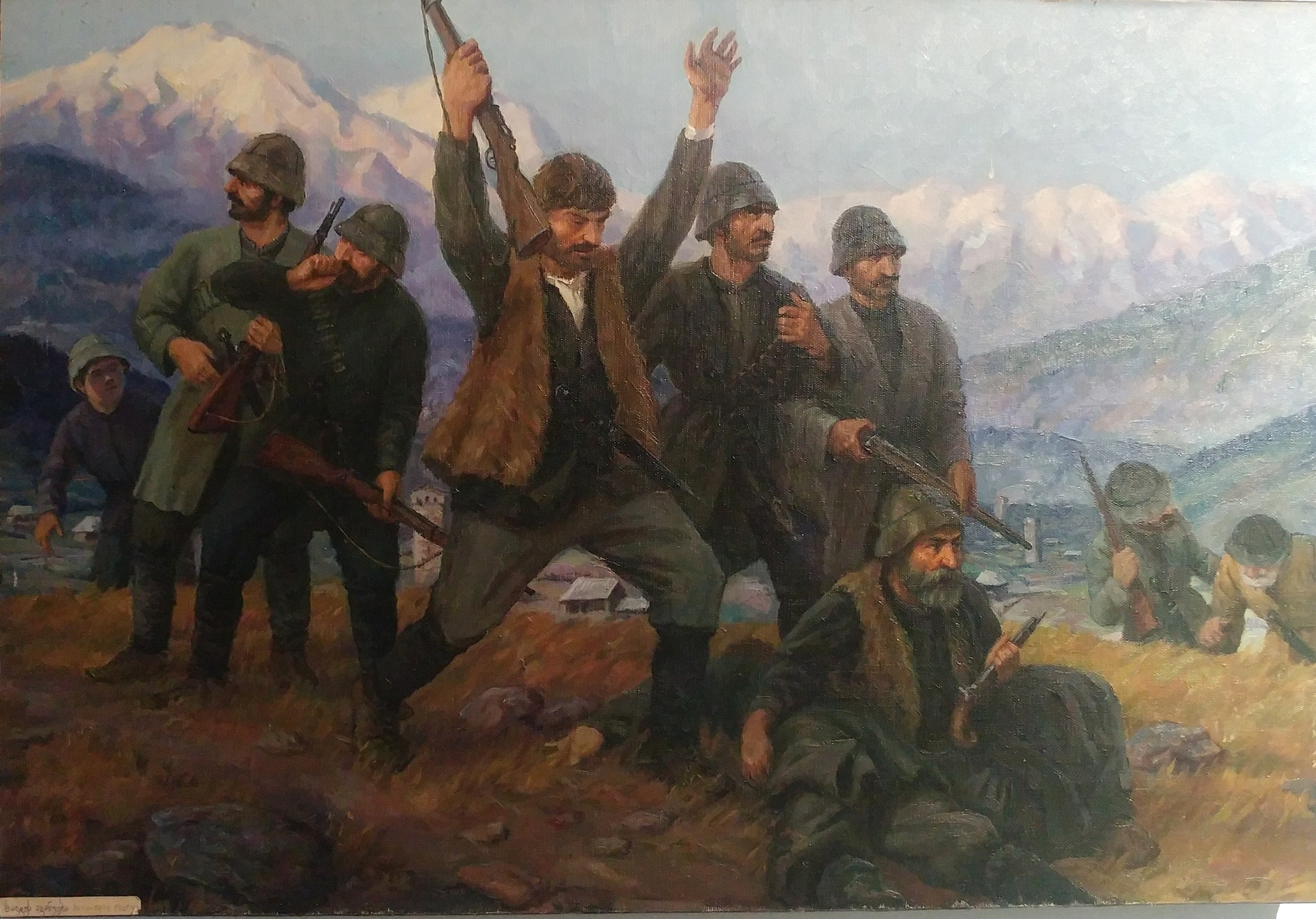
- "Svaneti uprising of 1875", from Lentekhi Museum
Date	1875–1876
Location	Svaneti, Kutaisi Governorate, Russian Empire
Result	Russian victory

Belligerents
Svan rebels	(Russia) Russian Empire

The Svaneti uprising of 1875–1876 also known as Svaneti-Khalde revolt, was an uprising directed against the policy of Russian Tsar Alexander II's administration in Svaneti. It was the third and the last armed uprising of Georgian mountaineers against the Russian Imperial rule, the other two being the Mtiuleti rebellion of 1804 and the Kakheti revolt of 1812.

== Historical background ==
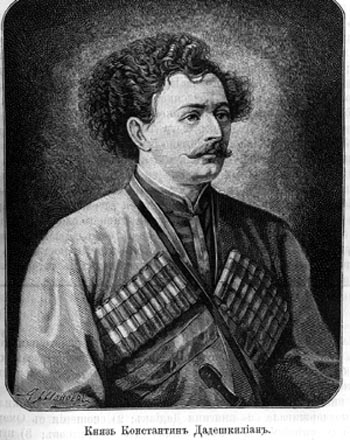
Konstantine (Murzakan) Dadeshkeliani, the last Prince of Principality of Svaneti.

Continuing dynastic strife in House of Dadeshkeliani, their defiance to the Russian government, and vacillation during the Crimean War (1854–1856), led to direct Russian intervention. In 1857, Prince Alexander Baryatinsky, Viceroy of the Caucasus, ordered Svaneti to be subdued by armed force. The ruling prince of Svaneti, Konstantine, chose to negotiate, but was ordered into exile to Erivan. On a farewell audience in Kutaisi, he quarreled with a local Russian administrator, Alexander Gagarin, and stabbed him to death along with three of his staff. When captured, Konstantine was summarily tried by court martial and shot. In 1858, the Principality of Svaneti was abolished and converted into a district administered by a Russian-appointed bailiff (pristav). Several members of the Dadeshekeliani family were exiled to the remote Russian provinces and those who remained in Georgia were deprived of their autonomous powers. On December 6, 1862 Prince Baryatinsky was relieved of his duties and temporarily replaced by Grigol Orbeliani.

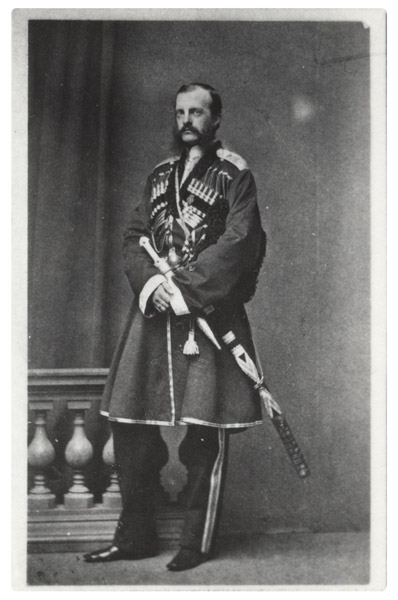
Grand Duke Michael Nikolaevich of Russia in the 1860s.

After these events for next 20 years Grand Duke Michael Nikolaevich served as both Viceroy of the Caucasus and commander of the Caucasus Military District.

== Local developments ==
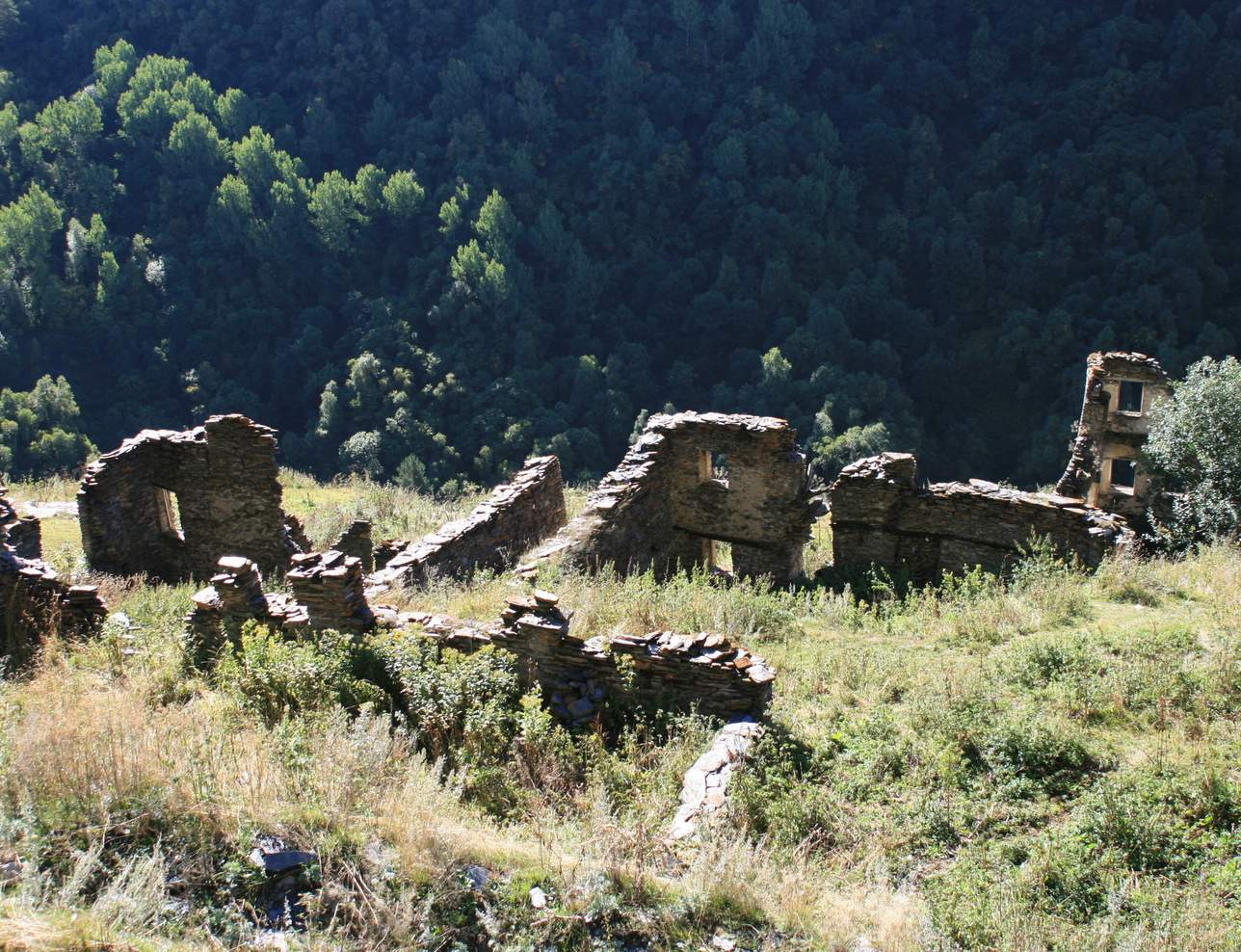
Khalde ruins, Georgia 2011 42°56′42″N 42°56′59″E

Russian administration began measurement of Svaneti lands and the people of Svaneti were convinced that the tsar's government going to introduce new taxes as well as military obligations. In June 1875, about 2,000 representatives of the clan-based Free Svaneti confederation gathered for Convention of Khevi oppressed by the tsarist regime and politics, entered the village Lalkhori in Samegrelo-Zemo Svaneti region. Gathered in Lalkhori where K. Sharvashidze and others. Under the command of Farjiani (Georgian: ფარჯიანი), an oath was sworn in the church of Kvirike that if the government did not give up it intentions, then they would defend themselves fighting with arms. Due to this situation, in July 1875 Russian administration sent a military expedition to Svaneti. Authorities promised the rebels that the government would not introduce new taxes or military commitments. They were able to neutralize the insurgents and entered Svaneti peacefully. Sixteen men were arrested and sentenced to several years in prison or deported from Svaneti for leading systematic protests against government measures and participating in the latest riots. From the accused G. Gasviani, Ch. Jokhadze and Sh. Kurdiani managed to escape. In the same year, 4 prisoners died in Kutaisi prison.

After a year of fruitless persecution, the civil and military administration of the region The inhabitants of Khalde demanded to provide the villagers with g. Gasviani et al. Jokhadze was reported to the police, otherwise the village was threatened with punishment. Due to non-compliance with the ultimatum, hundreds of soldiers entered the village and the soldiers stormed the residents. The Chaldeans set fire to the occupants from their towers, killing the platoon chief, the patriarch, and several soldiers. This was followed by the death or wounding of the head of the district, Bokaul, the conciliatory judge, as well as several civilians and military personnel (almost a whole hundred were destroyed in the very first battle, only a few of the Khaldites were wounded).

Due to the alarming situation, a new large military expedition was sent to Svaneti. A regular army unit of 1200 men, an artillery battery, a detachment of destroyers and a hundred militiamen under the leadership of General Erast Tsytovich arrived at the Lower Svaneti Gate. At the same time, military units of the North Caucasus Line were brought to readiness, which, if necessary, were to invade Svaneti from the north and west. On the morning of August 21, 1876, the attack began, which ended on August 27 with the capture of the rebels, the capture of Khalde, and the complete annihilation. The 8 obsessed men were sentenced by a military court to life imprisonment or deportation to the far side. In the meantime, 22 participants of the uprising were arrested, and the Georgian society was restored to protect them. Tsereteli, N. Nikoladze, D. Lortkipanidze, L. Led by Lolua et al. Despite fervent sympathy and support, all participants in the uprising were sentenced to long prison terms or life imprisonment. At the same time, the settlement in Khalde was banned, it was renamed New Ifral.

== Legacy ==
The famous Svans song "Gaulgavkhe" was dedicated to the uprising.
Simon Janashia Museum of Georgia in 2007 had an exhibition dedicated to uprising.

== See also ==
- Free Svaneti
- Principality of Svaneti
- 1804 Mtiuleti rebellion
