= List of bivalves of Hawaii =

This is a list of bivalves of Hawaii. 139 species of bivalves are found in Hawaiian waters, of which 66 are endemic.

Bivalves
Hawaiian language name	Genus	Common name	Scientific name	Family	Common family name	Endemic
'Olepe papaua	Arca	Ventricose ark shell	Arca ventricosa	Arcidae	Ark clam	N
Nahawele 'ili 'ili	Bronchriatus	Hawaiian mussel	Bronchriatus crebristriatus	Mytilidae	Mussel	Y
	Pinna	Prickly pin clam	Pinna muricata	Pinnidae	Pin clam	N
Nahawele	Pinna	Baggy pen shell	Streptopinna saccata	Pinnidae	Pin clam	N
Pā	Pinctada	Black-lipped pearl oyster	Pinctada margaritifera	Pteriidae	Pearl oyster	Y
Pā	Pteria	Winged pearl oyster	Pteria brunnea	Pteriidae	Pearl oyster	Y
Nahawele	Isognomon	Black purse shell	Isognocom californicum	Isognomonidae	Purse shell	N
Nahawele	Isognomon	Brown purse shell	Isognocom perna	Isognomonidae	Purse shell	N
	Haumea	Judd's scallop	Haumea juddi	Pectinidae	Scallop	Y
	Lamaria	Fragile file shell	Lamaria fragilis	Limidae	File shell	N
	Spondylus	Spiny oyster	Spondylus icobaricus	Spondylidae	Thorny oyster	N
	Spondylus	Cliff oyster	Spondylus violescens	Spondylidae	Thorny oyster	N
	Crassotrea	Japanese oyster	Crassotrea gigas	Ostreidae	True oyster	N
	Dendostrea	Hawaiian oyster	Dendostrea sandvicensis	Ostreidae	True oyster	Y
Pupu kupa	Vasticardium	Rounded cockle	Vasticardium orbita hawaiensis	Cardiidae	Cockle	Y
	Tellina	Rasp tellin	Tellina scobinata	Tellinidae	Tellin	N
