= Lamaria Church =

- Church of the Mother of God
- უშგულის ლამარია
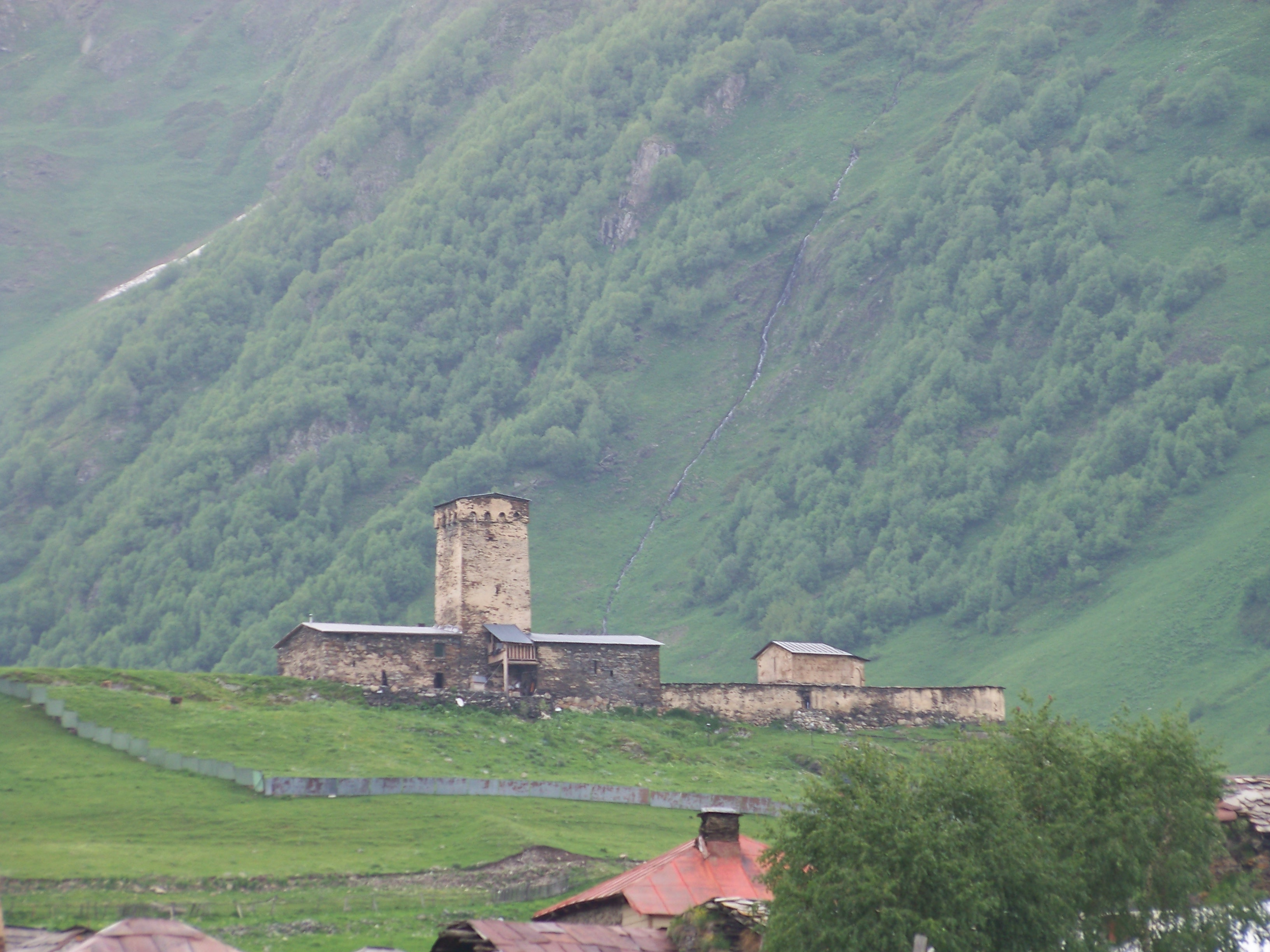
- Lamaria church complex viewed from a distance

- Location of Zhibiani
- 42.918354°N 43.019656°E
- Location: Zhibiani, Ushguli, Mestia Municipality
- Tradition: Georgian Orthodoxy

Architecture
- Functional status: Active
- Heritage designation: Immovable Cultural Monuments of National Significance
- Years built: 9th-10th centuries

The Ushguli Church of the Mother of God, (Note: Georgian: უშგულის ღვთისმშობილის სახელობის ეკლესია romanized: ushgulis ghvtismshobilis sakhelobis ek'lesia) popularly known as the Lamaria Church, (Note: Georgian: უშგულის ლამარია romanized: ushgulis lamaria) is a medieval Georgian Orthodox church in the community of Ushguli in Upper Svaneti. It is a simple hall church, with a projecting apse and an ambulatory. The interior contains two layers of medieval frescoes, in a state of deterioration. The church is inscribed on the list of the Immovable Cultural Monuments of National Significance of Georgia.

== Location ==
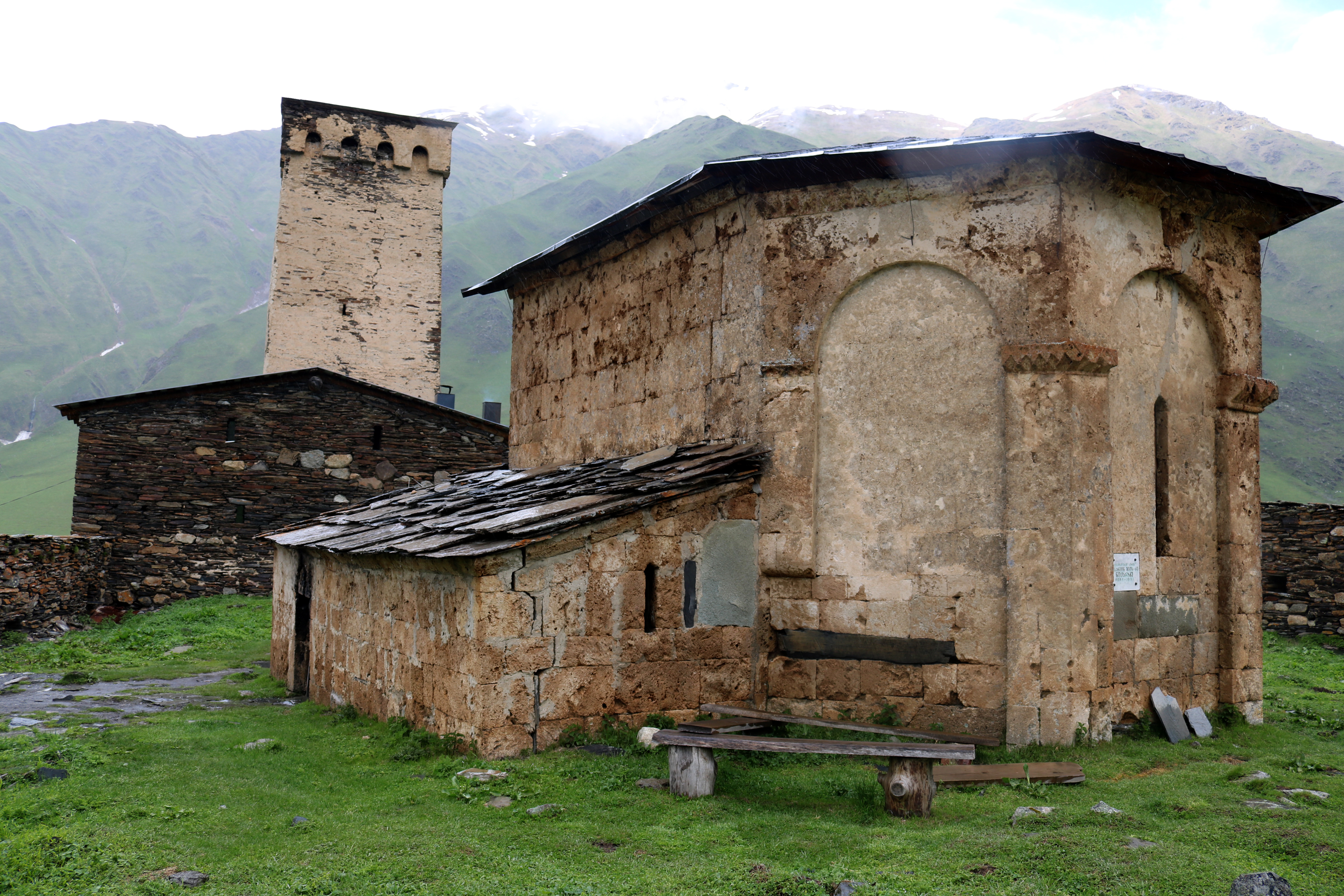
Lamaria church.

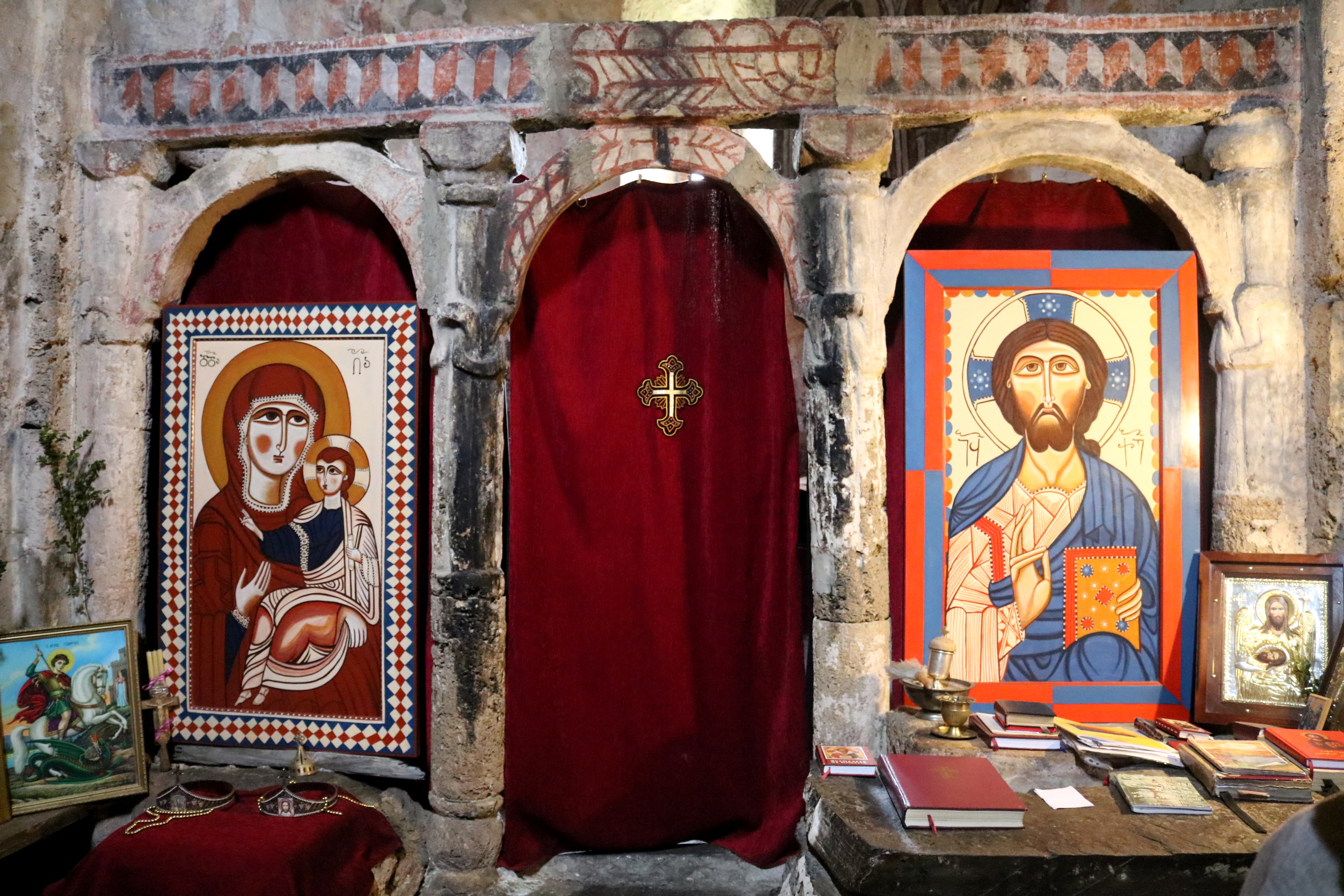
Iconostasis.

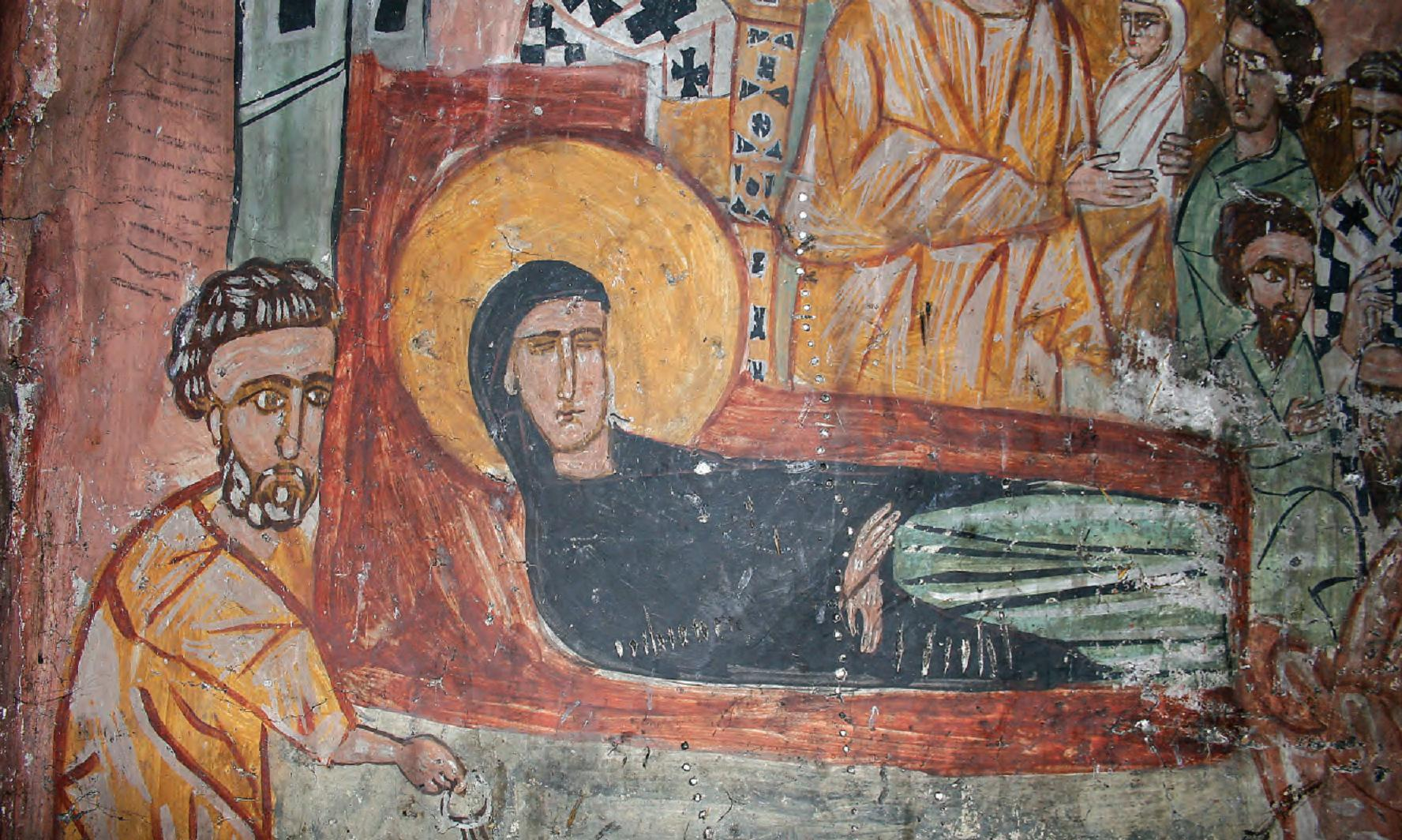
Fresco depicting the Dormition of the Mother of God.

The Lamaria church is situated on the northern outskirts of the highland village of Zhibiani, a constituent village of Ushguli, in Mestia Municipality. Zhibiani is one of the highest permanently inhabited places in Europe, located at 2,100 above sea level. The building tops a hill above the village, set against the backdrop of the 5,201 metre-high Shkhara peak of the Greater Caucasus range and the highest point in Georgia. The church is surrounded by a low stone wall and defended by a Svan tower standing on its west end.

== History ==
The Lamaria church does not appear in historical records. Judging by its architectural features, the church is dated to the 9th or 10th century. It is dedicated to the Dormition of the Mother of God. "Lamaria" is a name applied by the local Svan people to Mary, mother of Jesus, whose veneration became superimposed on the ancient, pre-Christian cult of Lamaria, a female deity of motherhood and fertility.

According to a local legend, the Lamaria church was the scene of the murder of the nobleman Puta Dachkelani, a Dadeshkeliani, who sought to impose his rule on the free people of Ushguli. The legend has it that the entire village helped pull a cord attached to the trigger of a musket, thus dividing equally the responsibility for killing the man. Dachkelani's garments are said to have been preserved at the church for a long time.

Lamaria housed a collection of dozens of church items—manuscripts, icons, crosses, and various utensils—which were catalogued by the scholar Ekvtime Taqaishvili during his expedition to Svaneti in 1910. The church is functional and currently serves as the seat of a Georgian Orthodox bishop of Mestia and Zemo Svaneti.

== Layout ==
Lamaria is a hall church, with a prominently projecting triangular apse and a relatively large ambulatory enveloping the church on the south and west. The church is built of neatly hewn limestone blocks. The ambulatory has two doors: one is a low arched door cut in its south segment; the other, in its west portion, leads to the nave. The latter is an oblong rectangular hall which ends in a relatively shallow semicircular apse, placed three small steps above the floor level. The apse is separated from the nave by an original three-arched stone iconostasis. The vault is divided into two equal parts by a supporting arch.

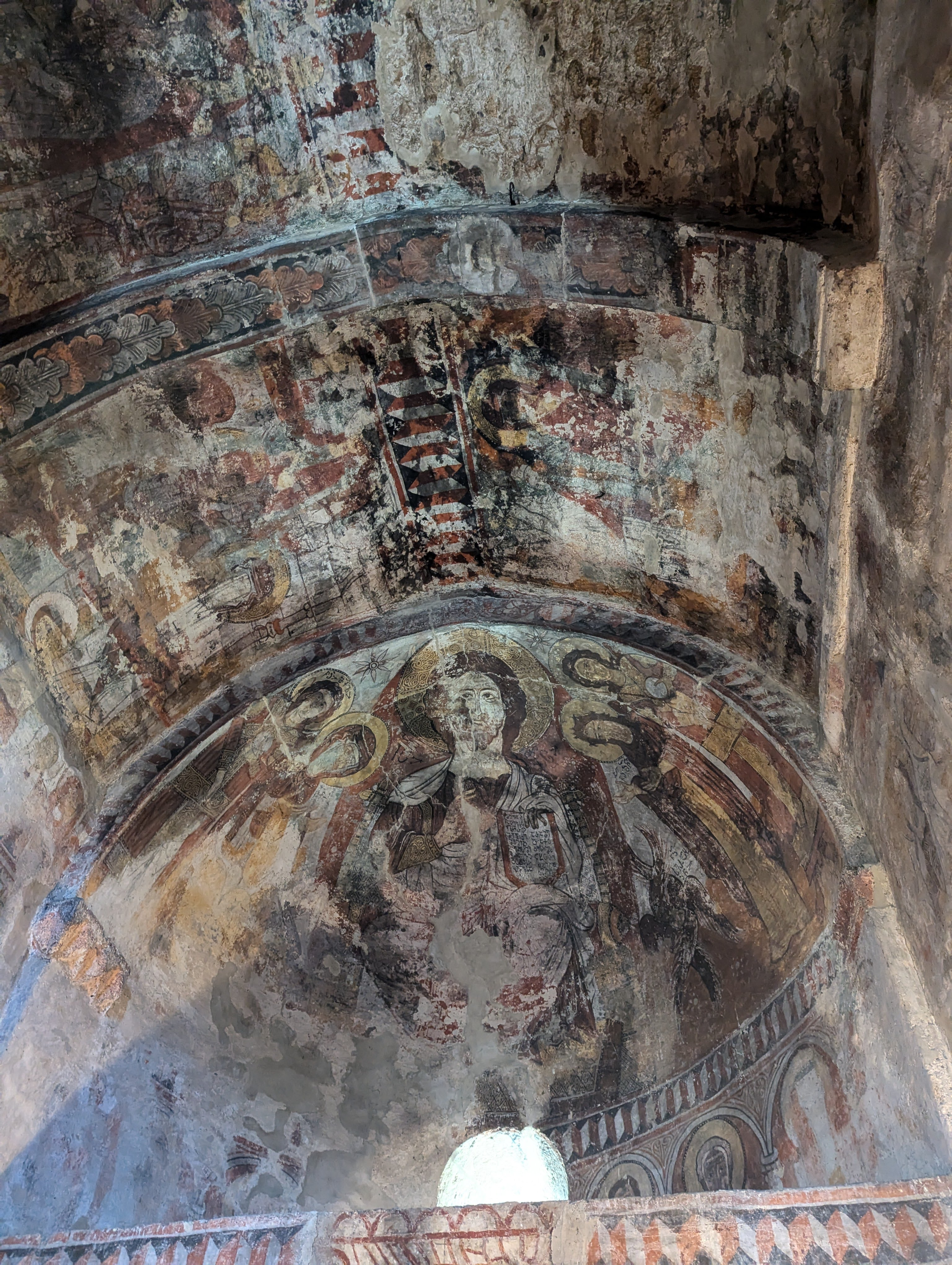
Apse paintings.

The church is sparsely lit by two windows, one each in the apse and west wall. Both the internal walls and iconostasis are covered with two layers of now faded frescoes, the earlier dated to the 10th century and the second layer painted over in the 13th century. The ambulatory was also frescoed, but only fragments of its 13th-century paintings survive. The exterior bears scarce decorative stonework. The west façade has a cross, sculpted in relief, and a slab with a four-line Georgian inscription, in a mixed khutsuri-mkhedruli script, paleographically dated to the 11th century and mentioning a female donor, named Gurandukht. The church also contains several scratched graffiti, dated from the 10th century into the 18th.
