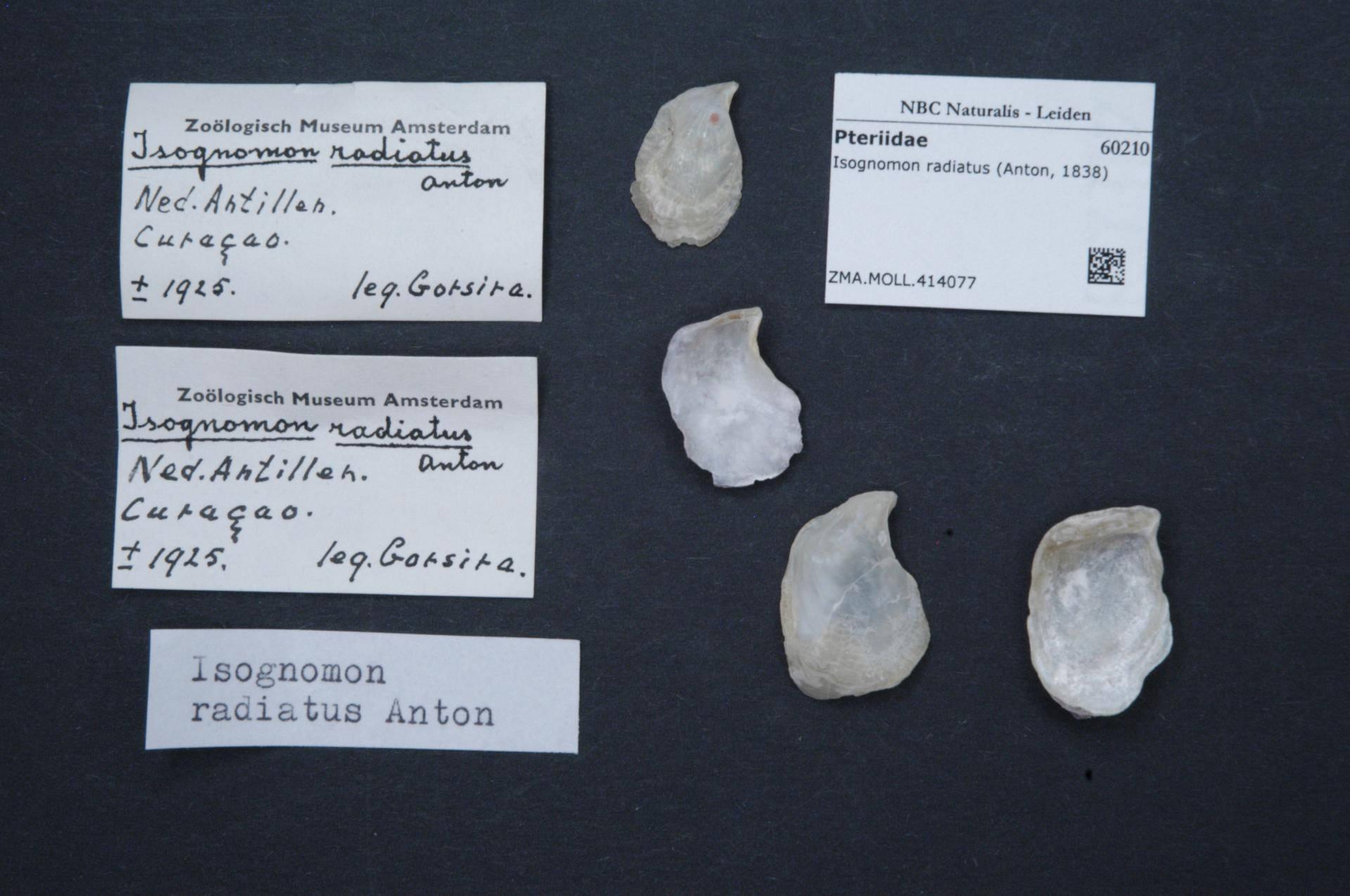

Scientific classification
- Kingdom: Animalia
- Phylum: Mollusca
- Class: Bivalvia
- Order: Pteriida
- Family: Isognomonidae
- Genus: Isognomon
- Species: I. radiatus

Binomial name
- Isognomon radiatus (Anton, 1839)

Synonyms
- Perna radiatus Anton, 1838; Perna listeri Hanley, 1843; Perna lamarckeana d'Orbigny in Sagra, 1853; Perna vulsella Lamarck, 1819

= Isognomon radiatus =

Species of bivalve

Isognomon radiatus, the radial purse oyster or Lister's tree oyster, is a species of bivalve mollusc in the family Isognomonidae. It can be found along the Atlantic coast of North America, ranging from southern Florida to Brazil and Bermuda.

== Description ==
Lister's tree oyster is an irregular, fan-shaped shell growing to about 7 centimetres (2.8 in) long. Each valve is a pale brown colour with whitish rays radiating from the umbo, the raised hump that is the first part of the shell to form when the animal is a juvenile. There are numerous sculptured concentric rings on the outside surface. It is attached to a hard substrate by byssus threads and often occurs in clusters.

== Distribution and habitat ==
Lister's tree oyster occurs in southern Florida, the Caribbean Sea and Gulf of Mexico, Bermuda, the West Indies, the Cayman Islands and Brazil. It grows, sometimes in dense patches, on the roots of mangroves and on shallow rocky areas, down to a depth of about 15 metres (49 ft). On coral reefs it occurs on rock ledges and exposed rocks in areas of high sedimentation, forming mats of hundreds of individual animals. It also grows on the shells of the Atlantic thorny oyster (Spondylus americanus). In Little Cayman it occupies a particular zone on the lower shore and shallow subtidal region of sheltered bays where it is common under large stones, often accompanied by the rock boring urchin (Echinometra lucunter). It also occurs in rock pools. In more exposed locations on the island it is replaced by the closely related flat tree oyster (Isognomon alatus). Lister's tree oyster is a constituent of the characteristic invertebrate fauna of the mangrove swamps fringing the southern part of Florida.
