= Bartolomei =

Bartolomei is an Italian surname. Notable people with the surname include:

- Giuseppe Bartolomei (1923–1996), Italian politician
- Ivan Bartolomei (1813–1870), Russian military officer, antiquarian, and writer
- Marisa Bartolomei, American cell biologist
- Paolo Bartolomei (born 1989), Italian footballer
- Renato Bartolomei (born 1963), New Zealand actor

== See also ==
- Agostino Di Bartolomei (1955–1994), Italian footballer
