= Ienashi church =

Georgian Orthodox church

Ienashi church of the Prophet Jonah
- იენაშის იონა წინასწარმეტყველის ეკლესია
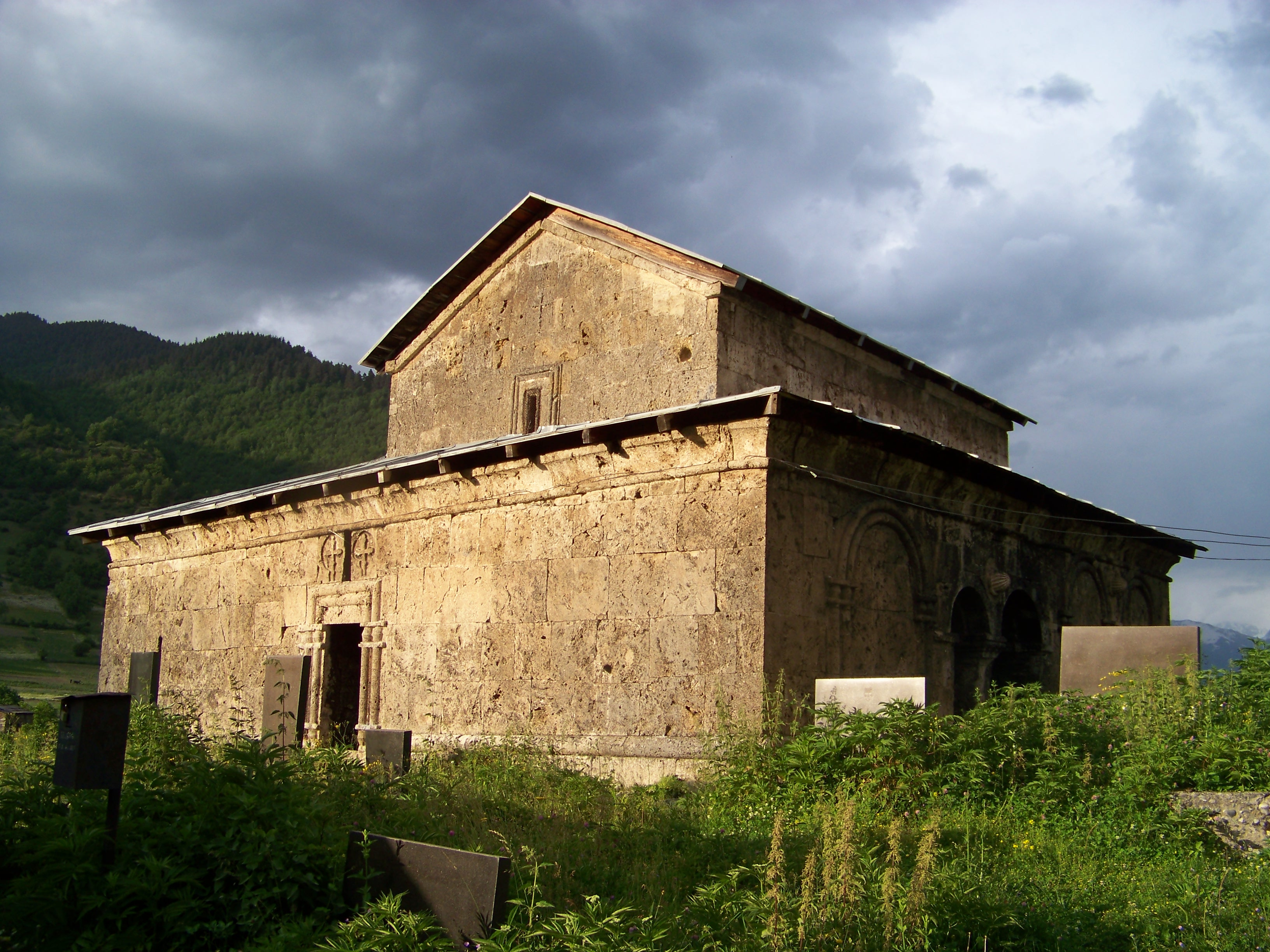
- Ienashi church of the Prophet Jonah
- Interactive map of Ienashi church of the Prophet Jonah
- Location: Ienashi, Mestia Municipality, Samegrelo-Zemo Svaneti, Georgia
- Coordinates: 43.012363°N 42.630115°E
- Type: Hall church

The Ienashi church of the Prophet Jonah (Georgian: იენაშის იონა წინასწარმეტყველის ეკლესია, romanized: ienashis iona ts'inasts'armet'q'velis ek'lesia), also known as the church of Ian (Svan: ჲან), is a medieval Georgian Orthodox church in Mestia, Upper Svaneti. The church was built sometime between the 12th and 14th centuries, but reflects an earlier Georgian practice by having a semi-open aisle—an ambulatory—terminating in an apse to the east of the main nave of the building. The church is inscribed on the list of the Immovable Cultural Monuments of National Significance of Georgia.

== Location ==
The church of the Prophet Jonah is situated in the village of Ienashi, at 1360 m above sea level, in the Latali territorial unit of the Mestia Municipality, at the foothills of the Greater Caucasus. This part of Svaneti was known as Free Svaneti in the 19th century. There are no contemporary literary sources on the construction and history of Ienashi. The church and the items preserved in it were first described, in greatest details, by the scholar Ekvtime Taqaishvili during his expedition to Svaneti in 1910.

== Layout ==
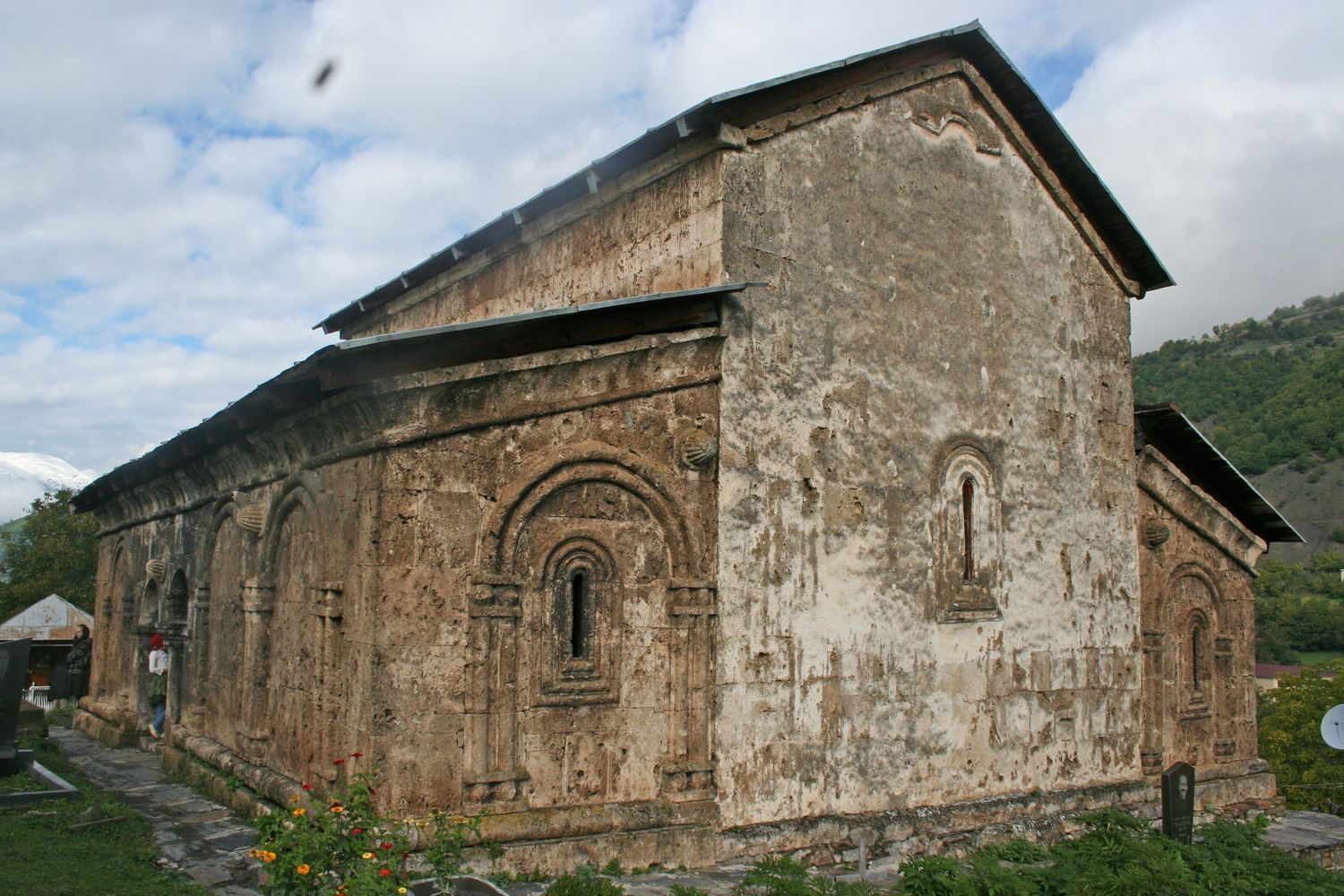
Eastern façade.

The Ienashi church is built of evenly cut limestone blocks. It is a hall church, with an ambulatory running on three sides and terminating in an apse on the east. The interior is divided up into bays by a pair of two-step pilasters which support a vaulted arch. The church is lit by windows cut in the sanctuary apse and central west wall; a window in the south wall is blocked by an outer annex attached to the wall. Arched niches flank the window in the apse. There are two doors, on the south and west. The church has two annexes, both arched in the interior and covered with architraves on the exterior. The façades are scarcely decorated in stonework. The building is based on a two-step socle and crowned by a pronounced cornice.

The interior is adorned with a series of frescoes, but they are heavily damaged. The style of the paintings is a local take on the late Byzantine Palaeologan art. Depicted are the Savior, the cross of Golgotha, David, Solomon, Jonah and the whale, the saints Peter and Paul, the Church Fathers, and an unidentified royal person, probably Constantine I of Imereti (r. 1293–1327).

The church formerly housed many unique items; some of them were lost in a series of burglaries, others were recovered and removed for safekeeping to the Svaneti Museum of History and Ethnography in Mestia. Among these items were the Ienashi Gospel book—a 13th-century illuminated Georgian manuscript—as well the icons with gilded and silver elements, such those of the Savior and the saints George and Theodore, and precious metal crosses, one being an Italian import of the 13th–14th century.
