= Pedalion =

Pedalion may refer to:

- A synonym of the genus Isognomon
- A synonym of the genus Oxyrhachis (treehopper)
- A 19th-century collection of canon law by Nicodemus the Hagiorite
