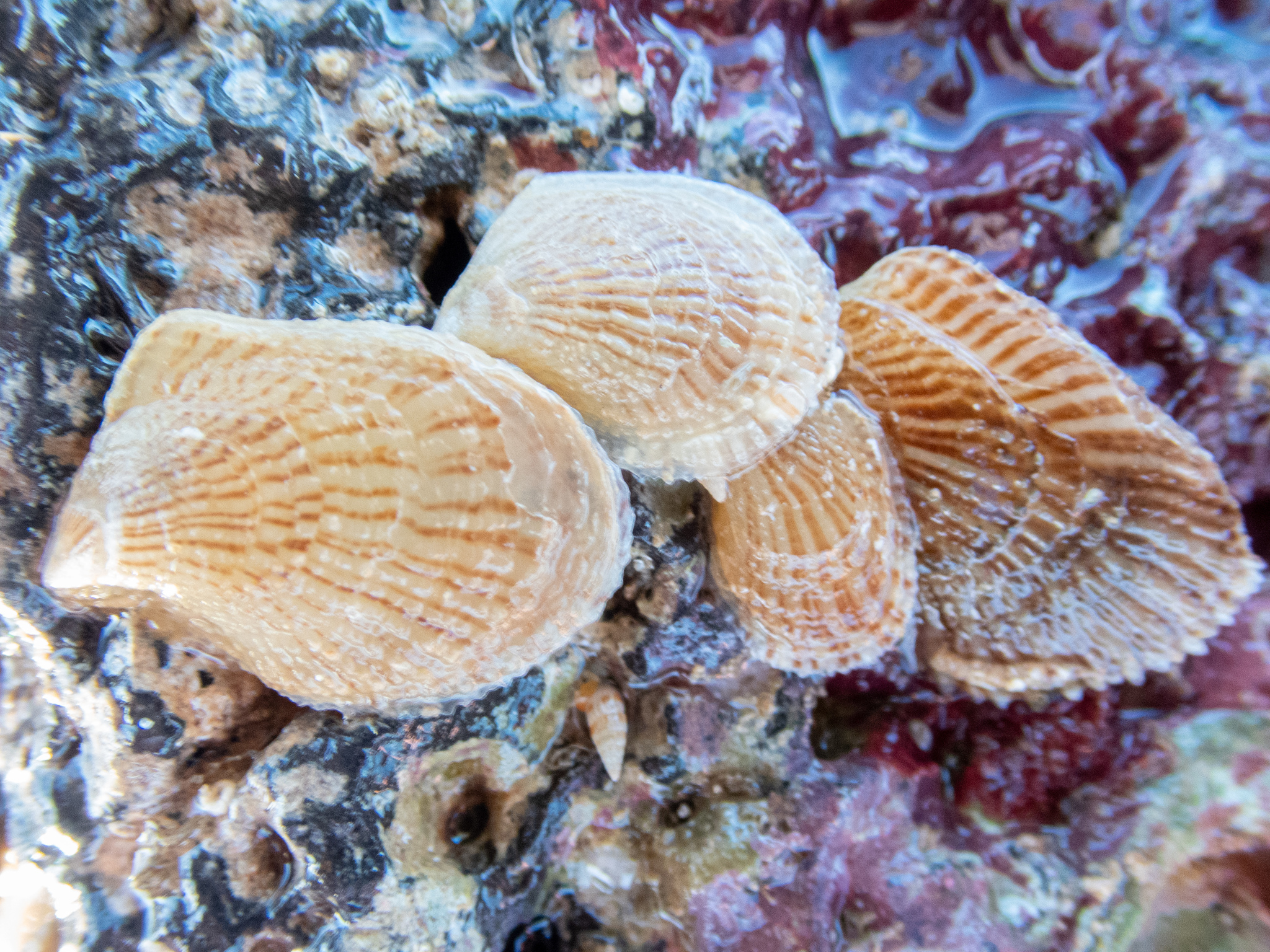

Scientific classification
- Kingdom: Animalia
- Phylum: Mollusca
- Class: Bivalvia
- Order: Pteriida
- Family: Isognomonidae
- Genus: Isognomon
- Species: I. perna

Binomial name
- Isognomon perna (Linnaeus, 1767)

Synonyms
- List: Isognomon roberti H. J. Koch, 1953; Isognomon sulcatum (Lamarck, 1819); Isogonum marsupiale Röding, 1798; Melina pernaeformis Philipsson, 1788; Ostrea perna Linnaeus, 1767; Perna costellata Conrad, 1837; Perna eremita Gould, 1850; Perna limoides Reeve, 1858; Perna linnaei Dunker, 1869; Perna marsupium Lamarck, 1819; Perna samoensis Baird, 1873; Perna sulcata Lamarck, 1819

= Isognomon perna =

Species of bivalve

Isognomon perna, the brown purse shell or rayed tree oyster, is a bivalve in the family Isognomonidae common in the Indo-Pacific including Hawaii.

== Description ==
Isognoma perna colors range from a brown or light-yellow purse shell to beige with a brown striped pattern and resembles a miniature clam.

== Distribution ==
Commonly found in the Indo-Pacific, including Hawaii, Western Polynesia, Eastern Polynesia, North to Japan Eastern to Southern Africa, New Caledonia, and Society Islands.

== Habitat ==
Isognomon perna live at depths of 0-20m in tropical climates; byssally attach to rocks, reef flats, or the underside of boulders. Commonly found under rocks in shallow water and arranged one on top of the other.
