= Isognomon californicus =

Species of mollusc

Isognomon californicus, the black purse shell or nahawele in Hawaiian, is a species of bivalve in the family Isognomonidae. It was first formally named in 1837 by Timothy Abbott Conrad as Perna californica. Despite the name being closely named after California, this is misleading as this species is endemic to Hawaii.

== Distribution and habitat ==
Isognomon californicus
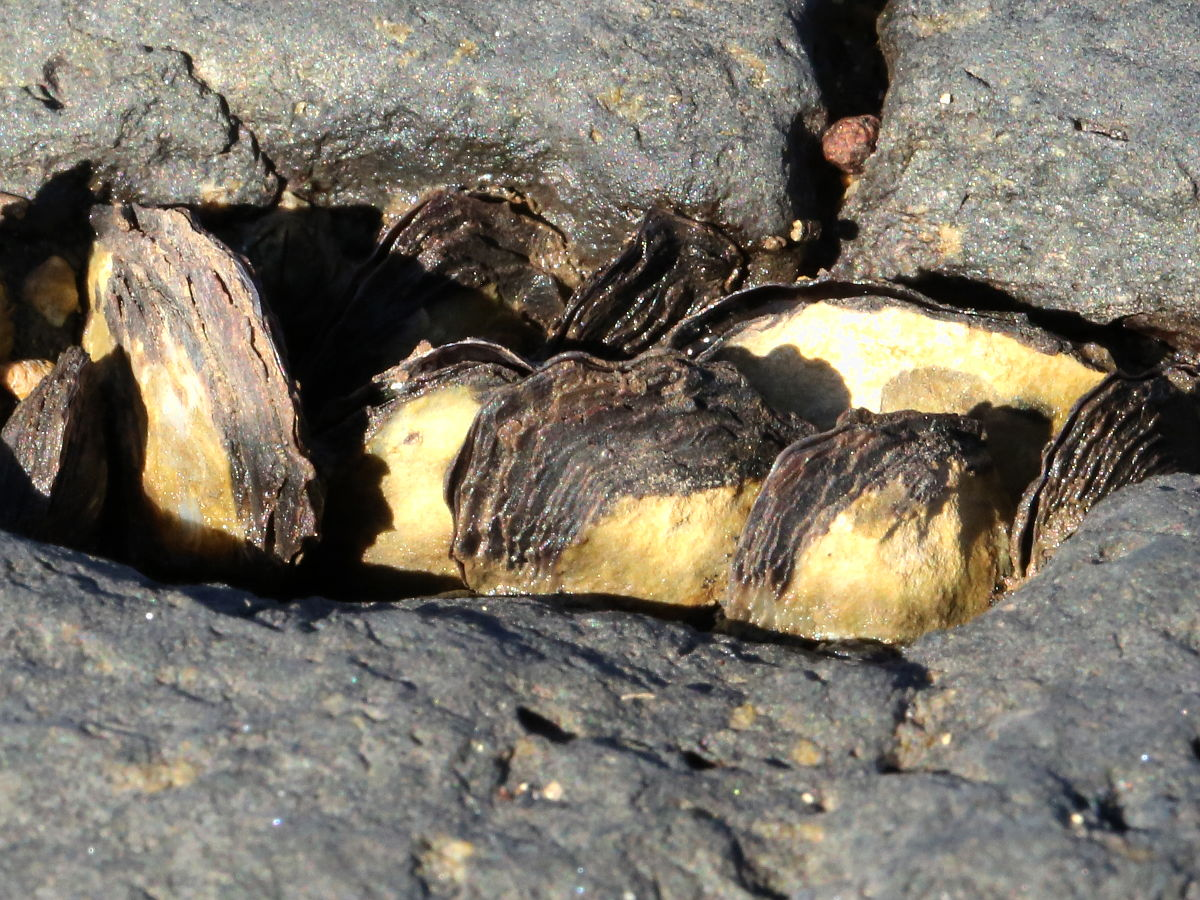

Scientific classification
- Kingdom: Animalia
- Phylum: Mollusca
- Class: Bivalvia
- Order: Pteriida
- Family: Isognomonidae
- Genus: Isognomon
- Species: I. californicus

Binomial name
- Isognomon californicus (Conrad, 1837)

Synonyms
- Perna californica Conrad, 1837; Perna hawaiiensis Pease, 1871; Perna vitrea Reeve, 1858

Isognomon californicus is endemic to the Hawaiian Islands. This species can be found in brackish environments in crevices near or around the high tide line. Very rarely will this species be found in water that is calm or steady.

== Description ==
The Black Purse Shell often looks flat, thin, and irregular in appearance with a flaky exterior and pearly interior. Black purse shells happen to be a very small species of mollusks only growing to be around one to one and a half inches in length. This species of mollusk has the ability to wedge itself onto rocks and lock itself in places making it steadfast in preventing the water and or other species from prying it off the rock.
