= Principality of Svaneti =

Georgian principality (1463–1858)

Principality of Svaneti სვანეთის სამთავრო
- 1463–1858
- 18th century coat of arms according to Vakhushti

- Principality of Svaneti in the 15th century

- Status: subject of Kingdom of Imereti
- Capital: Not specified 42°54′59″N 43°00′41″E
- Common languages: Official; Georgian Native Svan
- Religion: Orthodox Christianity (Georgian Orthodox Church)
- Government: Principality
- Prince of Svaneti
- Historical era: Late Middle Ages
  - Established: 1463
  - duchy of Kingdom of Georgia: 1008-1490
  - subject of Kingdom of Imereti: 1463-1833
  - vassal of Russian Empire: 1833-1857
  - Disestablished: 1857- 1858
Preceded by	Succeeded by
Kingdom of Georgia; Kingdom of Imereti	Russian Empire
- Today part of: Georgia

The Principality of Svaneti (Georgian: სვანეთის სამთავრო, romanized: svanetis samtavro) was a small principality (samtavro) in the Svaneti region of the Greater Caucasus mountains that emerged following the breakup of the Kingdom of Georgia in the late 15th century. It was ruled successively by the houses of Gelovani and Dadeshkeliani, and was annexed to the Russian Empire in 1858.

== Early history ==
Svaneti lies in northwestern Georgia, along two broad upland valleys located to the south of Mount Elbrus – the upper Enguri River valley in the west and the upper Tskhenistskali and its tributary, the Kheladula, in the east. In the period of Georgian unity (1008–1463), it was a duchy (saeristavo) within the Bagratid kingdom of Georgia ruled first by the house of Vardanidze from the late 11th to the 14th century, and then by that of Gelovani which established themselves as virtually independent princes when Georgia fragmented, in the 1460s (officially 1490/1491), into three kingdoms – Kartli, Kakheti, and Imereti – and several regional principalities and feudal enclaves.

A series of Ottoman invasions and civil wars in western Georgia resulted in a breakdown of communications and the mountainous regions became increasingly isolated. In Svaneti, a medieval feudal system effectively collapsed and once flourishing regional Georgian Orthodox culture went in decline to the point of reversal to some pagan practices. The highlanders of Svaneti entrenched themselves in their difficultly accessible villages fortified with chains of defensive towers and were only passively involved in the turmoil that filled Georgia, leading to the relative lack of written records about Svaneti from that period. Their relations with the neighbors on the other side of the Caucasus range, chiefly Kabarda and Balkars, were often hostile, although trade via mountainous passes and intermarriages among the noble families were also common.

== Civil strife and Russian annexation ==
The two valleys of Svaneti

= Upper Svaneti = Lower Svaneti

= Kodori valley which also has a Svan population

Between the 17th and 19th centuries, Svaneti fragmented into three political entities. The first, Lower Svaneti in the upper Tskhenistskali valley, dominated by the clans of Gelovani and Gardabkhadze, was gradually subjugated by the Dadiani princes of Mingrelia and came to be known as Dadiani Svaneti. The second, Upper Svaneti, lay along the upper reaches of the Enguri river for whose control the families of Richgviani and Dadeshkeliani vied. The latter clan emerged as the eventual winners by the 1720s and established their rule on the territory to the west of the Enguri, which henceforth came to be known as Dadeshkeliani Svaneti (Principality of Svaneti). The communities to the east of the Enguri seceded, however, and organized themselves into a confederation of clans which was deprived of any centralized government and was known as "Free Svaneti".

In the 1820s, the Principality of Svaneti effectively split into two as a result of a blood feud between the rival Dadeshkeliani branches. Through the mediation by the princes of Mingrelia, both branches accepted nominal Russian suzerainty in 1833 as did the Free Svanetian communities in 1840. Nevertheless, they continued to run their affairs independently and did not allow Russian officials or church missions into the area until the late 1840s.

Continuing dynastic strife among the Dadishkeliani, their defiance to the Russian government, and vacillation during the Crimean War (1854–1856), however, led to direct Russian intervention. In 1857, Prince Alexander Baryatinsky, Viceroy of the Caucasus, ordered Svaneti to be subdued by armed force. The ruling prince of Svaneti, Constantine, chose to negotiate, but was ordered into exile to Erivan. On a farewell audience in Kutaisi, he quarreled with a local Russian administrator, Alexander Gagarin, and stabbed him to death along with three of his staff. When captured, Constantine was summarily tried by court martial and shot. In 1858, the principality was abolished and converted into a district administered by a Russian-appointed officer (pristav). Several members of the Dadeshekeliani family were exiled to the remote Russian provinces and those who remained in Georgia were deprived of their autonomous powers.

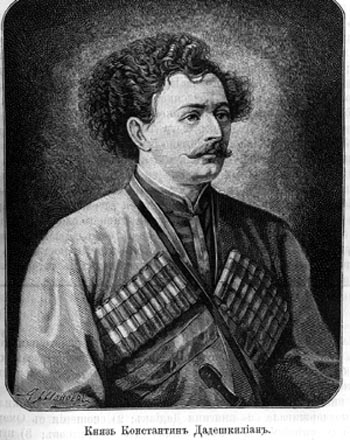
Konstantine Dadeshkeliani, last Prince of Svaneti.

== Rulers ==
=== Duchy of Svaneti (X-XV) ===
- John I
- Vakhdang
- Bakur
- Vardan I
- Jinjikh
- John II
- Vardan II
- John III
- Baram
- Arashiani
- Khazhig
- Ozbeg
- Shamadavla
- Abesalom

== See also ==
- Svaneti uprising of 1875–1876
