= Erast Tsytovich =

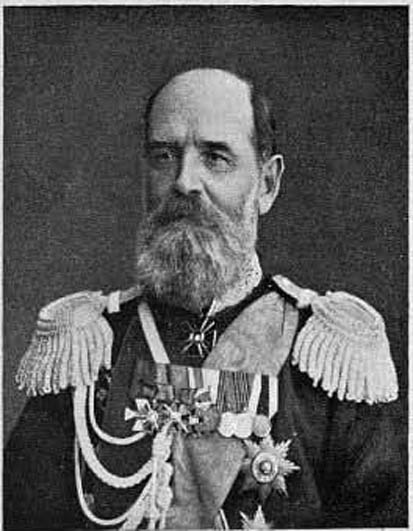
Tzytovitch Erast Stepanovitch

Erast Stepanovich Tsytovich (Russian: Эраст Степанович Цытович, 28 February 1830 – 27 January 1898) was an Imperial Russian military commander. By the end of his nearly five decades of service, Tsytovich attained to the rank of General of the Infantry in 1895. He took part in the 1849 Hungarian campaign, the Caucasus War (including the 1876 pacification campaign of Free Svanetia, known as Svaneti uprising of 1875–1876), and the 1877–78 Russo-Turkish War. From 1896 to his death, Tsytovich sat in the Imperial Military Council.
