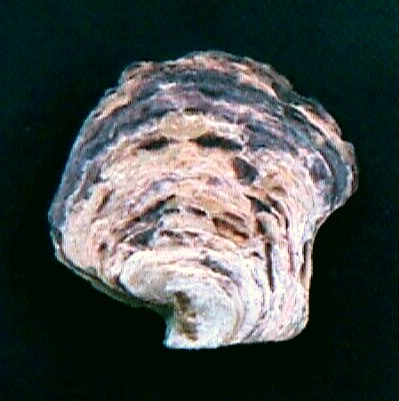

Scientific classification
- Kingdom: Animalia
- Phylum: Mollusca
- Class: Bivalvia
- Order: Pteriida
- Family: Isognomonidae
- Genus: Isognomon
- Species: I. alatus

Binomial name
- Isognomon alatus (Gmelin, 1791)

Synonyms
- Ostrea alatus Gmelin, 1791; Ostrea rostralis Lamarck, 1819; Perna ephippium Reeve, 1858; Perna obliqua Lamarck, 1819

= Isognomon alatus =

Species of bivalve

Isognomon alatus, the flat tree oyster, is a species of bivalve mollusc in the family Isognomonidae. It can be found along the Atlantic coast of North America, ranging from southern Florida to Brazil and Bermuda.

== Description ==
The flat tree oyster has two thin, irregularly shaped valves joined by a long straight hinge. The exterior is sculptured by a large number of rough, concentric rings with loose flakes and varies in colour from a pale brownish olive to a purplish black. The nacre on the inside is lustrous and cream coloured shaded with purplish brown. The shell is attached to the substrate by a byssus thread and grows to about 75 to 95 millimetres (3.0 to 3.7 in) in length.

== Distribution and habitat ==
The flat tree oyster is found in southern Florida, the Caribbean Sea and Gulf of Mexico, Colombia, Costa Rica, Cuba, Jamaica, Lesser Antilles, Puerto Rico, Venezuela, San Andrés and Brazil. It is one of three closely related species that are found, sometimes in dense patches, on the roots of mangroves, especially the red mangrove (Rhizophora mangle) and on shallow rocky areas, down to depths of 15 metres (49 ft) or more. On coral reefs it occurs on rock ledges and exposed rocks in areas of high sedimentation, forming mats of hundreds of individual animals. It also grows on the shells of the Atlantic thorny oyster (Spondylus americanus).

== Biology ==
The flat tree oyster is a filter feeder, drawing water into its shell and passing it through its gills, extracting plankton and small organic particles in the process.

Breeding takes place after heavy rain has lowered the salinity of the water. Most of the adult oysters in the area take part in a mass spawning event when they all liberate their gametes at the same time. Fertilisation takes place in the water column and the larvae are planktonic. When they have passed through several developmental stages they settle to the seabed, undergo metamorphosis and attach themselves with byssus threads as miniature adults.
