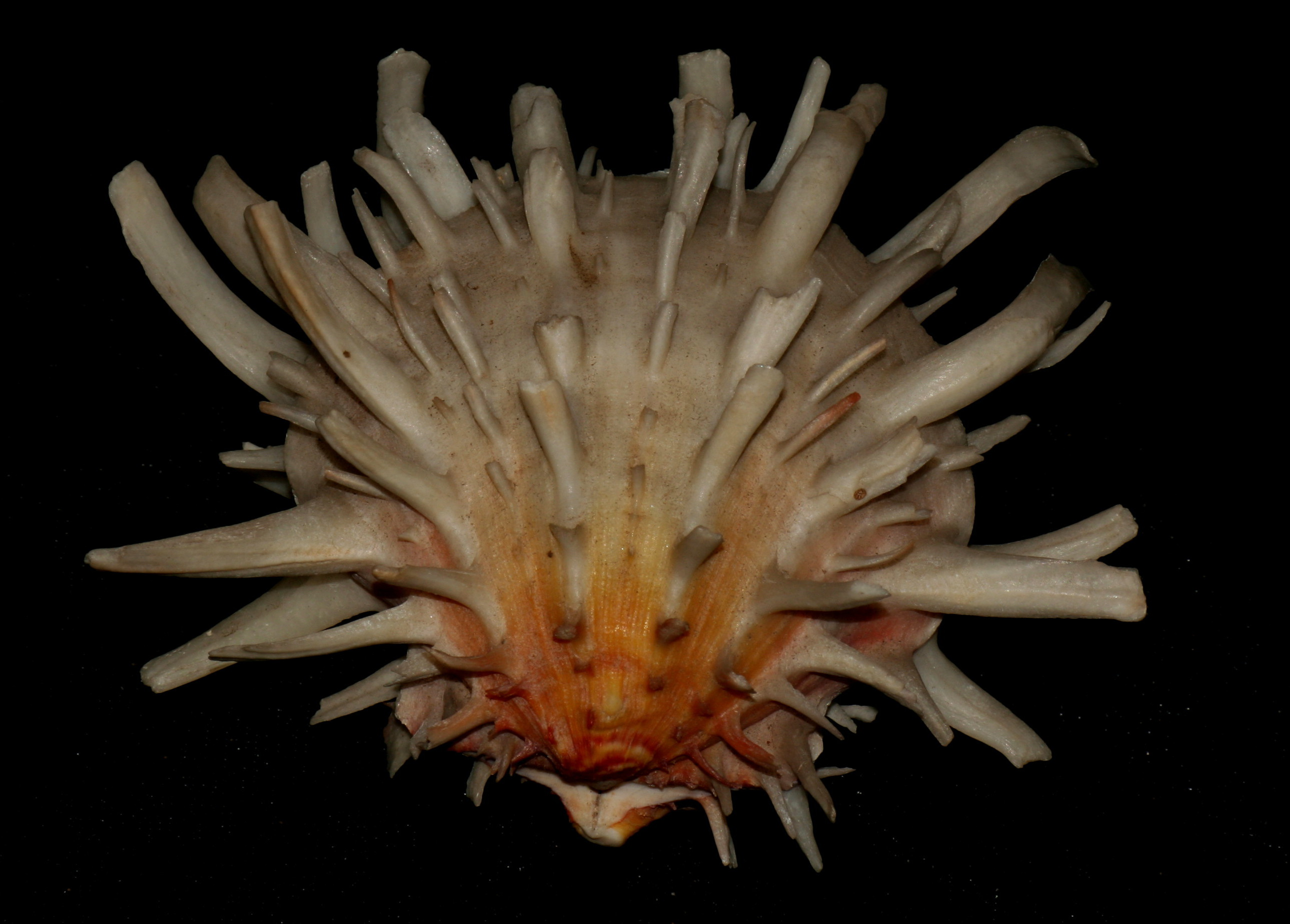
- Shell of Spondylus americanus Hermann, 1781

Scientific classification
- Kingdom: Animalia
- Phylum: Mollusca
- Class: Bivalvia
- Order: Pectinida
- Family: Spondylidae
- Genus: Spondylus
- Species: S. americanus

Binomial name
- Spondylus americanus Hermann, 1781

Synonyms
- Spondylus albus Schreibers, 1793; Spondylus arachnoides Lamarck, 1819; Spondylus avicularis Lamarck, 1819; Spondylus cuneus Reeve, 1856; Spondylus dominicensis Röding, 1798; Spondylus echinatus d'Orbigny in Sagra, 1853; Spondylus foliabrassicae d'Orbigny, 1853; Spondylus longispina Lamarck, 1819

= Spondylus americanus =

Species of bivalve

Spondylus americanus, the Atlantic thorny oyster, is a species of bivalve mollusc. It can be found along the Atlantic coast of North America, ranging from North Carolina to Brazil.

== Description ==
The Atlantic thorny oyster can grow up to 10 centimetres (3.9 in) in diameter. The valves of the shell are roughly circular and the upper one is decorated with many spiny protuberances up to 5 centimetres (2.0 in) long. When growing in a crevice, the shape of the shell adapts itself to the available space. The color varies but is usually white or cream with orange or purplish areas making it well camouflaged to hide from its predators. The lower valve is flat and is attached to the substrate. When the living animal is lying on the seabed it is usually not visible because of the algae, marine animals and sediment that cover the shell. The flat tree oyster and Lister's tree oyster are often among these epibionts. A diver swimming past may just observe a slight movement on the seabed as the oyster snaps its valves shut. Young animals are much less spiny than adults and resemble members of the genus Chama, the jewelbox clams.

== Distribution and habitat ==
The Atlantic thorny oyster occurs in the western Atlantic Ocean, the Caribbean Sea and Gulf of Mexico where it is found at depths between 9 and 45 metres (30 and 148 ft). Its range extends from North Carolina and Texas southwards to Venezuela and Brazil. It occurs on deep water reefs especially in areas with high sedimentation. It is often lodged in a crevice or concealed under an overhang. It is also a member of the fouling community, being found on sea walls, man made structures and wrecks.

== Biology ==
The Atlantic thorny oyster is a filter feeder sifting out plankton and other organic material from the water that passes over its gills. Little is known of its breeding habits but the larvae are planktonic, seeking out suitable locations on which to settle. Areas with suitable calcareous matter for building the shell are favoured. The adults are sedentary and normally occupy the same position for the rest of their lives unless shifted by storms.
