= Ivan Bartolomei =

Imperial Russian military officer, antiquarian and writer

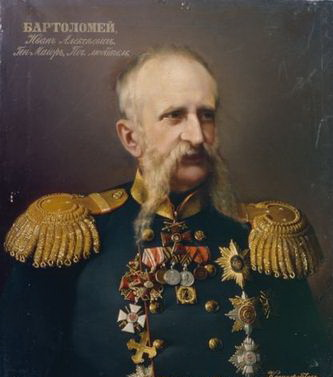
Ivan Bartolomei

Ivan Alekseyevich Bartolomei (Russian: Иван Алексеевич Бартоломей, 28 November 1813 – 5 October 1870) was an Imperial Russian military officer, antiquarian, and writer.

== Biography ==
Bartolomei was born in St. Petersburg in the family of a Russian army general, originally of the Livonian noble family of von Bartholomäi. He took part in the Caucasus War and the Crimean War. In 1853, he led a mission to bring the mountaineers of Free Svanetia under Russian suzerainty. He was promoted to lieutenant-general in 1865. Beyond his service as an Imperial general and bureaucrat, Bartolomei was interested in the peoples and cultures of the Caucasus. He collected Georgian, Bactrian, Parthian, and Sasanian coins, which he subsequently donated to the Hermitage Museum. He authored several studies on the Caucasian ethnography and linguistics and first attempts at creating Abkhaz and Chechen primers. He died in Tiflis in 1870.
