= Lamaria =

Georgian goddess

Lamaria (also Lamara or Lamia; Georgian: ლამარია) is a goddess in Georgian mythology, specifically of the Svan ethnic subgroup. Like many other deities of the Svan pantheon, her name is derived from a Christian figure; in her case, Mary, mother of Jesus. Lamaria is the goddess of the hearth, protector of cattle, and a protector of women – particularly during childbirth. She also ensured the fertility of a village's grain fields. She was also known as a patron of beekeeping, although that function was later assigned to the Svan interpretation of St. George.

Lamaria is generally categorized today as a goddess of female functions and spaces. She was venerated by women either inside their homes in the absence of men (the "interior of the interior"), or in small shrines in uninhabited spaces outside a village's boundaries (the "exterior of the exterior"). This was in contrast to religious rituals performed by men for male functions, which were either performed at public rituals inside the home, or within remote churches far up mountainsides (the "exterior of the interior" and the "interior of the exterior", respectively). Offerings made to Lamaria included cloth, jewelry, and beads. Sometimes, portable hearths were used for outdoor rituals involving Lamaria.

Lamaria was also sometimes associated with or considered equivalent to Barbol, another goddess of feminine and domestic functions. Some scholars have suggested that both originate from the same pre-Christian deity. The French scholar Georges Charachidzé believed Lamaria was derived from an Indo-European deity, possibly of the Ossetians or their ancestors, the Alans. He viewed Lamaria as a hearth goddess similar to the Roman goddess Vesta. In contrast, linguist and anthropologist Kevin Tuite viewed her as a multi-faceted figure displaying Vestal traits as well as associations with remote wilderness, like the Khevsurian goddess Samdzimari.

There was a festival in Lower Svaneti called the "tower feast" which involved Lamaria. The festival revolved around a snow tower built by participants. A sacred tree would be placed at the top of the tower, and a figurine of the goddess would be attached to the top of the tree. The figurine was given a dagger and a wooden phallus, and its face was covered. A round dance would be performed and the tree shaken until the figurine's face covering fell off. Then the village's children would race to climb the tower and make the Lamaria figurine fall to the ground. Tuite noted that the ritual had significant elements of liminality.

== See also ==
- Lamaria Church
