= Konstantine Dadeshkeliani =

Georgian prince (1826–1857)

Constantine Dadeshkeliani Prince of Svaneti
- კონსტანტინე ციოყის ძე დადიშქელიანი
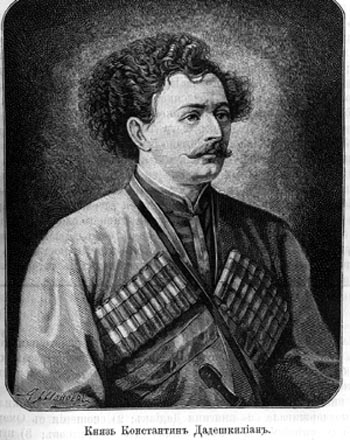
- Portrait of Dadeshkeliani.
- Born: 1826
- Died: 1857 (aged 30–31); Kutaisi
- Cause of death: Stabbing
- Occupation: Mtavari
- Years active: 1841-1857
- Known for: Last prince of Svaneti

Konstantine (Murzakan) Dadeshkeliani (Georgian: კონსტანტინე (მურზაყან) ციოყის ძე დადიშქელიანი; 1826–1857) was the last prince (mtavari) of the western Georgian mountainous region of Svaneti from 1841 to 1857.

The eldest son of Prince Mikheil (Tsiok) Dadeshkeliani, he succeeded on his father’s death in September 1841. He ruled under the regency of his grandmother Digorkhan, who died in an armed conflict between the two branches of Dadeshkeliani of Svaneti in 1843.

Konstantine assumed full ruling powers in 1846. He remained a nominal vassal of the Russian Empire, but was effectively independent. Continuing dynastic strife among the Dadishkeliani, their defiance to the Russian government, and vacillation during the Crimean War (1854–1856), however, led to direct Russian intervention. In 1857, Prince Alexander Baryatinsky, Viceroy of the Caucasus, ordered Svaneti to be subdued by armed force. Konstantine chose to negotiate, but was deposed on September 11, 1857, and ordered into exile to Erivan. On a farewell audience in Kutaisi on October 27, 1857, he quarreled with a local Russian administrator, Alexander Gagarin, and stabbed to death him and two of his staff. When captured, Konstantine was summarily tried by court martial and shot on.
