= Alexander Gagarin =

Russian general

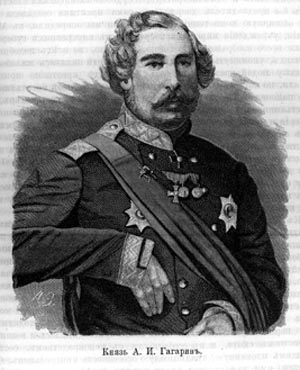
Prince A. I. Gagarin

Prince Alexander Ivanovich Gagarin (Russian: Алекса́ндр Ива́нович Гага́рин) (1801 – 27 October 1857) was a Russian general and nobleman of Rurikid ancestry who was involved in the Caucasian and Crimean wars. In 1857, he served as a governor-general of Kutaisi and was killed by Constantine Dadeshkeliani, the deposed Prince of Svanetia, during a quarrel at Kutaisi.
