= House of Dadeshkeliani =

Dadeshkeliani დადეშქელიანი
- Nobility
- Parent house: House of Gelovani
- Country: Georgia
- Titles: Principality of Svaneti

The House of Dadeshkeliani or Dadishkeliani (Georgian: დადეშქელიანი, დადიშქელიანი) was an aristocratic family from the mountainous western Georgian province of Svaneti. They ruled the Principality of Svaneti from the 1720s to 1857.

== History ==
Although the Dadeshkeliani themselves claimed the descent from the Shamkhal dynasty of Tarki, in Dagestan, historic evidence shows that they were spun off from the House of Gelovani, a princely dynasty of Svaneti known since the 11th century.

One princess of the Gelovani family is said to have survived the destruction of her clan by the princes Dadiani, who usurped the Principality of Svaneti in the mid-17th century, and to have fled to Kabarda in the North Caucasus. Her eldest son, called Dadesh, married into a local princely family and his name was later transformed into a separate family name locally pronounced as Dadeshkeliani. His descendants were able to return to Svaneti to reclaim the domain from the Dadiani, attaining to the principate of Svaneti in the 1720s for the second time.

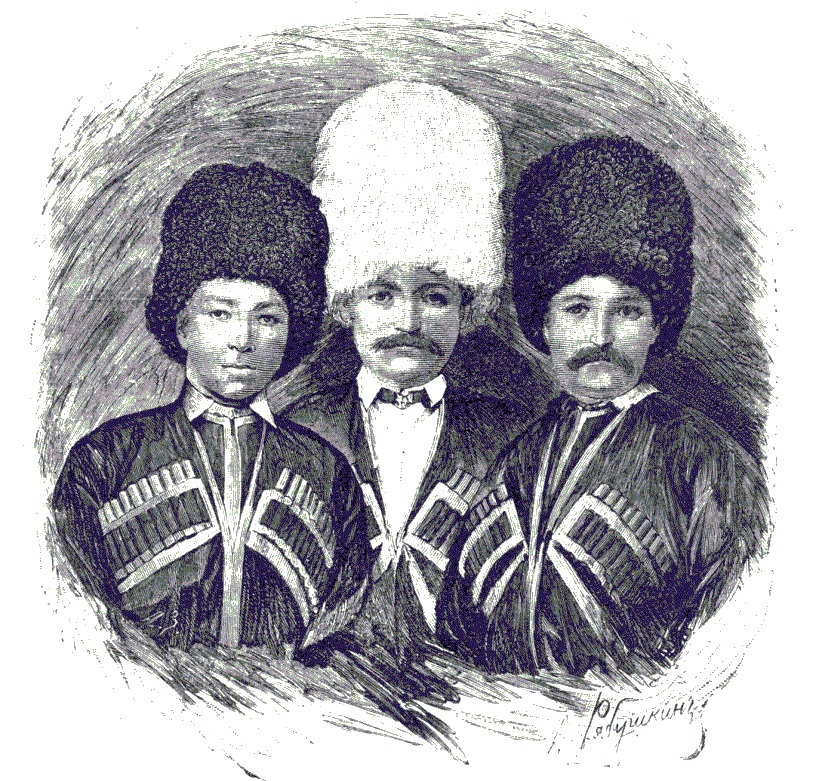
Brothers of Constantine Dadeshkeliani: Tsiokh (Mikhail), Tengis (Nicholas), and Isami (1850s).

Since then, the Gelovani ruled the Lower Svaneti, whilst the Dadeshkelian - the Upper Svaneti. In the 1820s, the Principality of Svaneti effectively split into two as a result of a blood feud between the rival Dadeshkeliani branches. Through the mediation by the princes of Mingrelia, both branches accepted nominal Russian suzerainty in 1833. Nevertheless, they continued to run their affairs independently and did not allow Russian officials or church missions into the area until the late 1840s.

Continuing dynastic strife among the Dadishkeliani, their defiance to the Russian government, and vacillation during the Crimean War (1854–1856), however, led to direct Russian intervention. In 1857, Prince Alexander Baryatinsky, Viceroy of the Caucasus, ordered Svaneti to be subdued by armed force. The prince of Svaneti, Constantine, chose to negotiate, but was ordered into exile to Erivan. On a farewell audience in Kutaisi, he quarreled with a local Russian administrator, Alexander Gagarin, and stabbed to death him and three of his staff. When captured, Constantine was summarily tried by court martial and shot. In 1858, the principality was abolished and converted into a district administered by a Russian-appointed officer (pristav). Several members of the family were exiled to the remote Russian provinces and those who remained in Georgia were deprived of their privileges of autonomous princes.

== Notable members ==
- Nino Dadeshkeliani, Georgian author
