= Free Svaneti =

Autonomous region

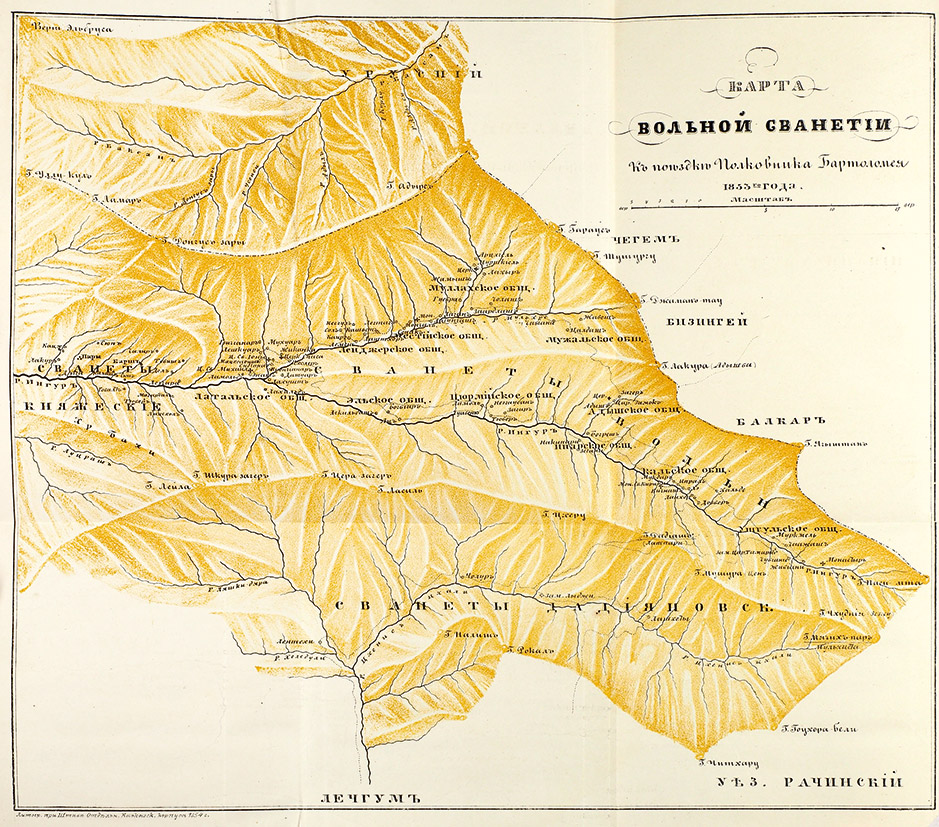
Map of Free Svaneti in 1855.

Free Svaneti (Georgian: თავისუფალი სვანეთი, t'avisup'ali svanet'i; Russian: Вольная Сванетия, vol'naya svanetiya) was a name applied to the self-governing communities of Svan highlanders, originally coined by the Imperial Russian officials and explorers of the Caucasus. These communities formed a loose confederation with a clan-based traditional system of law. As a quasi-autonomous region, Free Svaneti probably emerged with the decline of Georgian feudalism in the 15th century and was devoid of any centralized government until being subjected to the Russian Empire in 1853. The last vestiges of the Svan self-rule was brought to an end by the Russian military in 1876.

== Society ==
The Free Svan communities occupied eastern part of Upper Svaneti, the so-called Upper Bal region, along the upper Enguri River, and comprised the Latali, Lenjeri, Mulakhi, Mulazhi, Ieli, Tsvirmi, Ipari, Adishi, Kala, and Ushguli village communes, with a population of around 5,200. In contrast to other parts of early modern Svaneti, these communities were not subject to the princely dynasties of the Dadishkeliani of Svaneti and the Dadiani of Mingrelia, which had emerged following the dissolution of the Kingdom of Georgia in the late 15th century. The Free Svan society was devoid of typical feudalism, with no single family rising to prominence, although the distinction between nobles (warg, aznauri) and peasants retained considerable significance in social and economic life. The noble families of note were Charkviani, Kipiani, Goshteliani, Japaridze, Ioseliani, Kurdiani, Zhorzholiani, and Devdariani.

Each of the Free Svan communities enjoyed self-rule. Common matters were discussed at popular councils, attended by both men and women above 20; the elders from different communities at times convened at Ushguli. This alliance between the Svan clans was based on common interests in joint self-defence, in protecting common property such as pastures and churches, and in safeguarding social order based on the traditional law. The alliance was cemented by an oath of unity which was renewed every three years and was to be taken "on an icon", that is, in the presence of the sacred image of a Christian saint.

== History ==
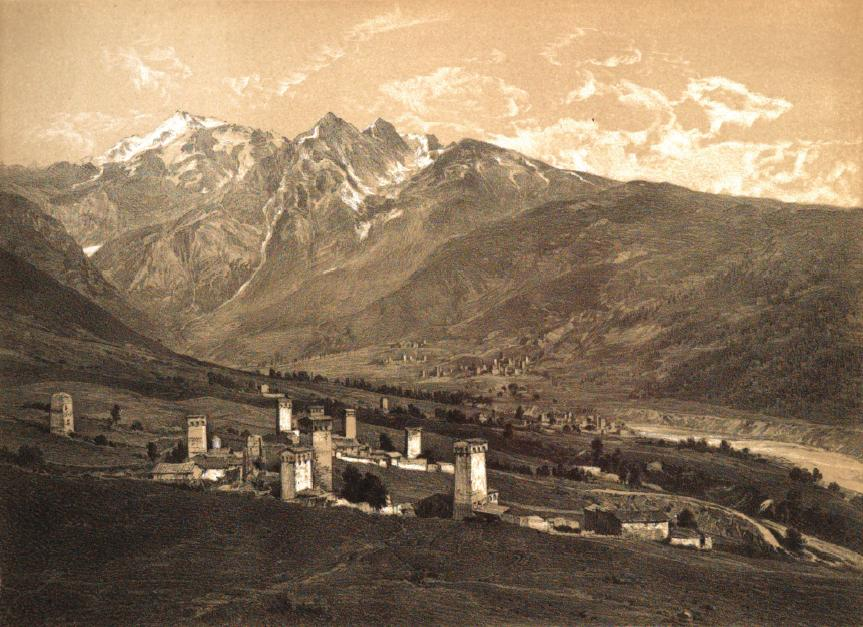
The villages of Mulakhi and Muzhali dotted with traditional towers c. 1875.

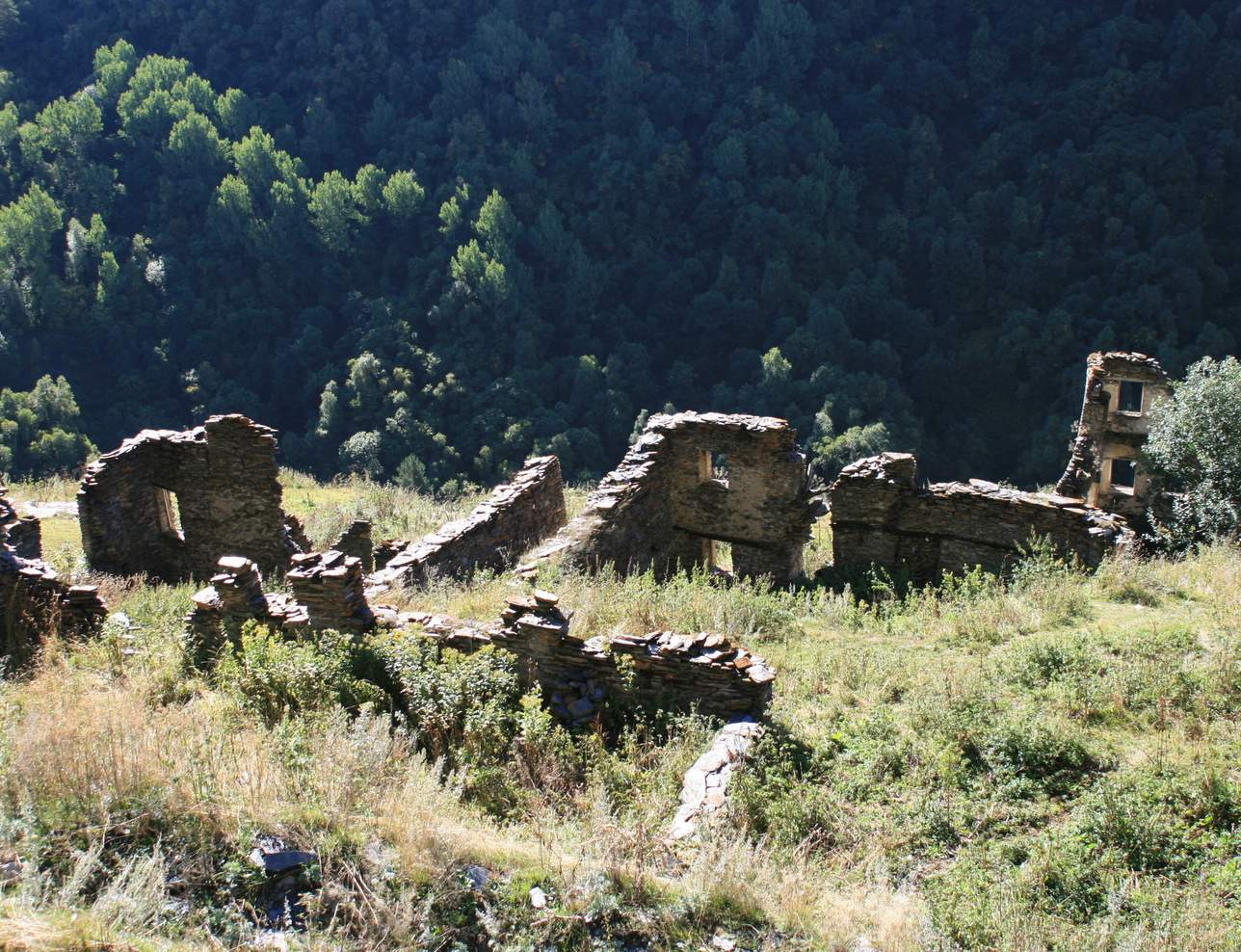
Ruins of Khalde photographed in 2011.

From the early 1830s the Free Svan clans sought Russian protection against the Dadishkeliani, but refused to admit officials and priests sent to them. In the early 1840s, the Russian government of the Caucasus dispatched Nikoloz Kutateladze, a Georgian priest from Kutaisi, on a mission to revive Christian church among the Free Svans, who then practiced a mixture of Georgian Orthodox Christianity and pagan beliefs, with no organized church structure. The priest quickly garnered much respect and was able to convince the highlanders to apply for Russian protection. In 1847, most of the Free Svan communities, with the exception of those of Latali and Lenjeri, accepted the Russian authority and were organized into the Malakho-Iparsky circuit administered by a bailiff (pristav). The Svans proved to be unruly, however, and two years later, in February 1849, the bailiff Prince Aleksandr Mikeladze was forced into flight to Mingrelia. The Free Svans were, consequently, delisted as Russian subjects until they renewed their quest for imperial protection and allowed Mikeladze to come back in 1853.

On his return to Svaneti, Mikeladze was accompanied by Colonel Ivan Bartolomei, a history enthusiast, who left one of the first accounts of medieval Georgian and Byzantine antiquities safeguarded in the old churches of Free Svaneti. There was no Russian military presence in Free Svaneti until the 1870s. In 1875 the Svans resisted the government's survey of peasant-owned land and livestock for taxation purposes. As a result, General Tsytovich's force was deployed. A Russian detachment attacked the rebel stronghold of Khalde and was routed. A larger force, supported by artillery, took the village by storm on 27 August 1876. Khalde's 19 defense towers were destroyed, while the captives were exiled to Siberia. Thereafter, the Russians rule was tightened, with appointed headmen. Free Svaneti was no more a distinct entity, but the term survived in ethnographic literature.
