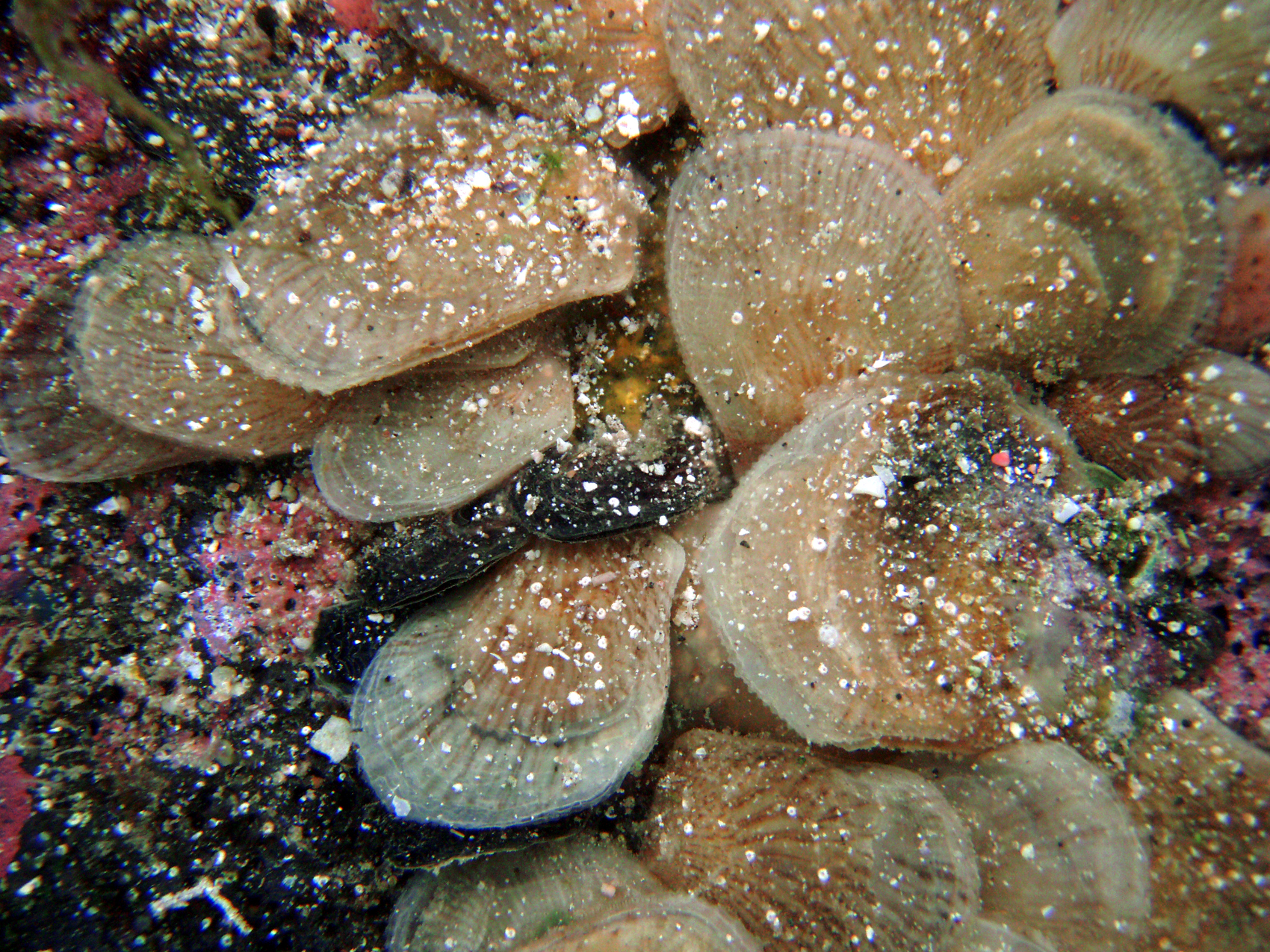
- Live Isognomon sp. under a rock in Kona District, Hawaii

Scientific classification
- Domain: Eukaryota
- Kingdom: Animalia
- Phylum: Mollusca
- Class: Bivalvia
- Order: Pteriida
- Family: Isognomonidae
- Genus: Isognomon; Lightfoot, 1786

Type species
- Ostrea perna Linnaeus, 1767

Species
- See text

Synonyms
- Isognoma Lightfoot, 1786 (Isognoma is an alternative original spelling for Isognomon); Isognomon (Anisoperna) Iredale, 1939; Isognomon (Isognomon) Lightfoot, 1786; Isognomon (Melina) Philipsson, 1788; Isogonum Röding, 1798; Malleoperna Iredale, 1939; Melina Philipsson, 1788; Parviperna Iredale, 1939; Pedalion Dillwyn, 1817; Perna Bruguière, 1789; Pernaria Rafinesque, 1815; Sutura Megerle von Mühlfeld, 1811

= Isognomon =

Isognomon Temporal range: Permian - Recent

Genus of bivalves

(For the tree oyster mushroom, see Pleurotus ostreatus.)

Isognomon is a genus of marine bivalve mollusks which is related to the pearl oysters.

Isognomon is known in the fossil record from the Permian period to the Quaternary period (age range: 254.0 to 0.012 million years ago). Fossils of species within this genus have been found all over the world.

== Taxonomy ==
This genus is placed in the family Isognomonidae. However previous molecular phylogeny studies have shown that these tree oysters belong in the family Pteriidae.

== Description ==
These oysters grow to be about 4.75 inches (12.1 cm) in overall length, producing a highly irregular shell with a blue-gray and often heavily encrusted exterior but a smooth and pearly white interior. They use their byssus to completely immobilize themselves to the roots of mangrove trees, corals, and other substrates. It is because of the preference for mangroves that these are sometimes called tree oysters

== Species ==
- Isognomon alatus (Gmelin, 1791) — Flat tree-oyster
- Isognomon albisoror (Iredale, 1939)
- Isognomon australica (Reeve, 1858)
- Isognomon bicolor (C.B. Adams, 1845)
- Isognomon californicus (Conrad, 1837)
- Isognomon dunkeri (P. Fischer, 1881)
- Isognomon ephippium (Linnaeus, 1758)
- † Isognomon fortissimus (L. C. King, 1933)
- Isognomon incisum (Conrad, 1837)
- Isognomon isognomum (Linnaeus, 1758)
- Isognomon janus Carpenter, 1857
- Isognomon legumen (Gmelin, 1791)
- Isognomon nucleus (Lamarck, 1819)
- Isognomon perna (Linnaeus, 1767)
- Isognomon radiatus (Anton, 1838) — Lister's tree oyster
- Isognomon recognitus (Mabille, 1895)
- Isognomon vulselloides Macsotay & Campos, 2001

== Extinct species ==
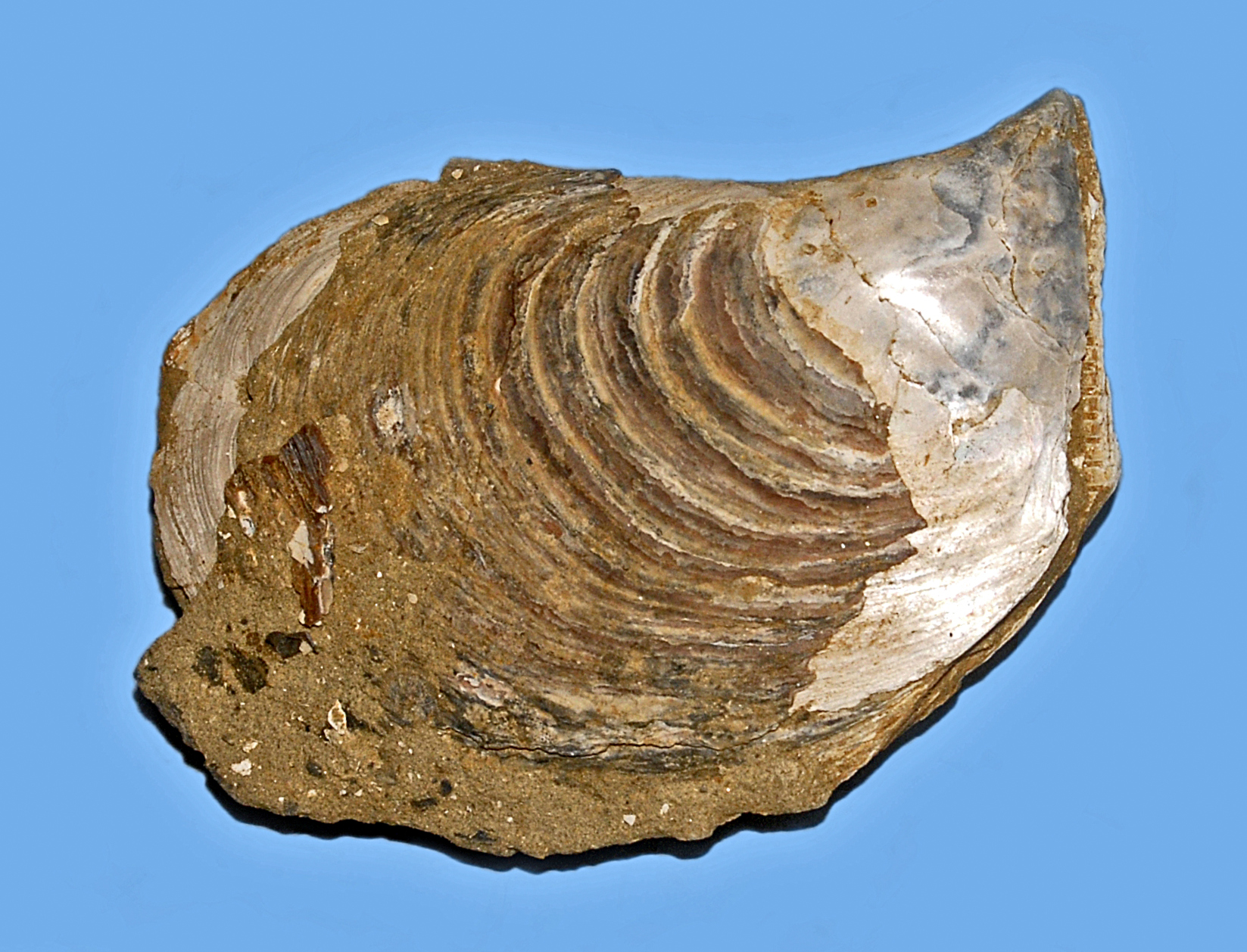
Fossil of Isognomon maxillatus from Pliocene of Italy

Extinct species within this genus include:

- †Isognomon gariesensis Kensley and Pether 1986
- †Isognomon gaudichaudi d'Orbigny 1842
- †Isognomon isognomoides Stahl 1824
- †Isognomon isognomon Linnaeus 1758
- †Isognomon isognomonoides Stahl 1824
- †Isognomon legumen Gmelin 1790
- †Isognomon maxillatus Lamarck 1819
- †Isognomon nucleus Lamarck 1819
- †Isognomon quadrisulcata Ihering 1897
- †Isognomon valvanoi Rossi de Garcia and Levy 1977
- † Isognomon wellmani Crampton, 1988

Species brought into synonymy

- Isognomon acutirostris (Dunker, 1869): synonym of Isognomon nucleus (Lamarck, 1819)
- Isognomon anomioides (Reeve, 1858): synonym of Isognomon australica (Reeve, 1858)
- Isognomon aviculare (Lamarck, 1819): synonym of Isognomon isognomum (Linnaeus, 1758)
- Isognomon brevirostre Link, 1807: synonym of Isognomon isognomum (Linnaeus, 1758)
- Isognomon dentifer (Krauss, 1848): synonym of Isognomon nucleus (Lamarck, 1819)
- Isognomon isognomon (Linnaeus, 1758): synonym of Isognomon isognomum (Linnaeus, 1758)
- Isognomon roberti Koch, 1953: synonym of Isognomon perna (Linnaeus, 1767)
- Isognomon rude (Reeve, 1858): synonym of Isognomon isognomum (Linnaeus, 1758)
- Isognomon rupella (Dufo, 1840): synonym of Isognomon nucleus (Lamarck, 1819)
- Isognomon sulcatum Lamarck: synonym of Isognomon perna (Linnaeus, 1767)
- Isognomon vulsella (Lamarck, 1819): synonym of Isognomon legumen (Gmelin, 1791)
