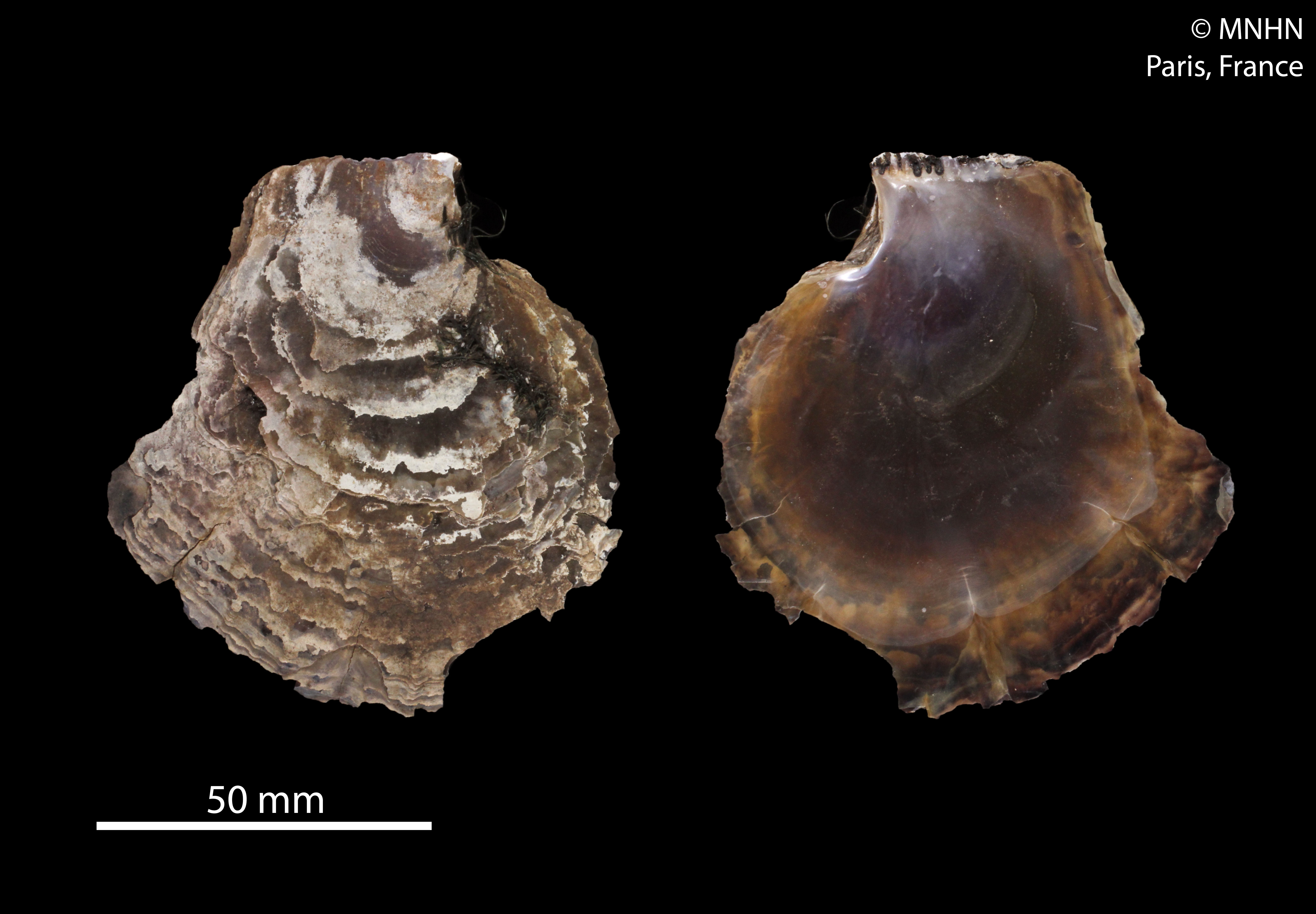
- Shell of Isognomon ephippium (specimen at MNHN, Paris)

Scientific classification
- Kingdom: Animalia
- Phylum: Mollusca
- Class: Bivalvia
- Order: Pteriida
- Superfamily: Pterioidea
- Family: Isognomonidae; Woodring, 1925 (1828)

Genera
- See text

Synonyms
- Melinidae Meek & Hayden, 1865; Pernidae J. Fleming, 1828

= Isognomonidae =

Family of molluscs

Isognomonidae is a family of medium-sized to large salt-water clams. They are pearl oysters, marine bivalve molluscs in the superfamily Pterioidea.

== Genera ==
- Isognomon [Lightfoot], 1786 - tree oysters

== Bibliography ==
- Bouchet P. & Rocroi J.P. (2010). Nomenclator of bivalve families; with a classification of bivalve families by R. Bieler, J.G. Carter & E.V. Coan. Malacologia. 52(2): 1-184
- Huber M. (2015). Compendium of Bivalves 2. Harxheim: ConchBooks. 907 pp.
- Coan, E. V.; Valentich-Scott, P. (2012). Bivalve seashells of tropical West America. Marine bivalve mollusks from Baja California to northern Peru. 2 vols, 1258 p.
