= Saint George and the Dragon =

Medieval legend

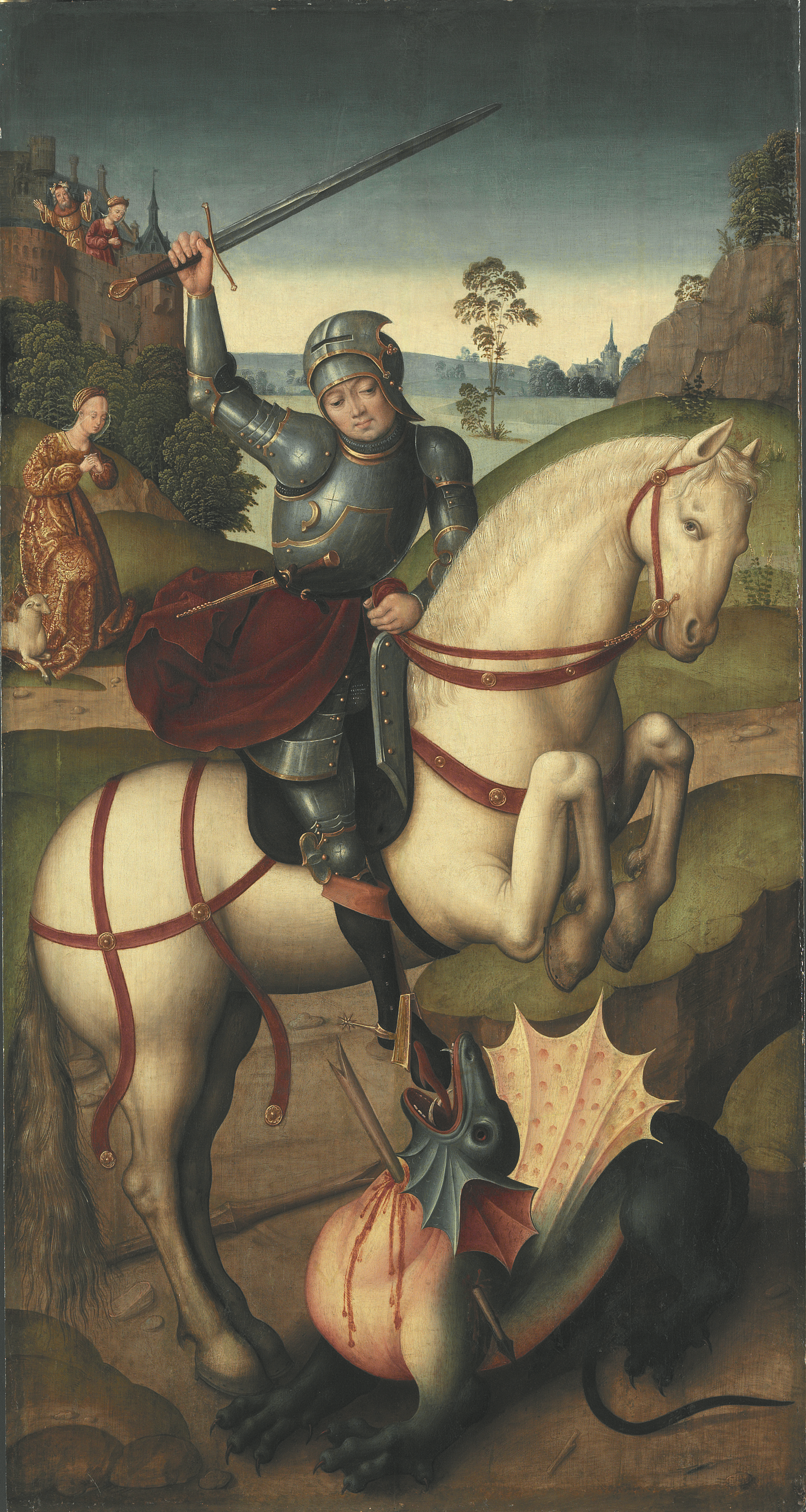
St Catherine / St George and the Dragon, by the Master of Kappenberg (1465–1535)

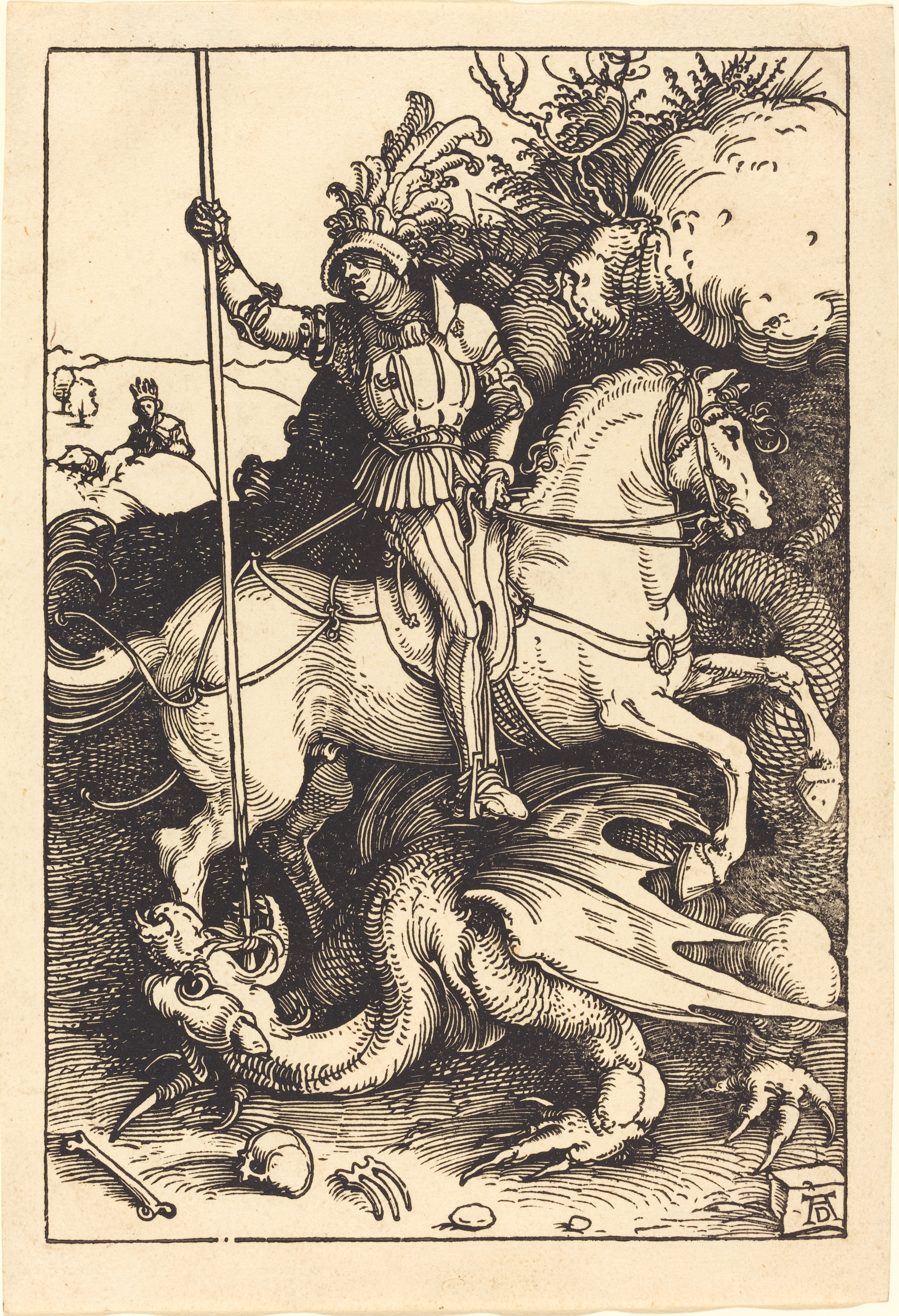
Saint George Killing the Dragon, woodcut by Albrecht Dürer (1501/4)

Saint George and the Dragon is a legend in which Saint George—a soldier venerated in Christianity and among the Druze—defeats a dragon. The story goes that the dragon originally extorted tribute from villagers. When they ran out of livestock and trinkets for the dragon, they started giving up a human tribute of two children per day, selected by lot. One day, the princess herself was selected as the next offering. As she was walking toward the dragon's cave, St. George saw her and asked why she was crying. The princess told the saint about the dragon's atrocities and asked him to flee immediately, in fear that he might be killed too. But the saint refused to flee, slew the dragon, and rescued the princess. The narrative was first set in Cappadocia in the earliest sources of the 11th and 12th centuries, but transferred to Libya in the 13th-century Golden Legend.

The narrative has pre-Christian origins (Jason and Medea, Perseus and Andromeda, Typhon, etc.), and is recorded in various saints' lives prior to its attribution to Saint George specifically. It was particularly attributed to Saint Theodore Tiro in the 9th and 10th centuries, and was first transferred to Saint George in the 11th century. The oldest known record of Saint George slaying a dragon is found in a Georgian text of the 11th century.

The legend and iconography spread rapidly through the Byzantine cultural sphere in the 12th century. It reached Western Christian tradition still in the 12th century, via the Crusades. The knights of the First Crusade believed that Saint George, along with his fellow soldier-saints Demetrius, Maurice, Theodore and Mercurius, had fought alongside them at Antioch and Jerusalem. The legend was popularised in Western tradition in the 13th century based on its Latin versions in the Speculum Historiale and the Golden Legend. At first limited to the courtly setting of chivalric romance, the legend was popularised in the 13th century and became a favourite literary and pictorial subject in the Late Middle Ages and Renaissance, and it has become an integral part of the Christian traditions relating to Saint George in both Eastern and Western tradition.

== Origins ==
=== Pre-Christian predecessors ===
The iconography of military saints Theodore, George and Demetrius as horsemen is a direct continuation of the Roman-era "Thracian horseman" type iconography. The iconography of the dragon appears to grow out of the serpent entwining the "tree of life" on one hand, and with the draco standard used by late Roman cavalry on the other. Horsemen spearing serpents and boars are widely represented in Roman-era stelae commemorating cavalry soldiers. A carving from Krupac, Serbia, depicts Apollo and Asclepius as Thracian horsemen, shown besides the serpent entwined around the tree. Another stele shows the Dioscuri as Thracian horsemen on either side of the serpent-entwined tree, killing a boar with their spears.

The development of the hagiographical narrative of the dragon-fight parallels the development of iconography. It draws from pre-Christian dragon myths. The Coptic version of the Saint George legend, edited by E. A. Wallis Budge in 1888, and estimated by Budge to be based on a source of the 5th or 6th century, names "governor Dadianus", the persecutor of Saint George as "the dragon of the abyss", a Greek myth with similar elements of the legend is the battle between Bellerophon and the Chimera. Budge makes explicit the parallel to pre-Christian myth:

I doubt much of the whole story of Saint George is anything more than one of the many versions of the old-world story of the conflict between Light and Darkness, or Ra and Apepi, and Marduk and Tiamat, woven upon a few slender threads of historical fact. Tiamat, the scaly, winged, foul dragon, and Apepi the powerful enemy of the glorious Sungod, were both destroyed and made to perish in the fire which he sent against them and their fiends: and Dadianus, also called the 'dragon', with his friends the sixty-nine governors, was also destroyed by fire called down from heaven by the prayer of Saint George.

In anticipation of the Saint George iconography, first noted in the 1870s, a Coptic stone fenestrella shows a mounted hawk-headed figure fighting a crocodile, interpreted by the Louvre as Horus killing a metamorphosed Setekh.

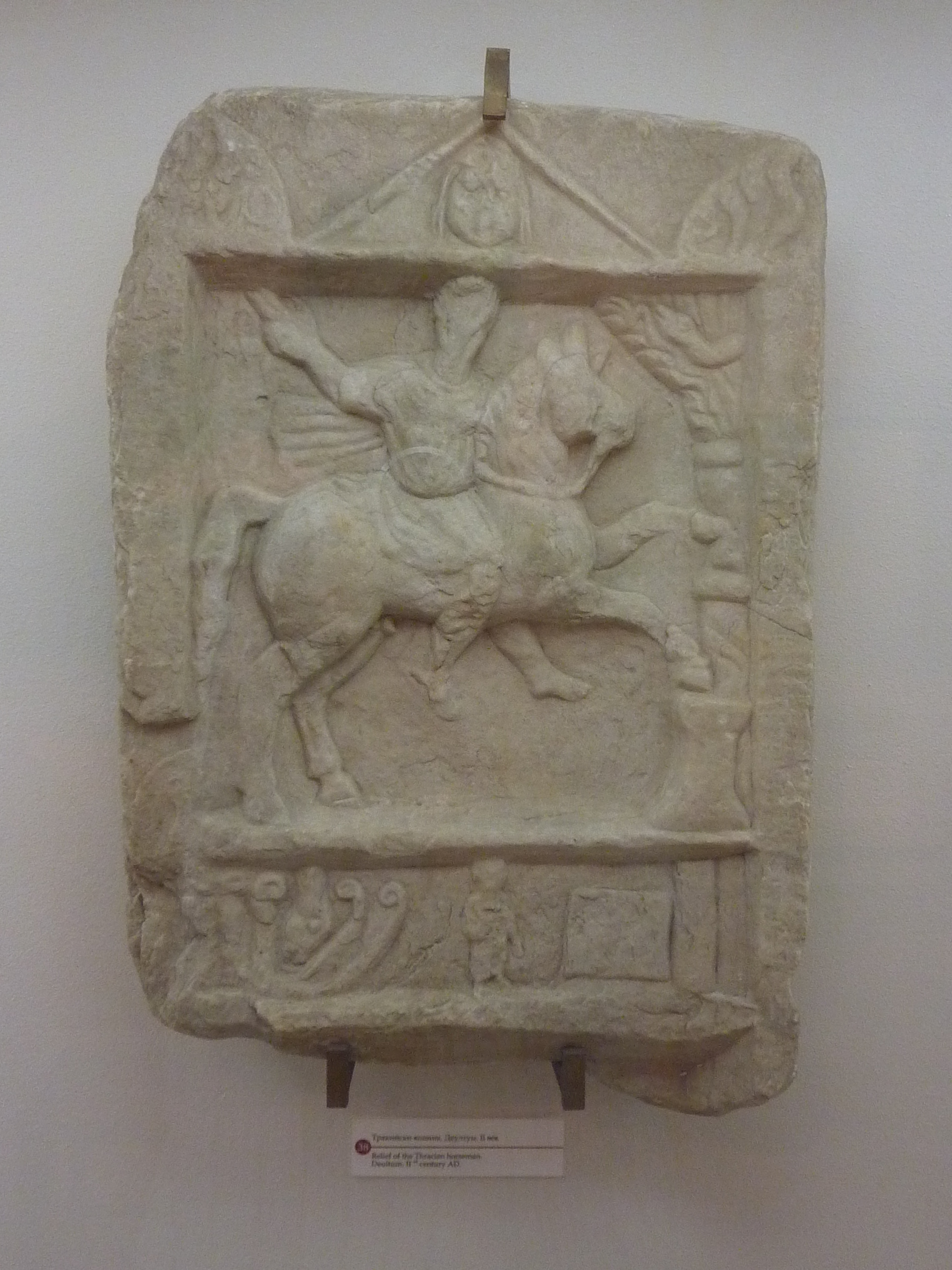
Thracian horseman with serpent-entwined tree (2nd century)

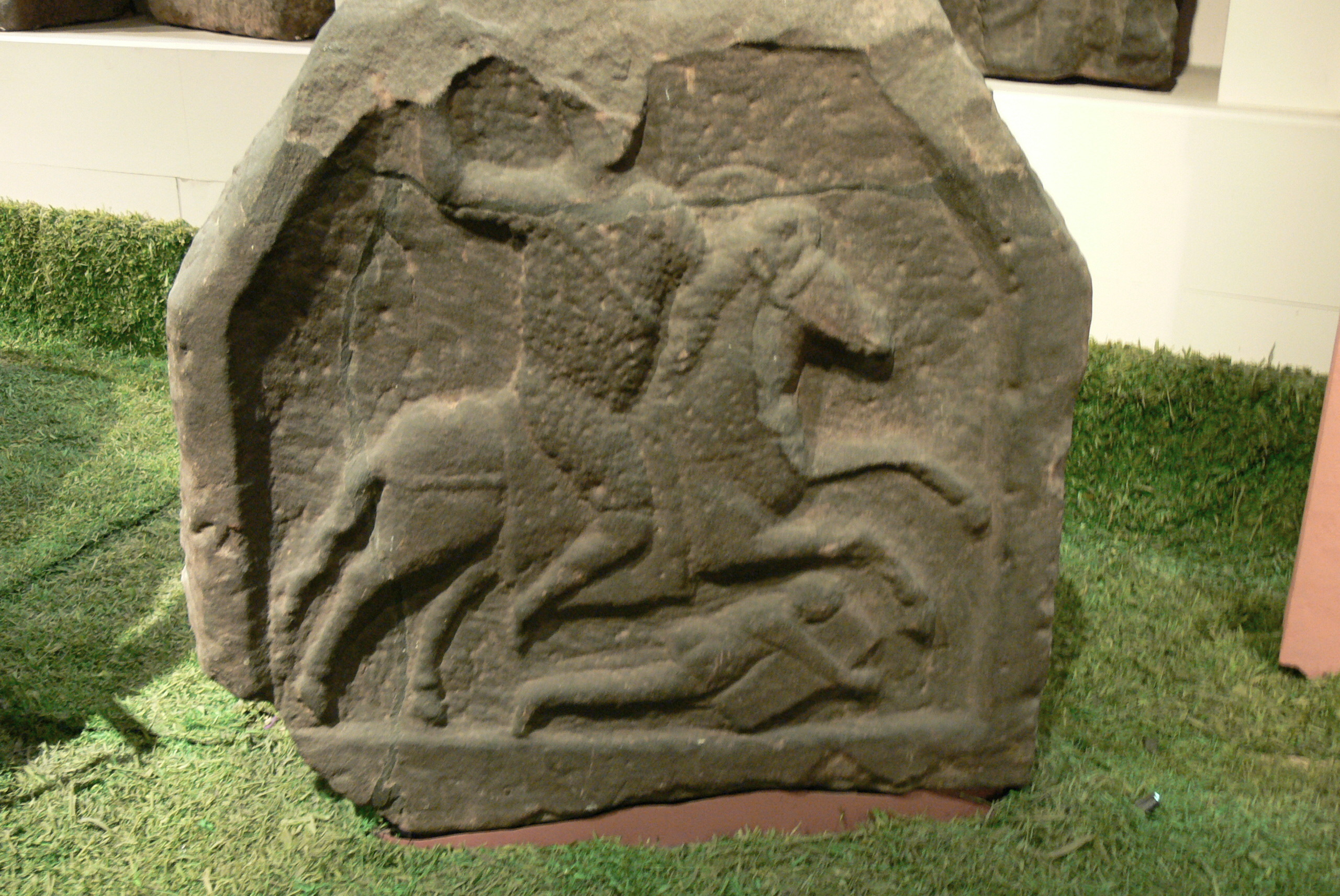
Funerary relief of a Roman cavalryman trampling a barbarian warrior (4th or 5th century).
Grosvenor Museum, Chester

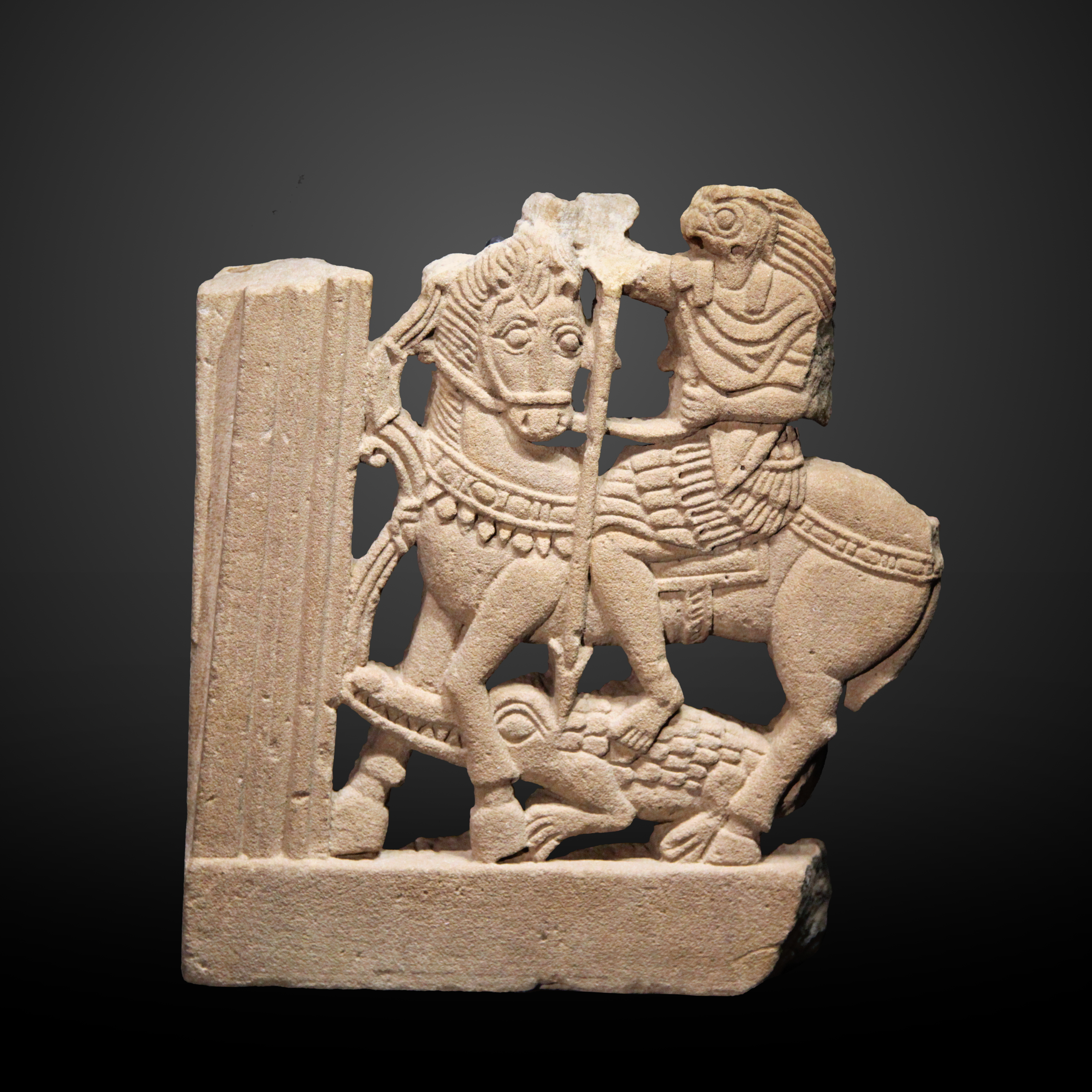
Fenestrella interpreted by the Louvre as Horus on horseback spearing Set in the shape of a crocodile (4th century)

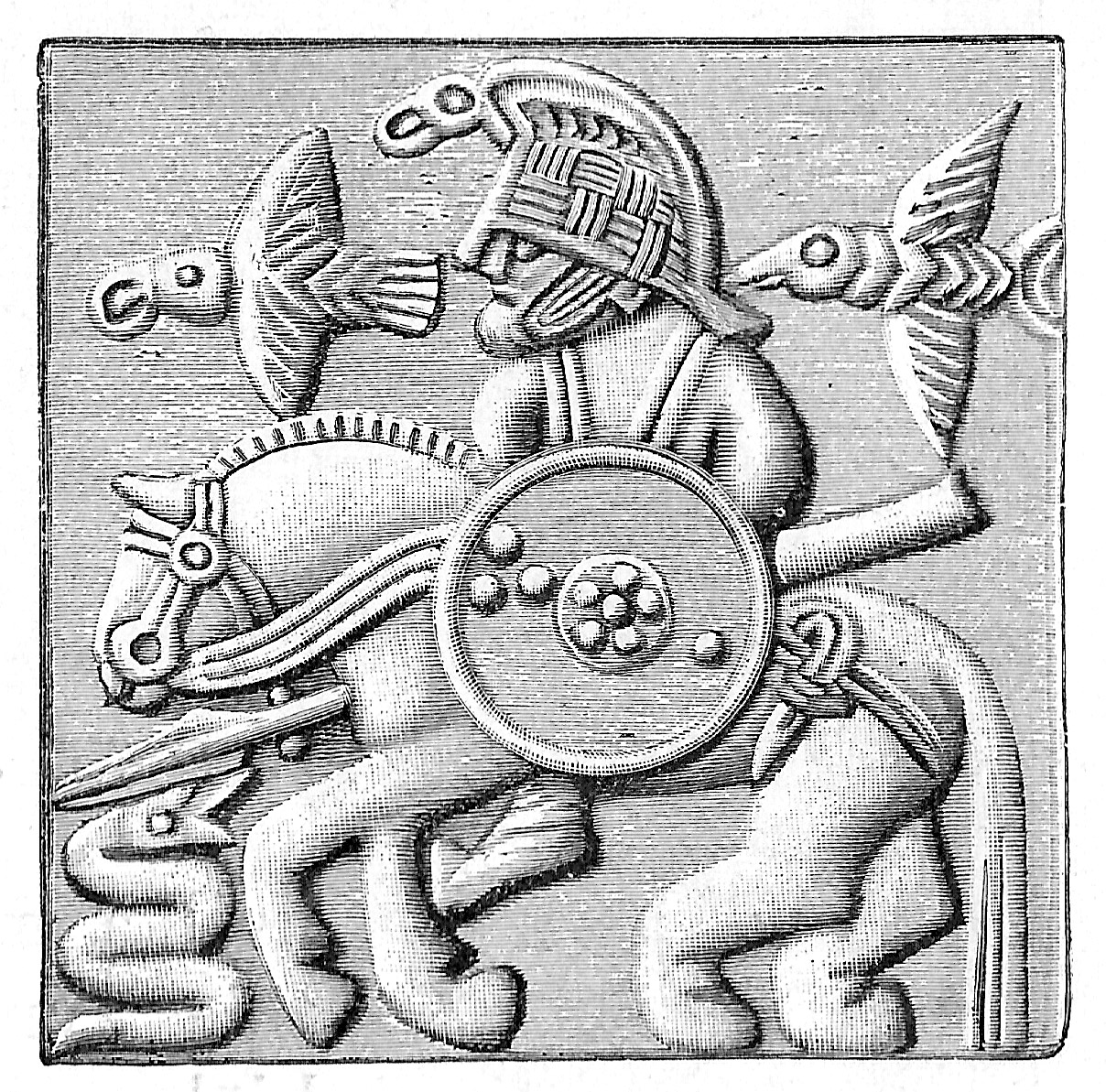
Swedish Vendel Period helmet plate depicting what is assumed to be Odin on horseback running over a serpent

=== Christianised iconography ===
Depictions of "Christ militant" trampling a serpent are found in Christian art of the late 5th century. Iconography of the horseman with spear overcoming evil becomes current in the early medieval period. Iconographic representations of St Theodore as dragon-slayer are dated to as early as the 7th century, certainly by the early 10th century (the oldest certain depiction of Theodore killing a dragon is at Aghtamar, dated c. 920). Theodore is reported as having destroyed a dragon near Euchaita in a legend not younger than the late 9th century. Early depictions of a horseman killing a dragon are unlikely to represent Saint George, who in the 10th century was depicted as killing a human figure, not a dragon.

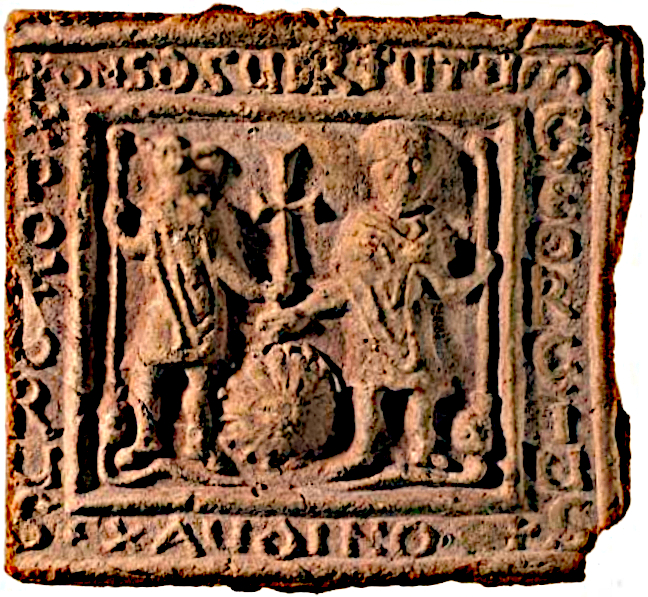
Vinica ceramic icon of Saints Christopher and George as dragon-slayers

The earliest image of St Theodore as a horseman (named in Latin) is from Vinica, North Macedonia, and, if genuine, dates to the 6th or 7th century. Here, Theodore is not slaying a dragon, but holding a draco standard. One of the Vinica icons also has the oldest representation of Saint George with a dragon: George stands besides a cynocephalous Saint Christopher, both saints treading on snakes with human heads, and aiming at their heads with spears. Maguire (1996) has connected the shift from unnamed equestrian heroes used in household magic to the more regulated iconography of named saints to the closer regulation of sacred imagery following the iconoclasm of the 730s.

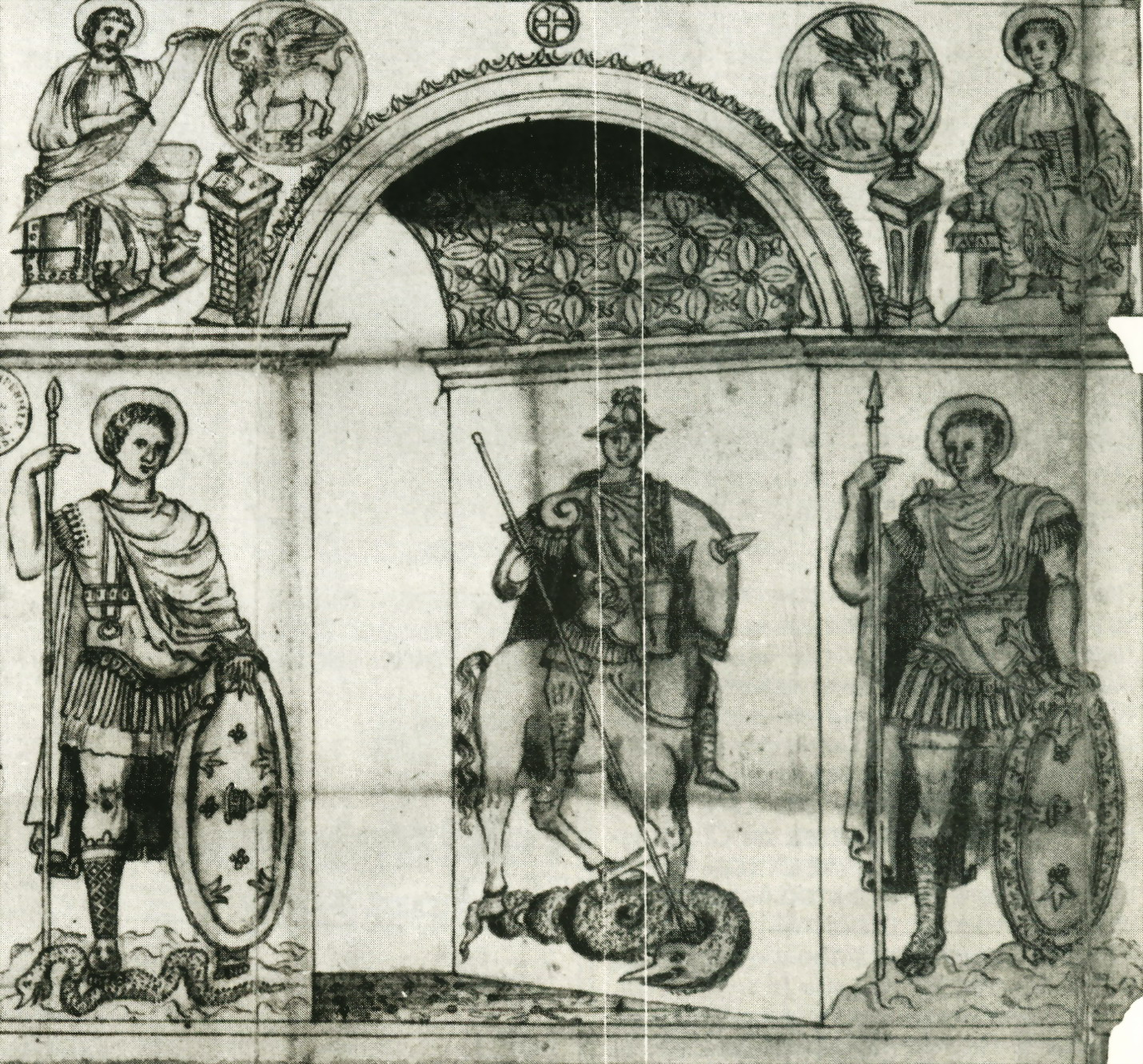
17th-century drawing of the Arcus Einhardi

In the West, a Carolingian-era depiction of a Roman horseman trampling and piercing a dragon between two soldier saints with lances and shields was put on the foot of a crux gemmata, formerly in the Treasury of the Basilica of Saint Servatius in Maastricht (lost since the 18th c.). The representation survives in a 17th-century drawing, now in the Bibliothèque Nationale de France in Paris.

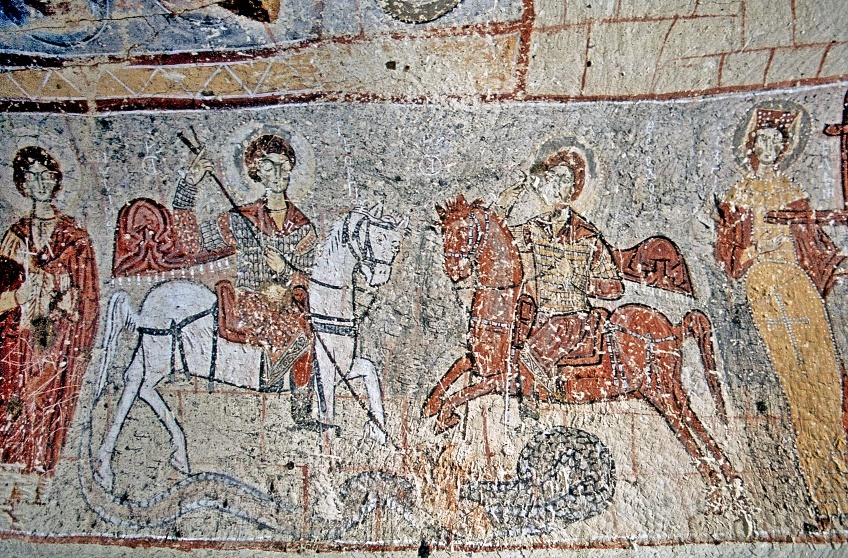
The Yılanlı Kilise fresco of saints Theodore and George slaying the dragon

The "Christianisation" of the Thracian horseman iconography can be traced to the Cappadocian cave churches of Göreme, where frescoes of the 10th century show military saints on horseback confronting serpents with one, two or three heads. One of the earliest examples is from the church known as Mavrucan 3 (Güzelöz, Yeşilhisar), generally dated to the 10th century, which portrays two "sacred riders" confronting two serpents twined around a tree, in a striking parallel to the Dioskuroi stela, except that the riders are now attacking the snake in the "tree of life" instead of a boar. In this example, at least, there appear to be two snakes with separate heads, but other examples of 10th-century Cappadocia show polycephalous snakes.

A poorly preserved wall-painting at the Yılanlı Kilise ("Snake Church") that depicts the two saints Theodore and George attacking a dragon has been tentatively dated to the 10th century, or alternatively even to the mid-9th.

A similar example, but showing three equestrian saints, Demetrius, Theodore and George, is from the "Zoodochos Pigi" chapel in central Macedonia in Greece, in the prefecture of Kilkis, near the modern village of Kolchida, dated to the 9th or 10th century.

A 12th-century depiction of the mounted dragon-slayer, presumably depicting Theodore, not George, is found in four muqarna panels in the nave of the Cappella Palatina in Palermo.

=== Transfer to Saint George ===
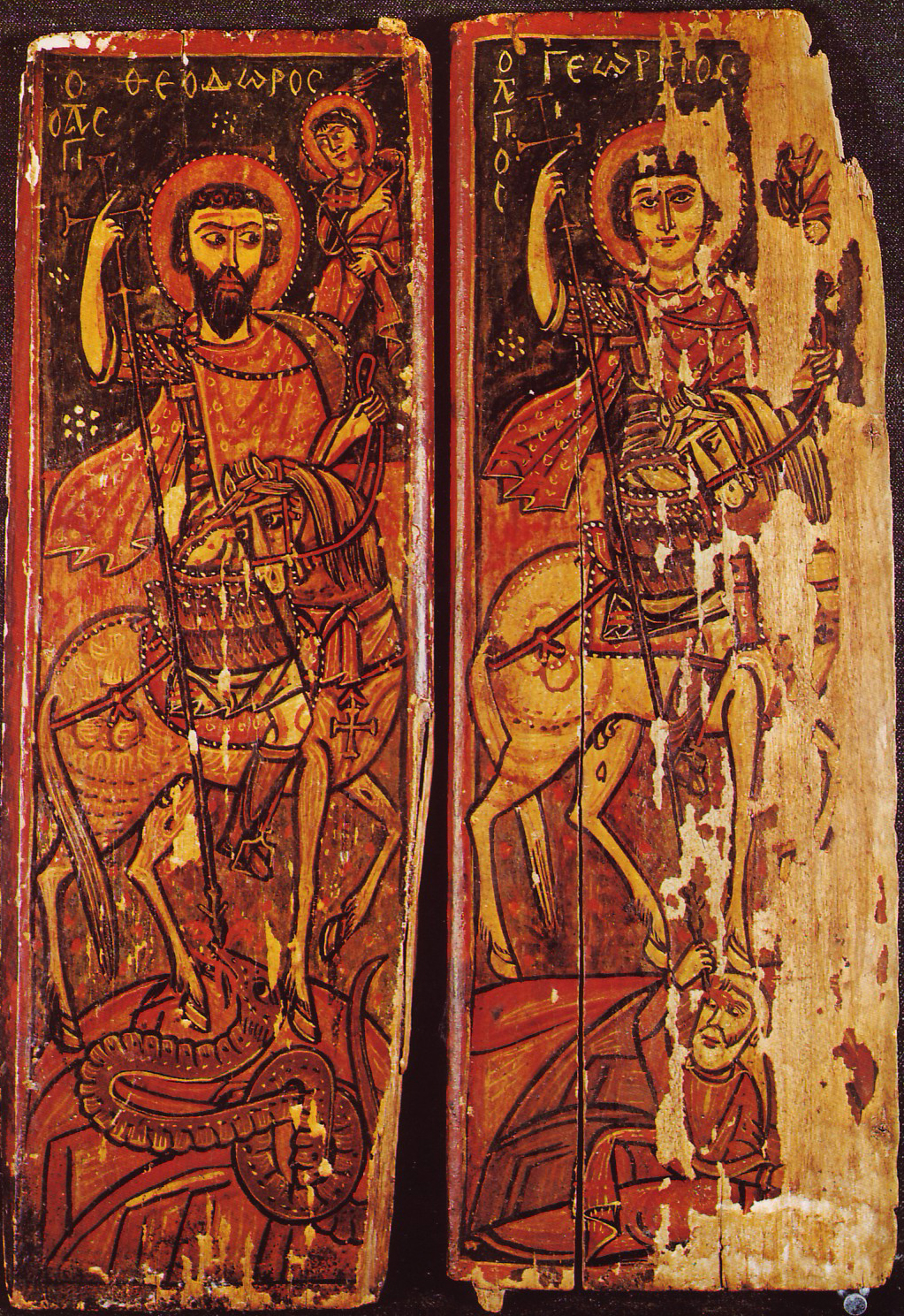
Saints Theodore and George shown side by side as equestrian heroes. Theodore kills a dragon and George a human enemy. Saint Catherine's Monastery, Sinai, 9th or 10th century

The dragon motif was transferred to the George legend from that of his fellow soldier saint, Saint Theodore Tiro.

The transfer of the dragon iconography from Theodore, or Theodore and George as "Dioskuroi" to George on his own, first becomes tangible in the early 11th century. The oldest certain images of Saint George combatting the serpent are still found in Cappadocia.

== Golden Legend ==
In the well-known version from Jacobus de Voragine's Legenda aurea (The Golden Legend, 1260s), the narrative episode of Saint George and the Dragon took place somewhere he called "Silene" in what in medieval times was referred to as "Libya" (basically anywhere in North Africa, west of the Nile). Silene was being plagued by a venom-spewing dragon dwelling in a nearby pond, poisoning the countryside. To prevent it from affecting the city itself, the people offered it two sheep daily, then a man and a sheep, and finally their children and youths, chosen by lottery. One time the lot fell on the king's daughter. The king offered all his gold and silver to have his daughter spared, but the people refused. The daughter was sent out to the lake, dressed as a bride, to be fed to the dragon.

Saint George, described as a "tribune" (Roman military commander), arrived at the spot. The princess tried to send him away, but he vowed to remain. The dragon emerged from the pond while they were conversing. Saint George made the Sign of the Cross and charged it on horseback, seriously wounding it with his lance. (Note: Caxton gives "with his spear", but Latin text gives lanceam fortiter vibrans.) He then called to the princess to throw him her girdle (zona; a rope-like belt), and he put it around the dragon's neck. Wherever she walked, the dragon followed the girl like a "meek beast" on a leash. (Note: Caxton gives "meek beast", but Latin text gives "mansuetissima canis (tamest dog)".) The same motif is also found in the legend of Graoully in Metz, France.

The princess and Saint George led the dragon back to the city of Silene, where it terrified the population. Saint George offered to kill the dragon if they consented to become Christians and be baptized. Fifteen thousand men including the king of Silene converted to Christianity. (Note: Latin text gives XX thousand.) George then killed the dragon, beheading it with his sword, and the body was carted out of the city on four ox-carts. The king built a church to the Blessed Virgin Mary and Saint George on the site where the dragon died and a spring flowed from its altar with water that cured all disease. Only the Latin version involves the saint striking the dragon with the spear, before killing it with the sword.

The Golden Legend narrative is the main source of the story of Saint George and the Dragon as received in Western Europe, and is therefore relevant for Saint George as patron saint of England. The princess remains unnamed in the Golden Legend version, and the name "Sabra" is supplied by Elizabethan era writer Richard Johnson in his Seven Champions of Christendom (1596). In the work, she is recast as a princess of Egypt. This work takes great liberties with the material, and makes Saint George marry Sabra (Note: Saint George is supposed to have been martyred as a virgin according to his hagiography.) and have English children, one of whom becomes Guy of Warwick. Alternative names given to the princess in Italian sources still of the 13th century are Cleolinda and Aia. Johnson also supplied the name of Saint George's sword: "Ascalon". The story of Saint George, as the Red Cross Knight and the patron saint of England, slaying the dragon, which represents sin, and Princess Una as George's true love and an allegory representing the Protestant church as the one true faith, was told in altered fashion in Edmund Spenser's The Faerie Queene.

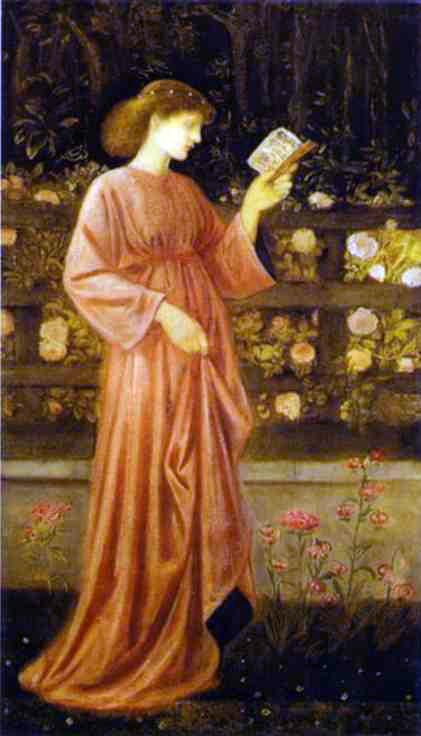
Princess Sabra (the King's Daughter), by Edward Burne-Jones, 1865

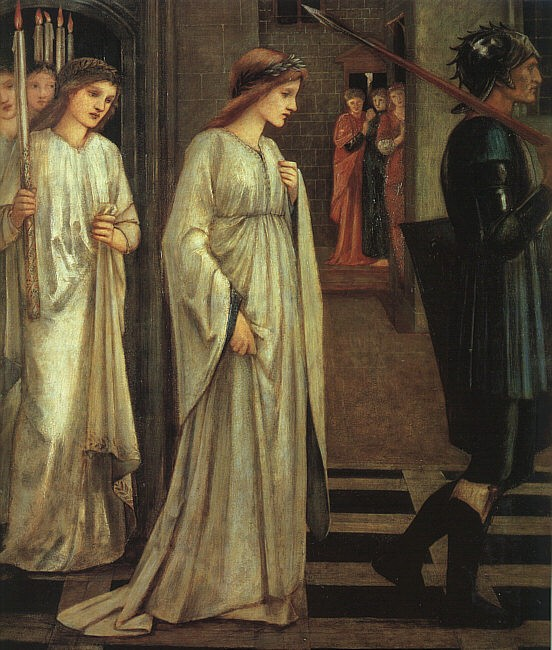
Princess Sabra Led to the Dragon by Edward Burne-Jones, 1866

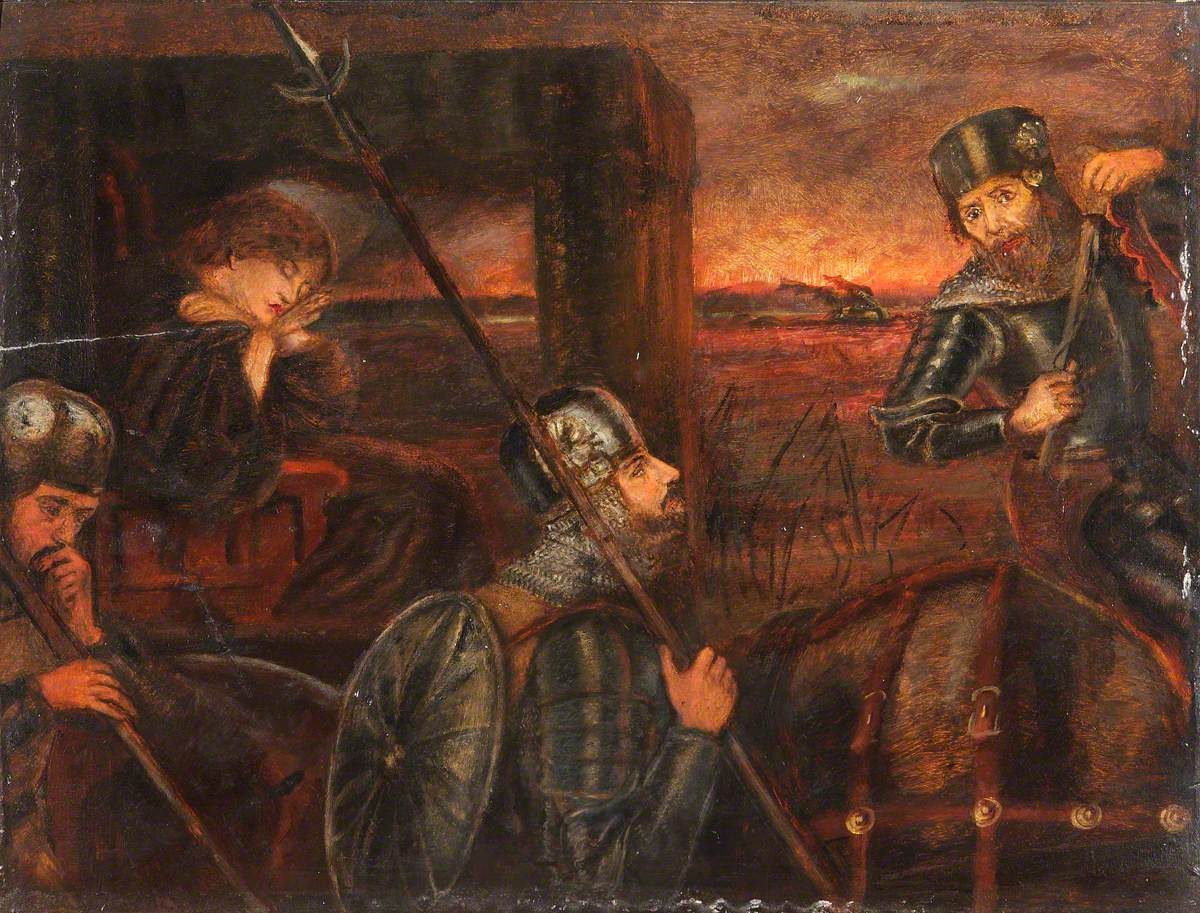
The Princess Sabra Taken to the Dragon, by Henry Treffry Dunn, 1896

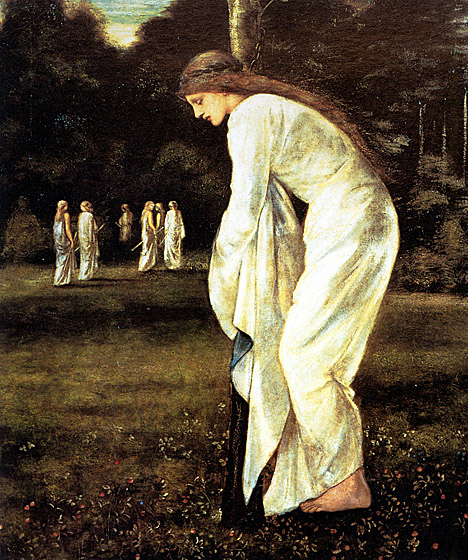
The Princess Tied to the Tree by Edward Burne-Jones, 1866

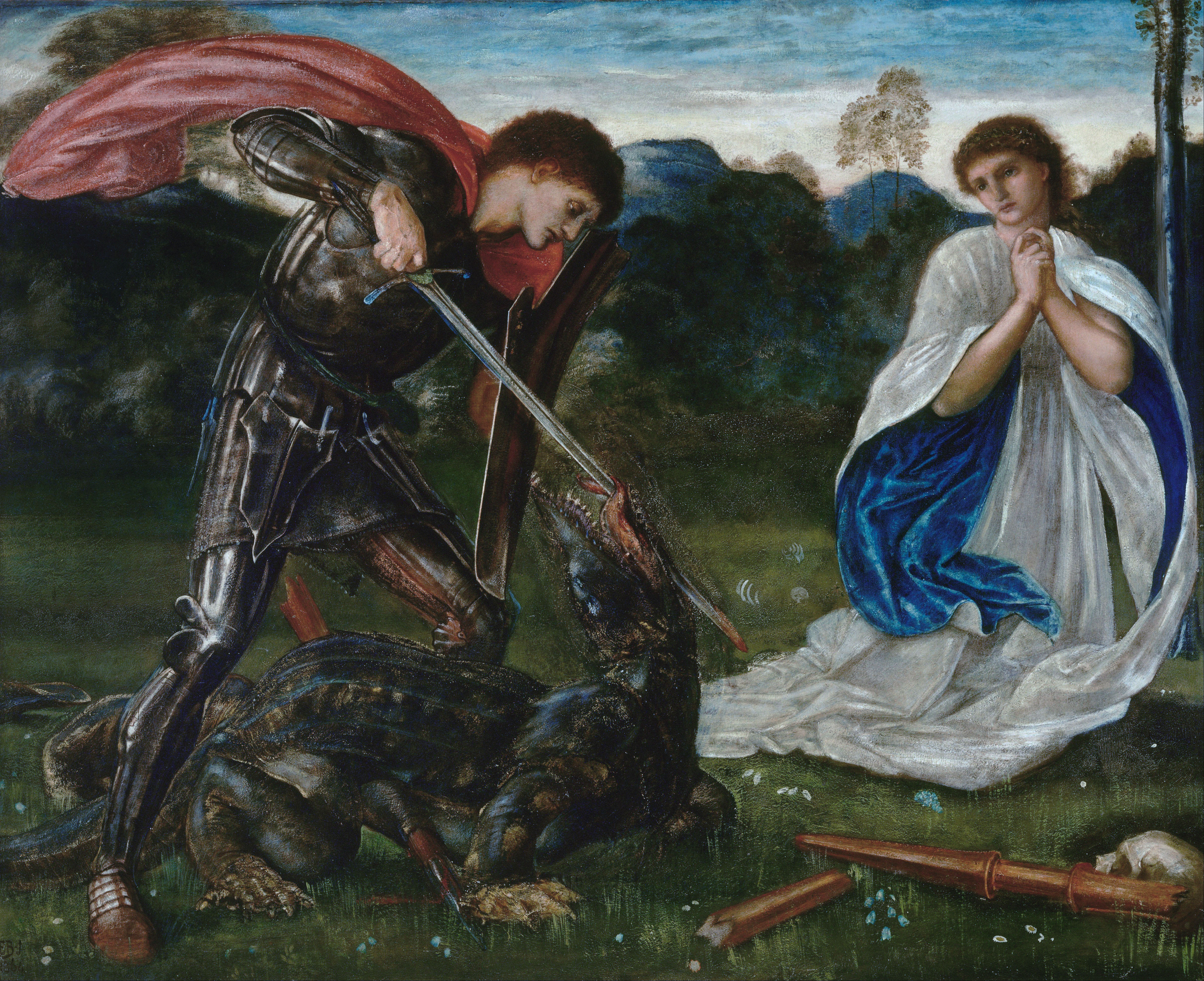
The Fight: Saint George Kills the Dragon, by Edward Burne-Jones, 1866

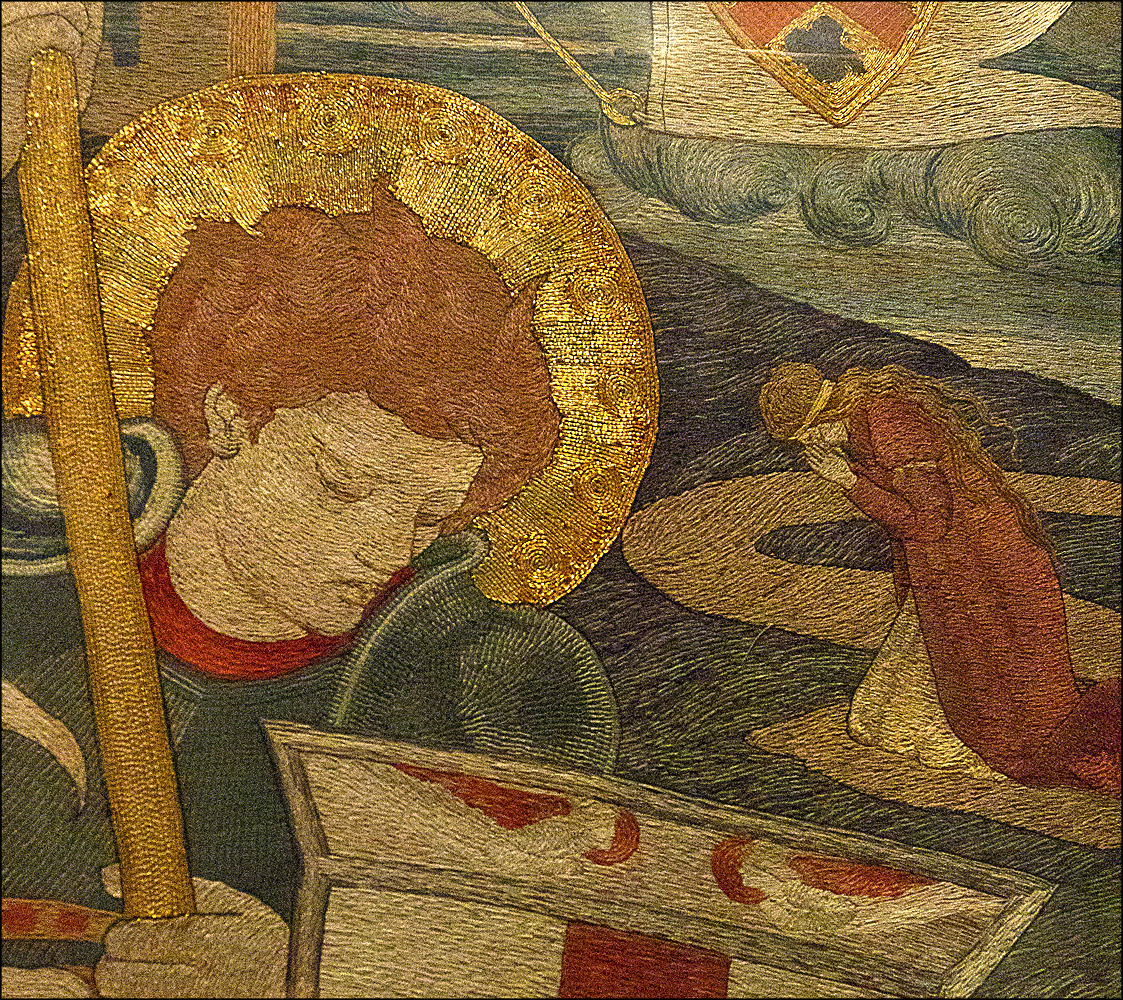
Saint George Slaying The Dragon, With Una Praying In The Background, by Phoebe Anna Traquair, 1904

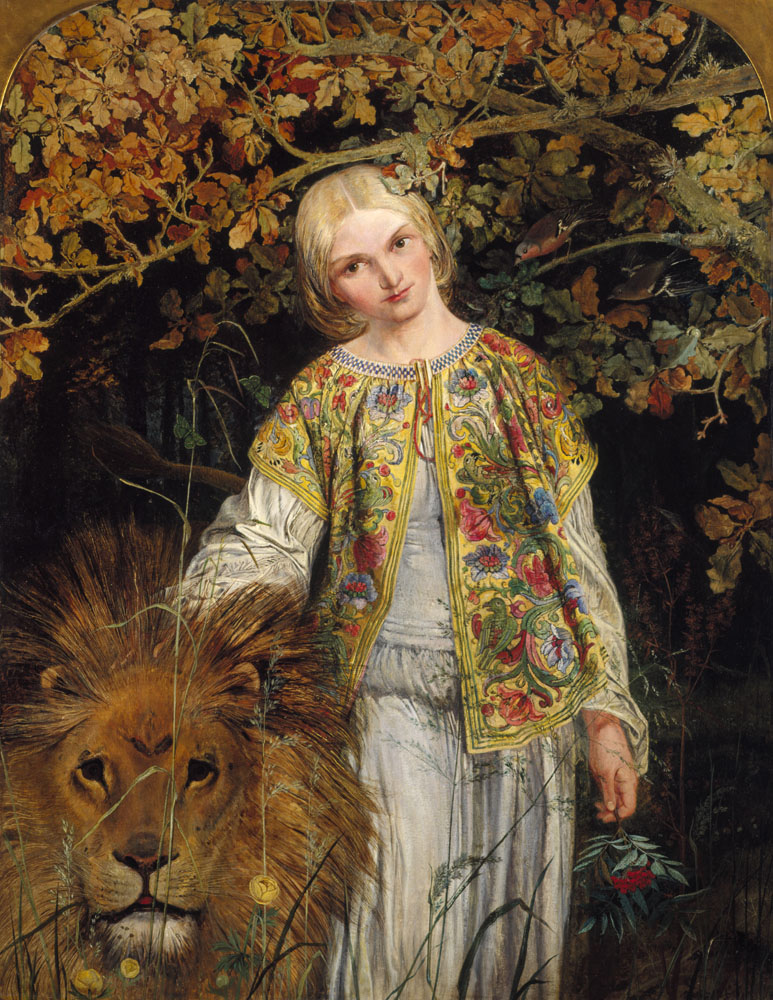
Una and the Lion by William Bell Scott, 1860

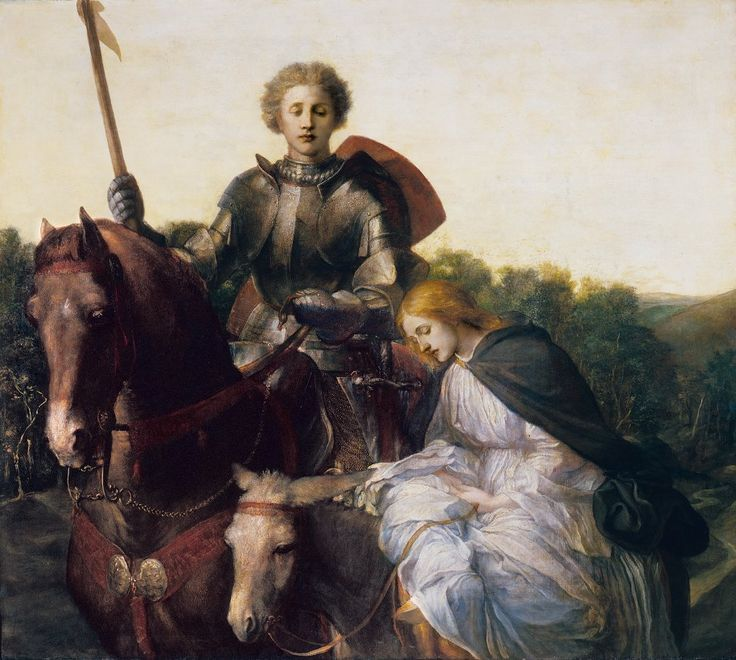
Una and the Red Cross Knight by George Frederic Watts, 1860

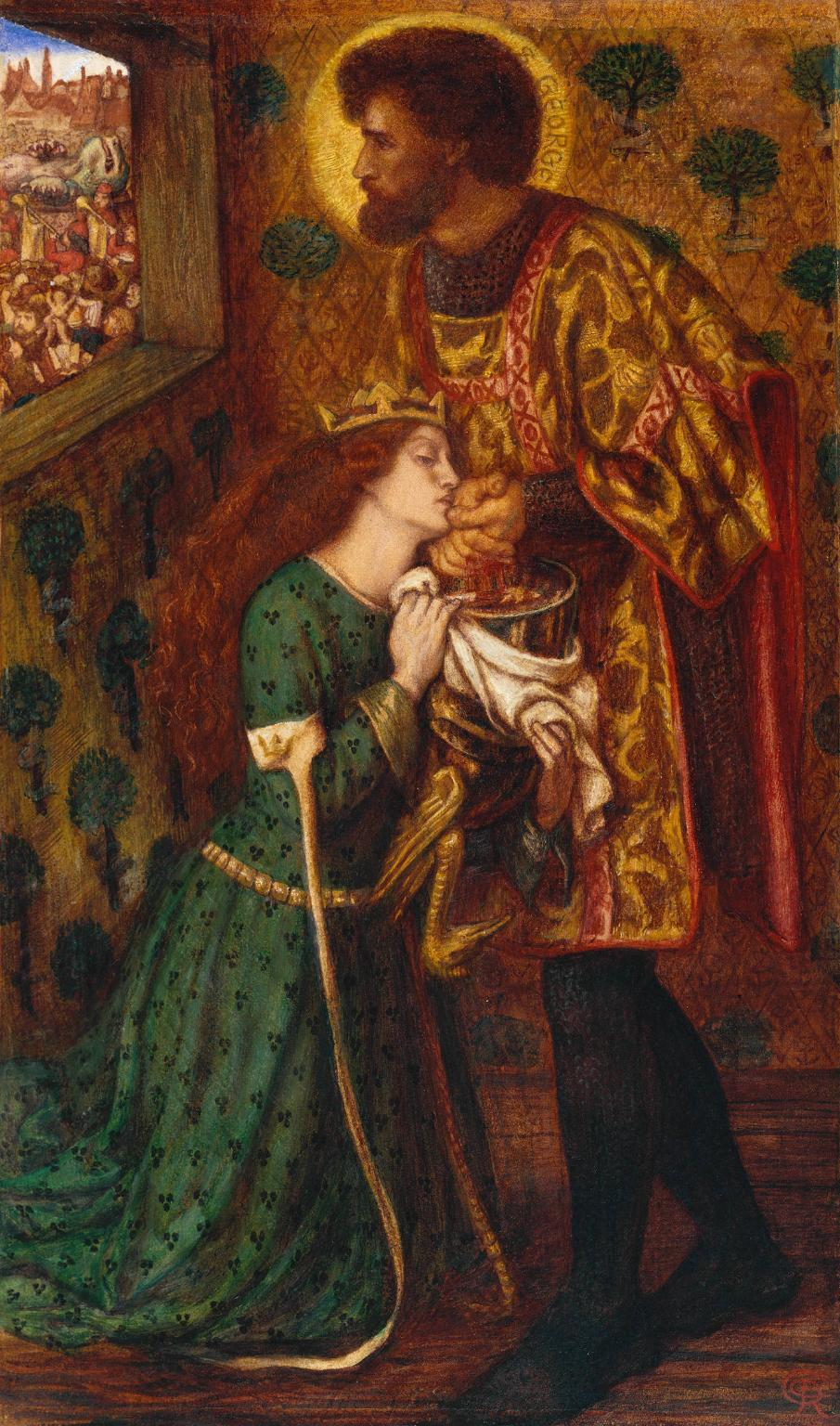
Saint George and Princess Sabra by Dante Gabriel Rossetti, 1862

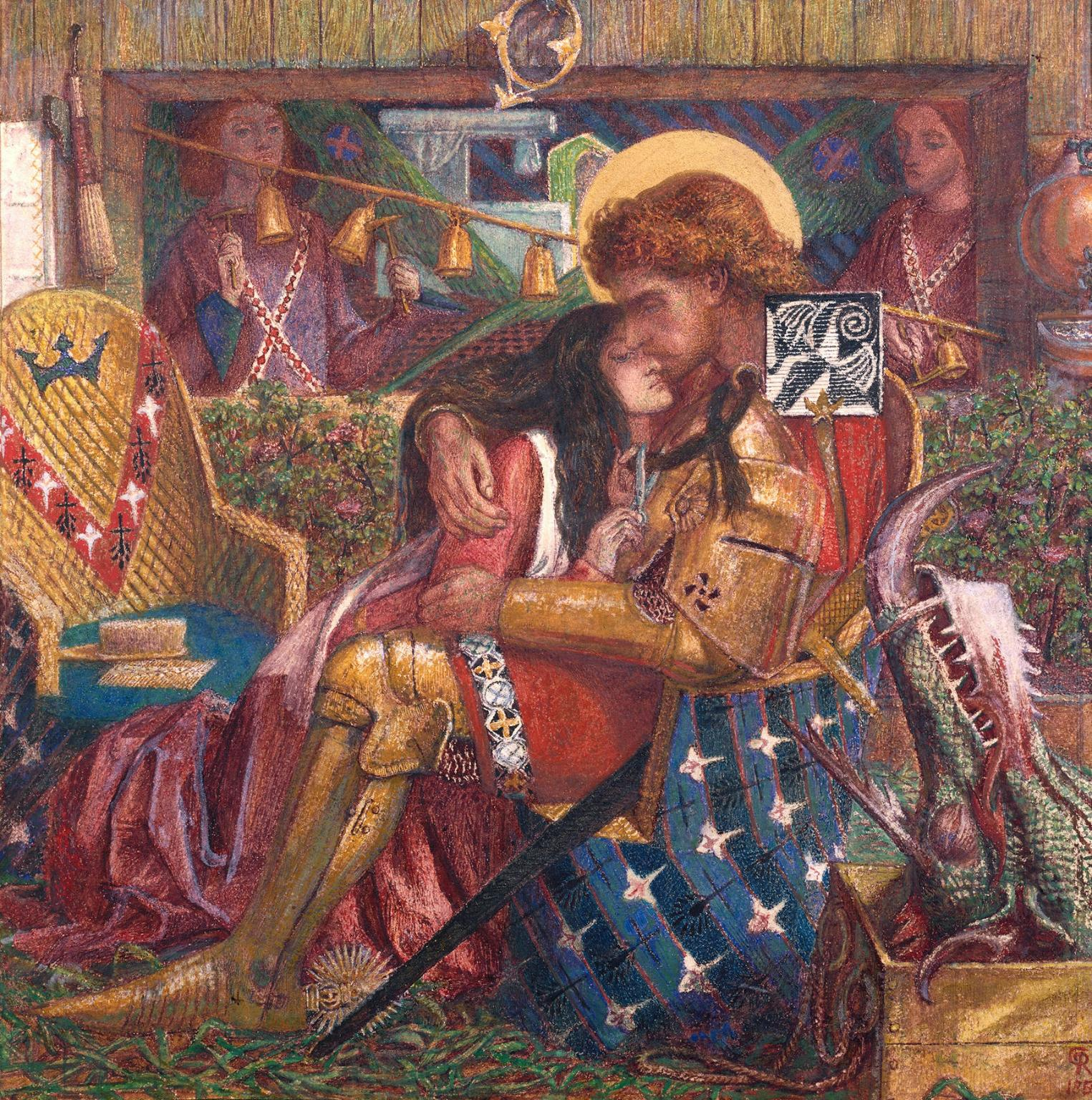
The Wedding of Saint George and Princess Sabra by Dante Gabriel Rossetti, 1857

== Relics ==
Arm of St. George: Originally housed at the Benedictine Convent by the St. George's Basilica, Prague at Prague Castle, now exhibited at the Metropolitan chapter room of St. Vitus Cathedral also at Prague Castle.

Skull of the Dragon: Kept at the Karlštejn Castle outside of Prague. It is first mentioned in 1355 and identified as a dragon's head in 1515; by the 18th century it becomes identified as the skull of a crocodile.

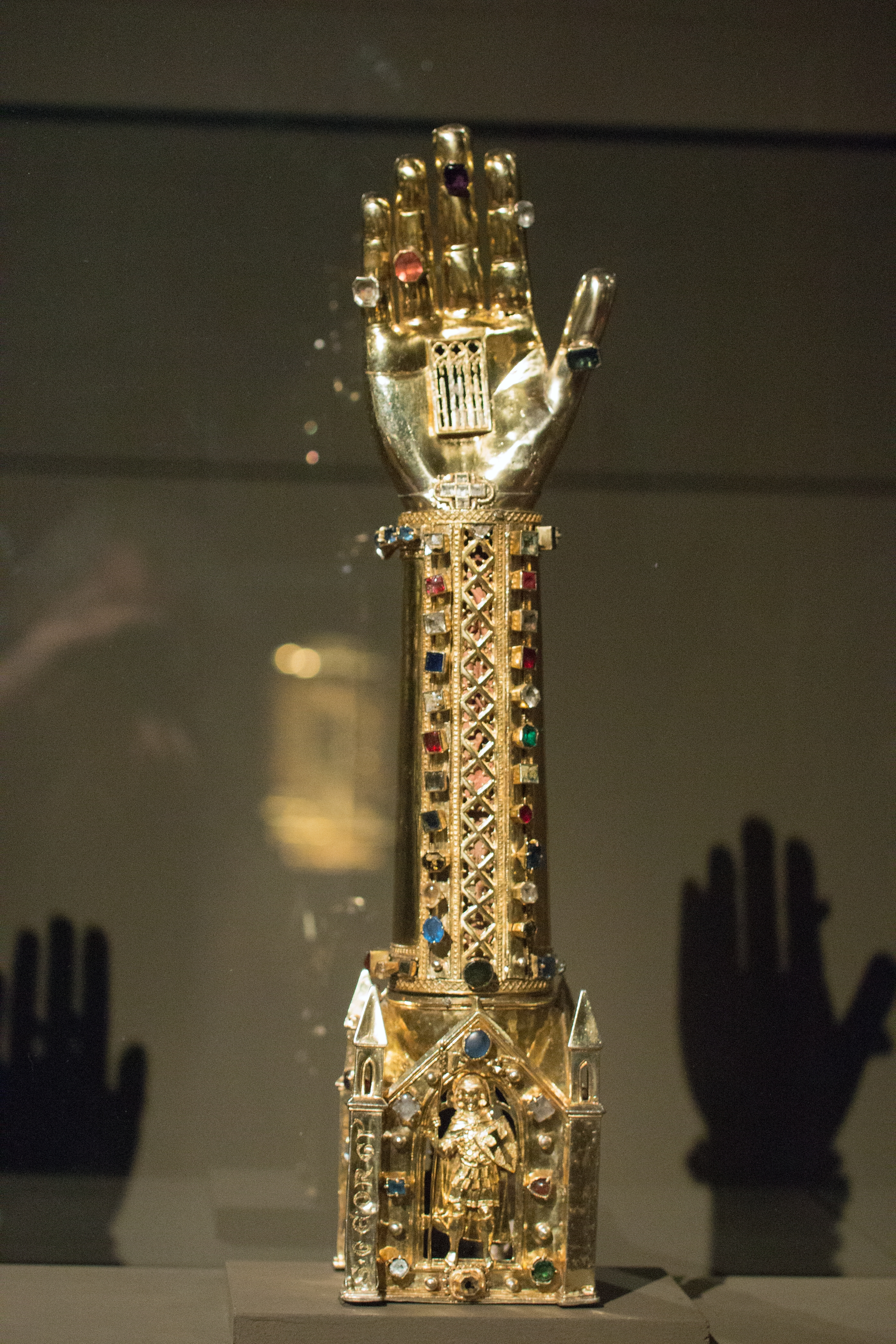
Reliquary of the Arm of St. George at St. Vitus Cathedral in Prague

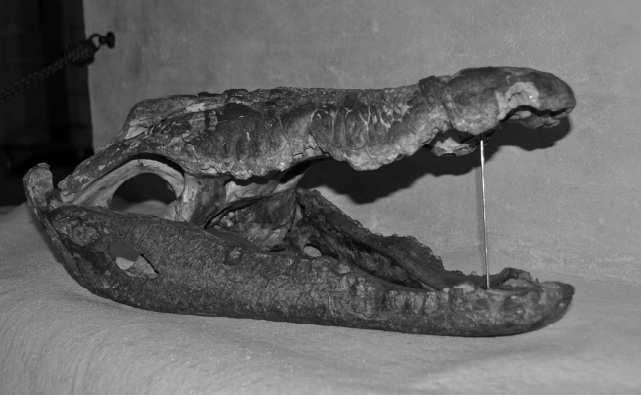
Relic of the skull of the dragon slayed by Saint George, kept since the time of Charles IV at the Karlštejn Castle, Czech Republic

== Iconography ==
=== Medieval iconography ===
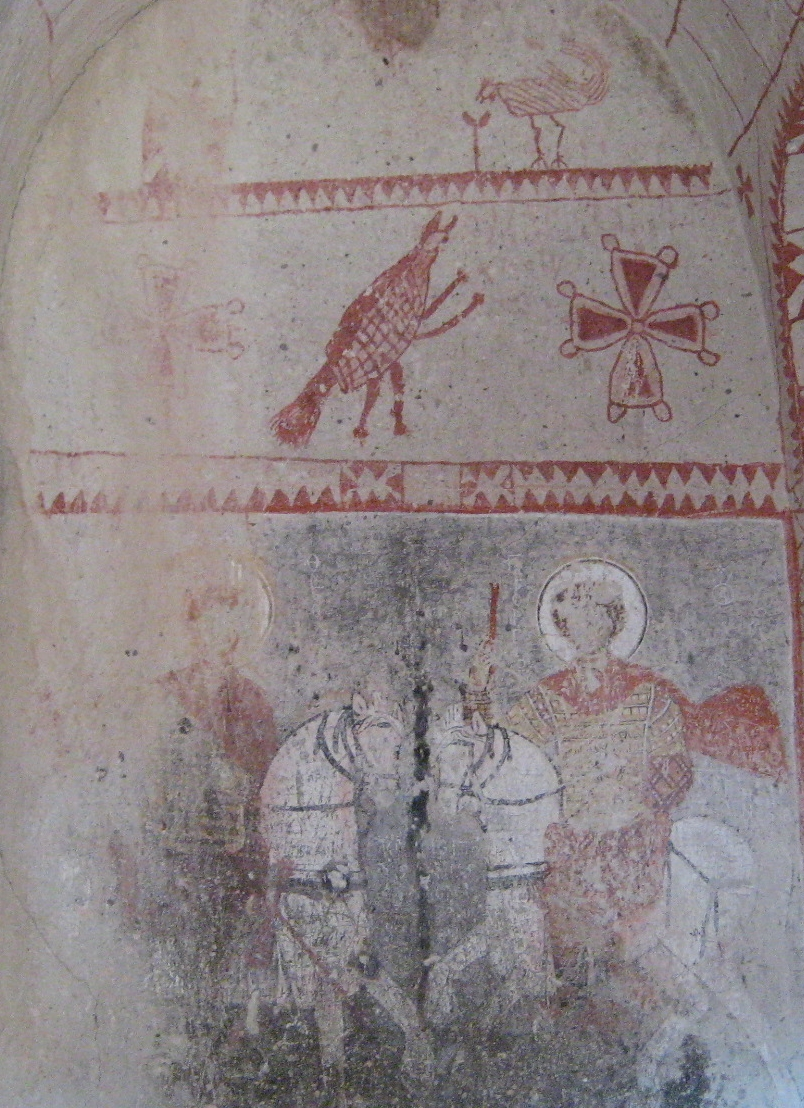
Saints George and Theodore on horseback killing the dragon, fresco in Saint Barbara church in Göreme, Cappadocia. Dated to the early 11th century, this image has been identified as the oldest known depiction of Saint George as dragon-slayer.

==== Eastern ====
The saint is depicted in the style of a Roman cavalryman in the tradition of the "Thracian Heros". There are two main iconographic types, the "concise" form showing only George and the dragon, and the "detailed" form also including the princess and the city walls or towers of Lacia (Lasia) with spectators witnessing the miracle. The "concise" type originates in Cappadocia, in the 10th to 11th century (transferred from the same iconography associated with Saint Theodore of Tiro in the 9th to 10th century). The earliest certain example of the "detailed" form may be a fresco from Pavnisi (dated c. 1160), although the examples from Adishi, Bochorma and Ikvi may be slightly earlier.

Georgian

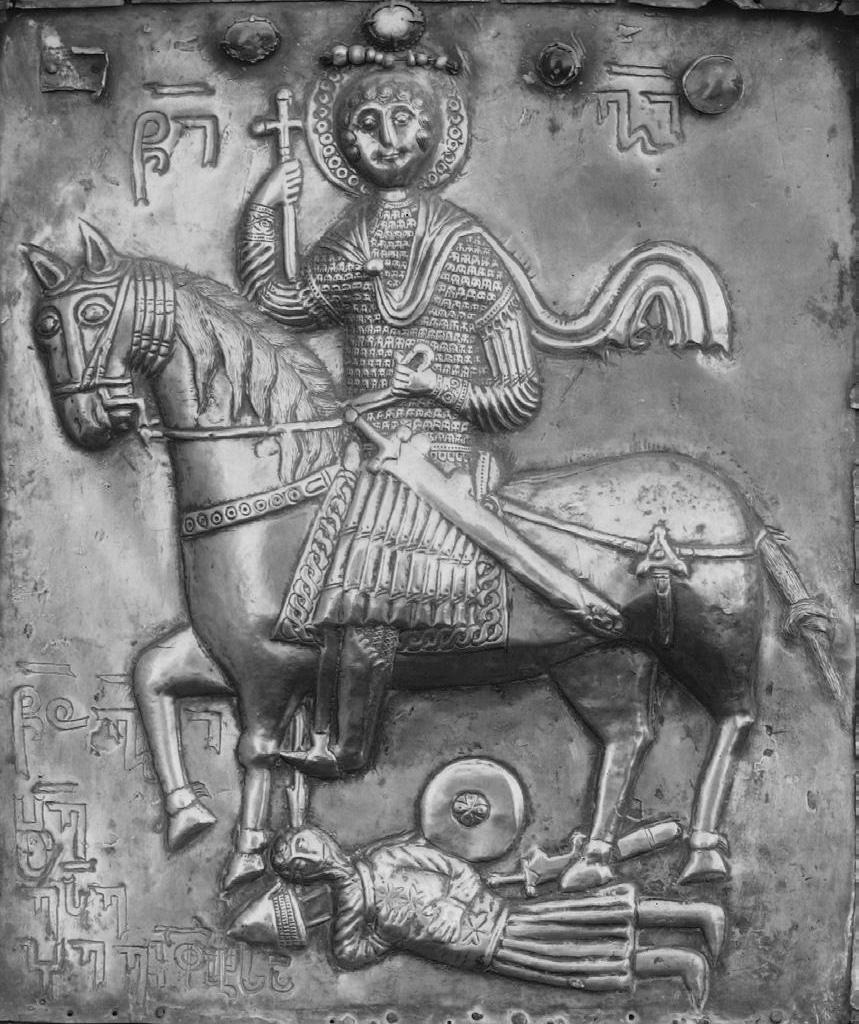
Saint George of Parakheti, Georgia, late 10th century

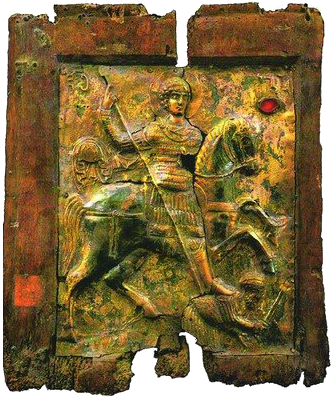
Saint George of Labechina, Racha, Georgia, early 11th century

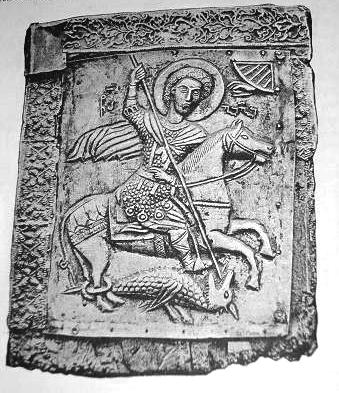
Icon of Saint George and the dragon from Likhauri (Ozurgeti Municipality), Georgia, 12th century

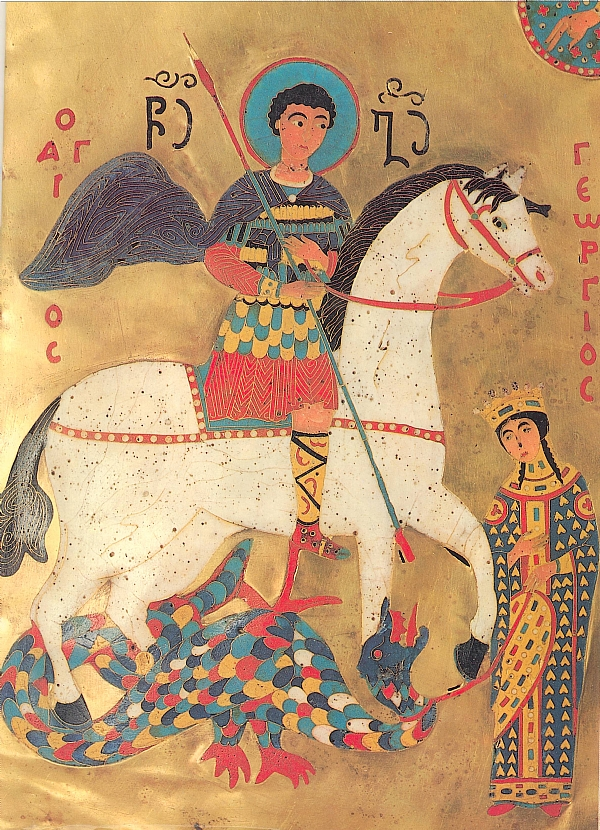
A 15th-century Georgian cloisonné enamel icon

Greek

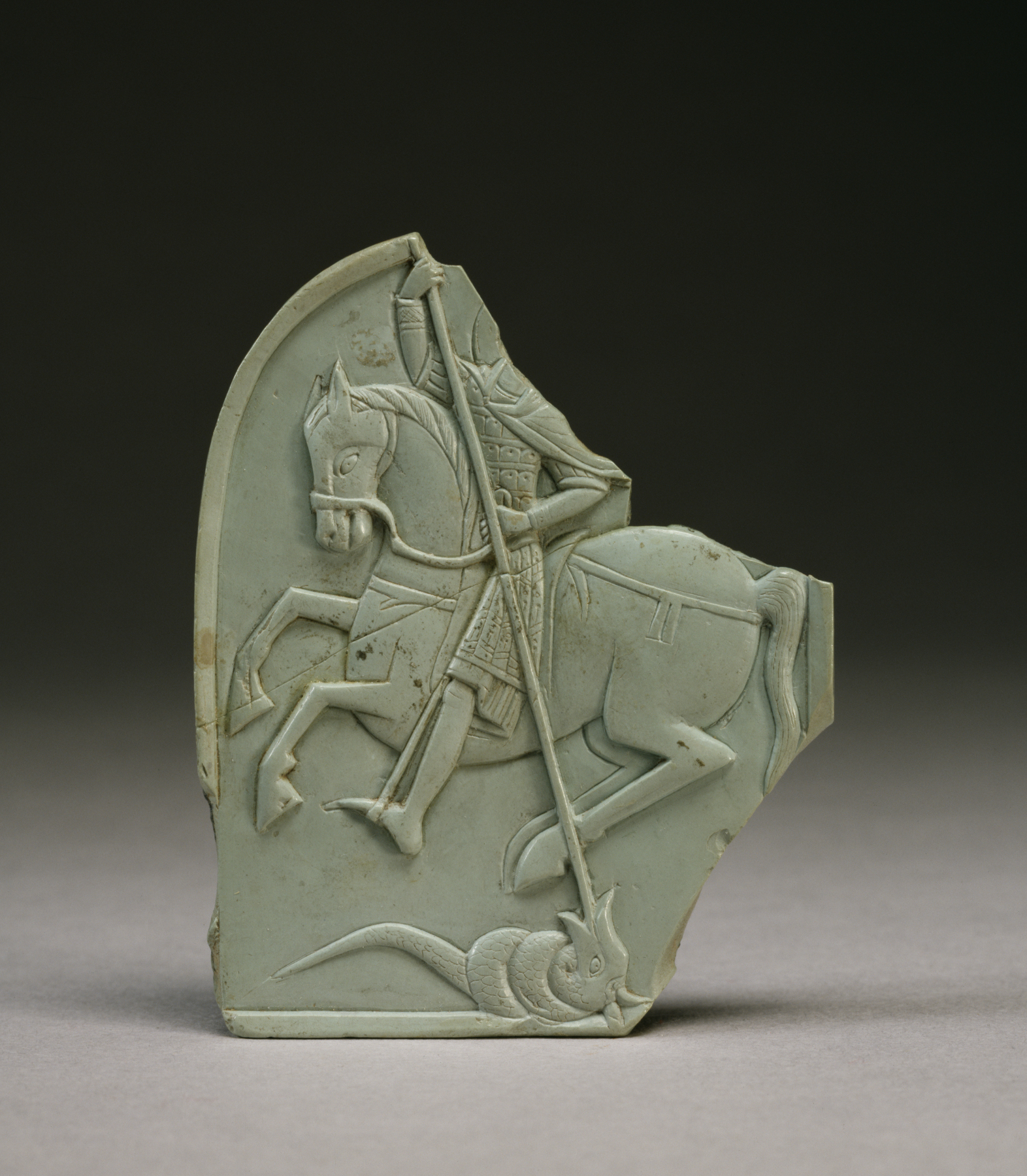
Byzantine bas-relief of Saint George and the Dragon (steatite), 12th century

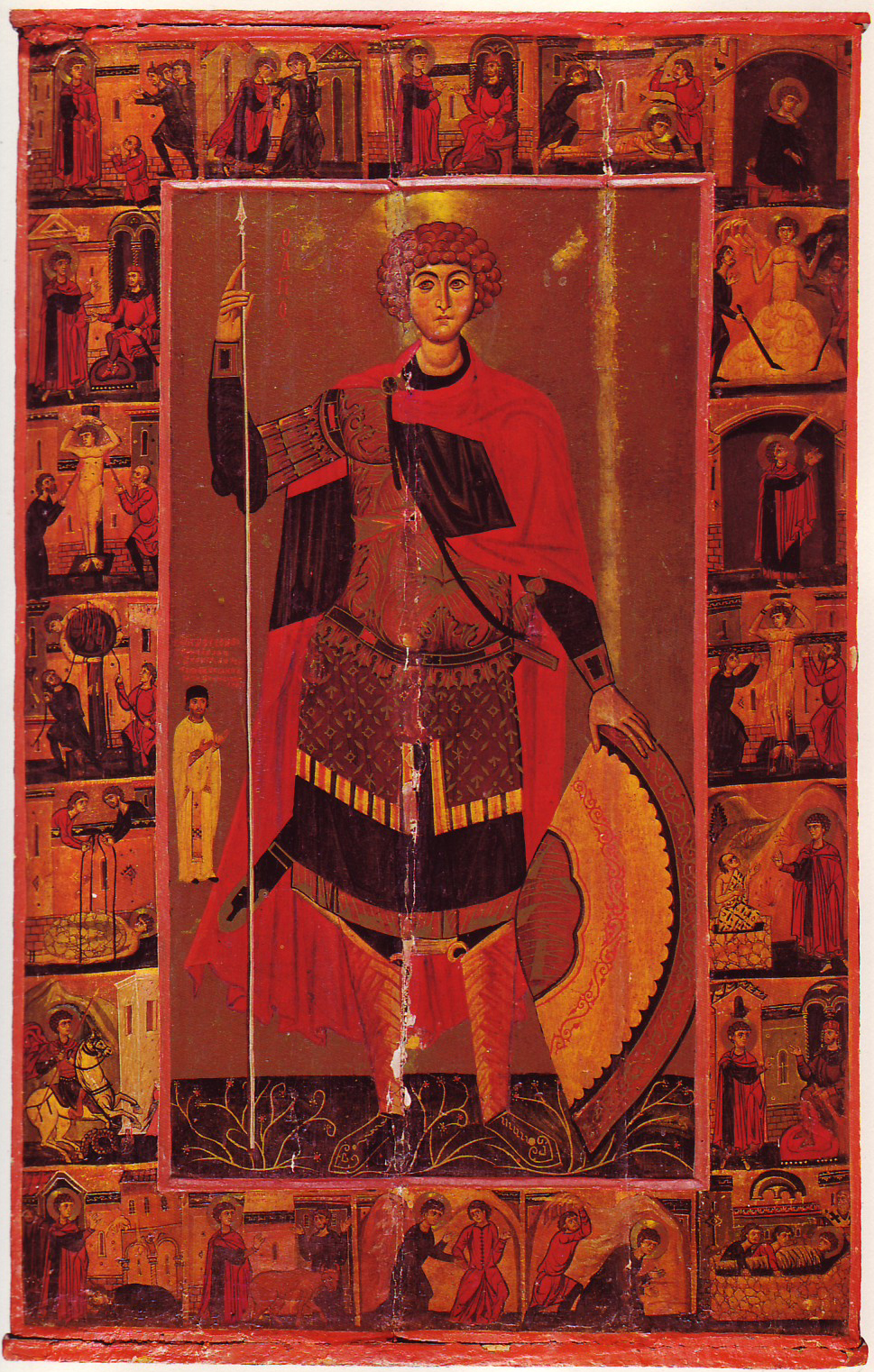
Monumental vita icon at Sinai, first half of the 13th century, likely by a Greek artist. The dragon episode is shown in one of twenty panels depicting the saint's life.

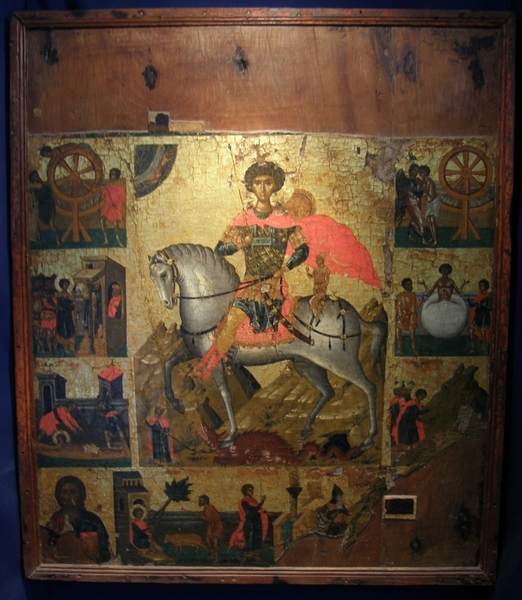
Greek icon of St George with the youth of Mytilene, 15th century, Pyrgos, Santorini

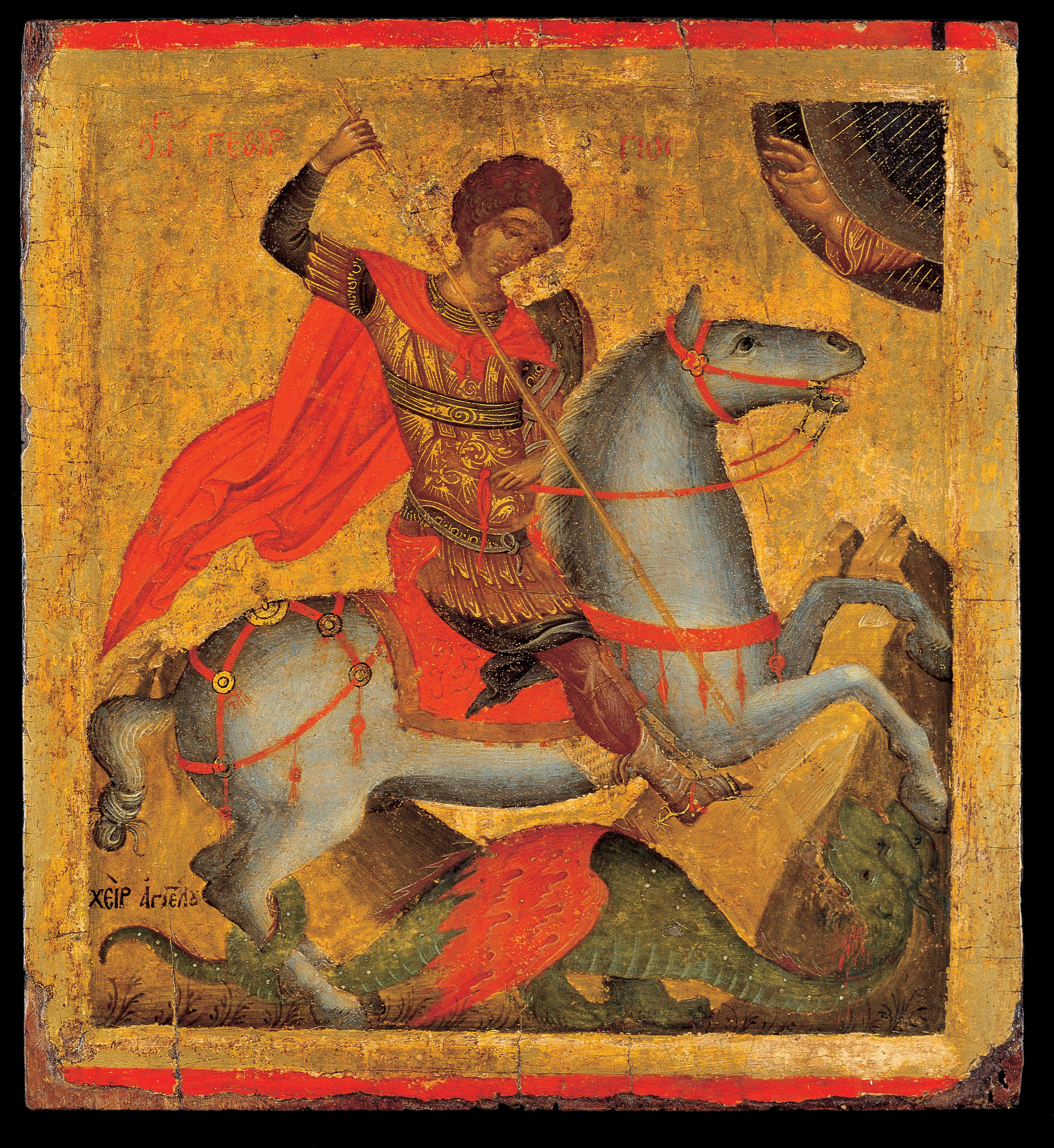
Icon by Angelos Akotandos, Crete (first half of the 15th century)

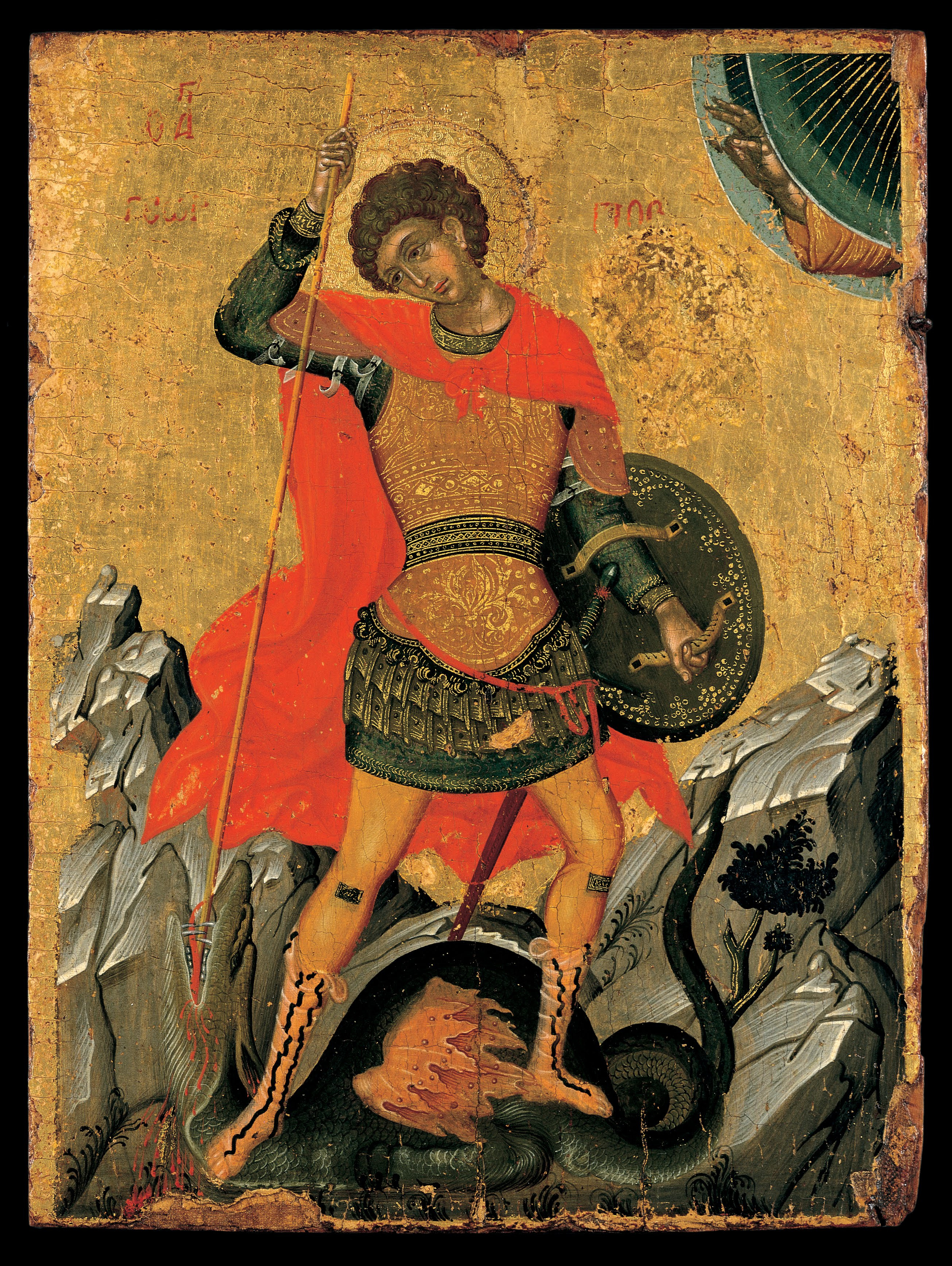
"Pedestrian" St George, Crete, second half of the 15th century

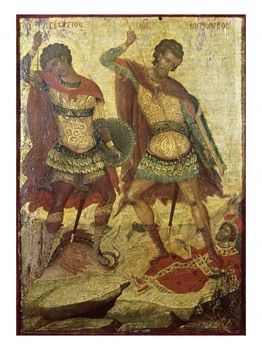
Michael Damaskinos (16th century), Saint George killing the dragon, alongside Saint Mercurius killing Julian

Russian
The oldest example in Russia found on walls of the church of St George in Staraya Ladoga, dated c. 1167. In Russian tradition, the icon is known as Чудо Георгия о змие; i.e., "the miracle of George and the dragon". The saint is mostly shown on a white horse, facing right, but sometimes also on a black horse, or facing left. The princess is usually not included. Another motif shows George on horseback with the youth of Mytilene sitting behind him.

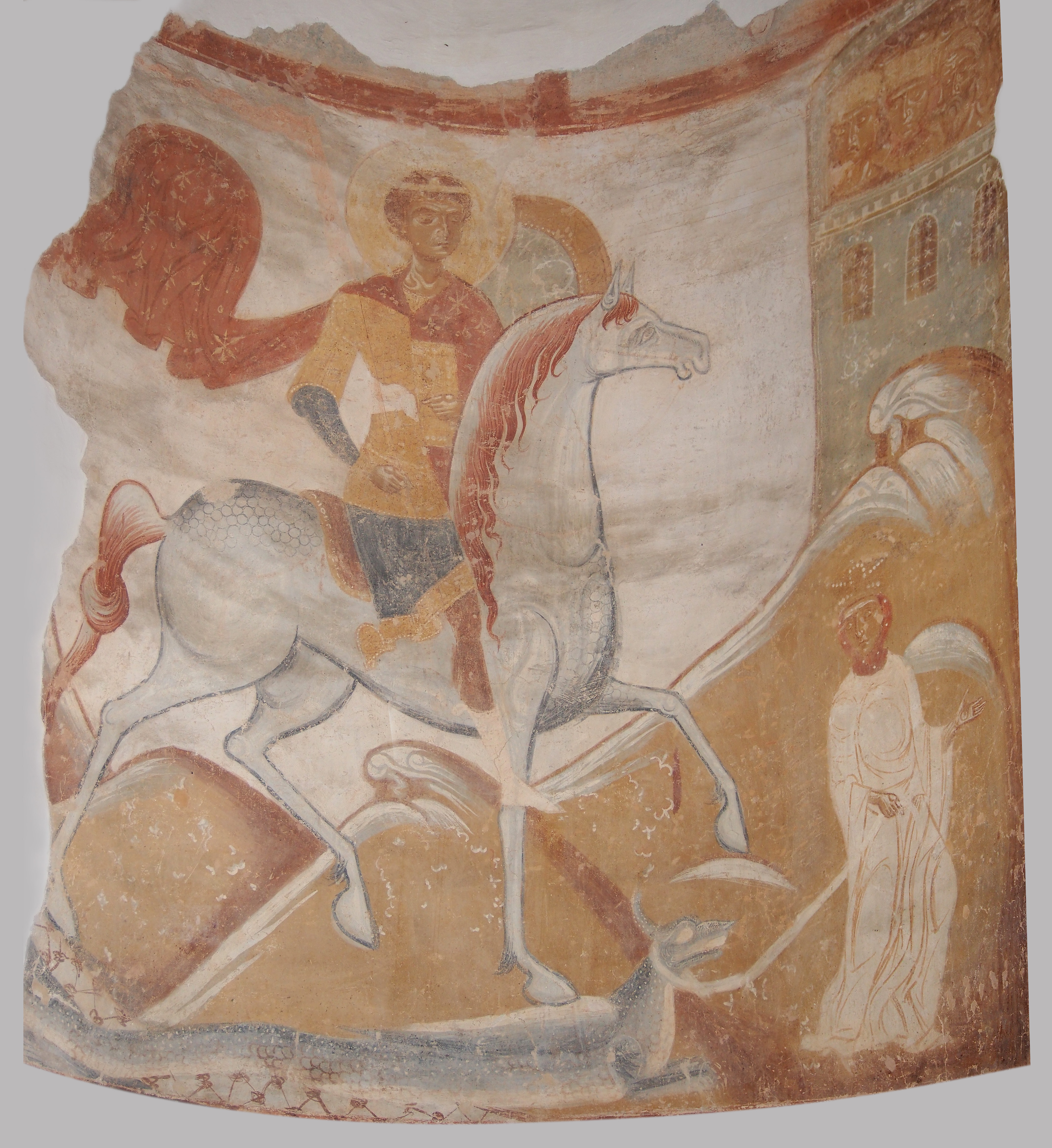
The Staraya Ladoga fresco, c. 1167

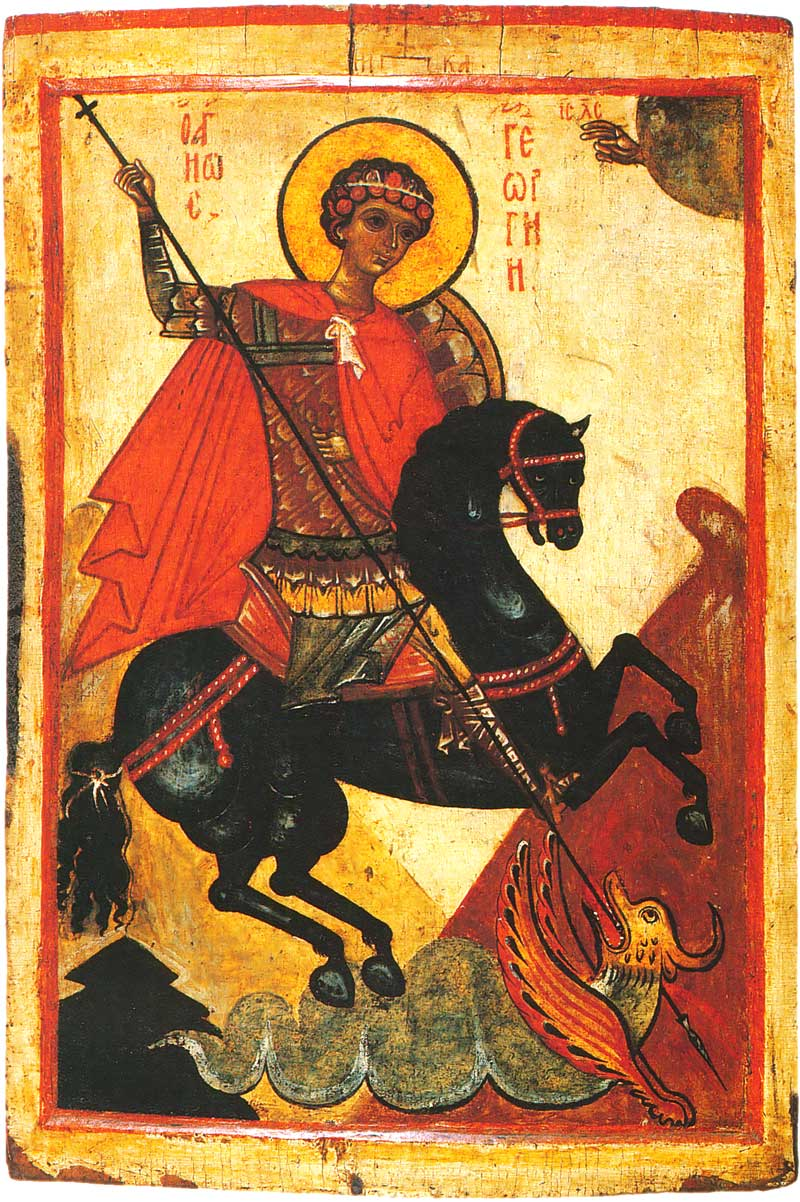
14th-century icon from Novgorod

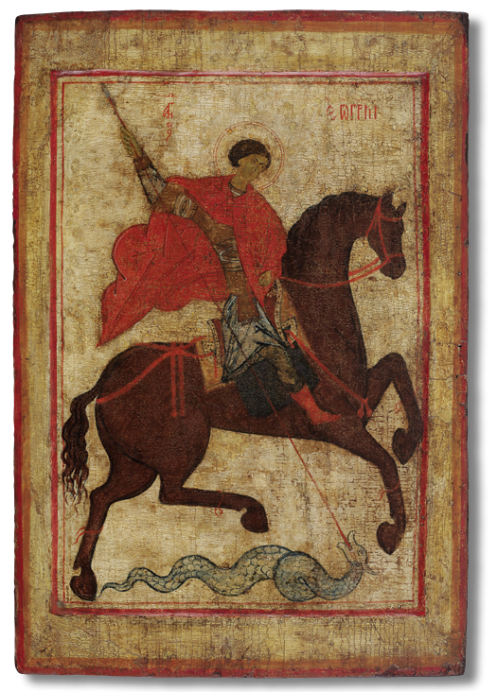
14th-century icon from Rostov

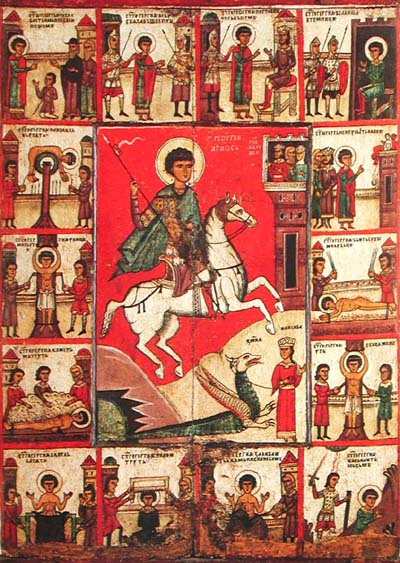
Novgorod vita icon, 14th century; the "detailed" dragon iconography takes the central panel.

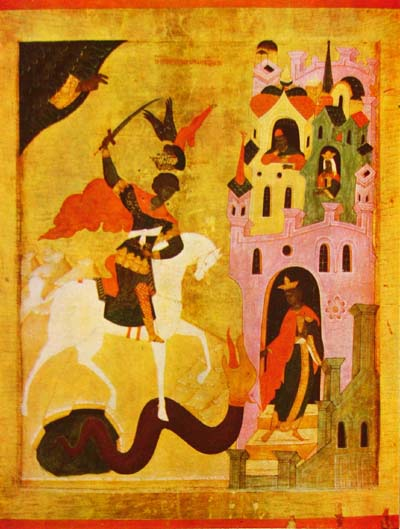
Russian icon of the "detailed" type, Moscow, early 15th century

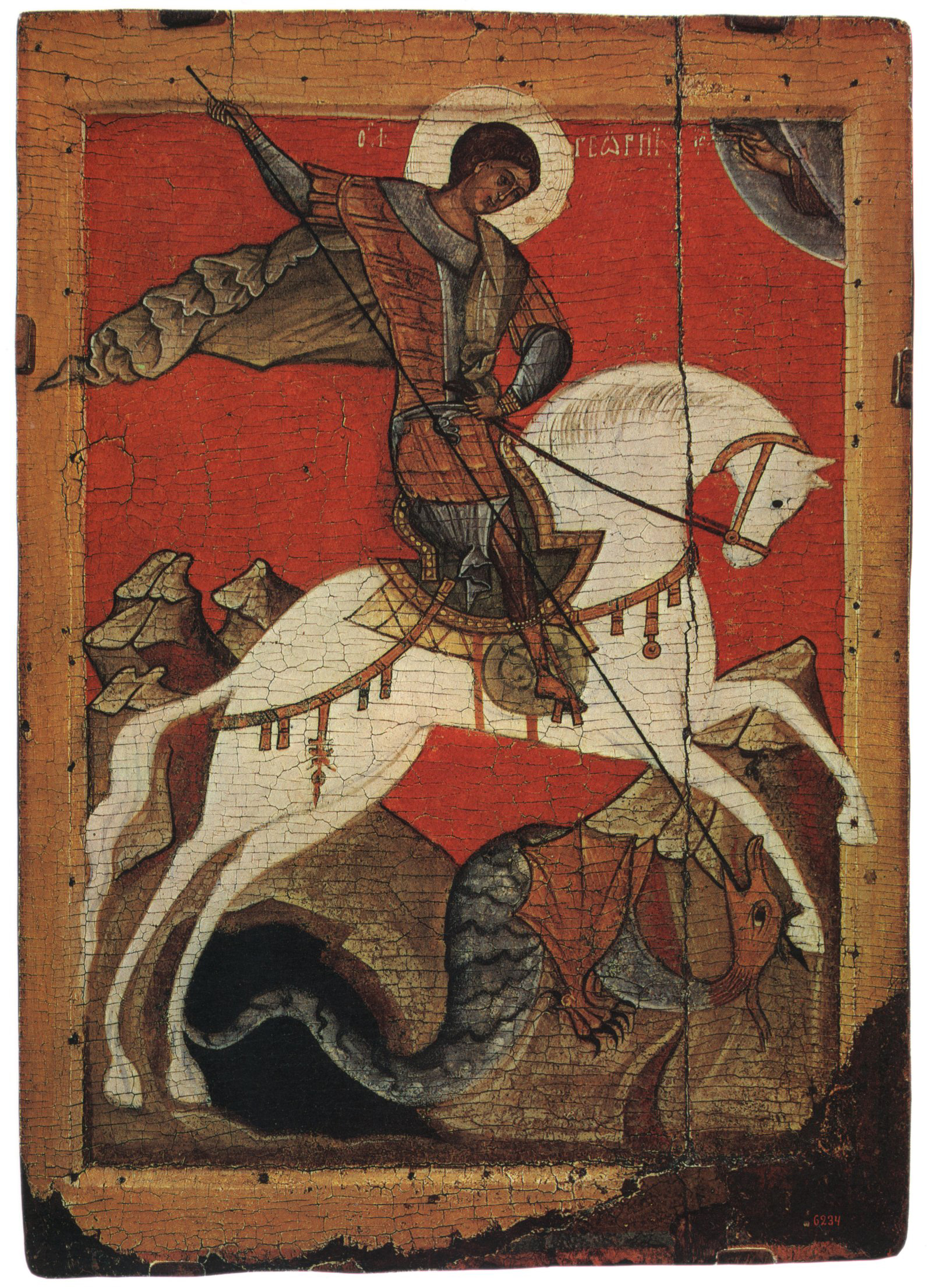
Novgorod icon, late 15th century

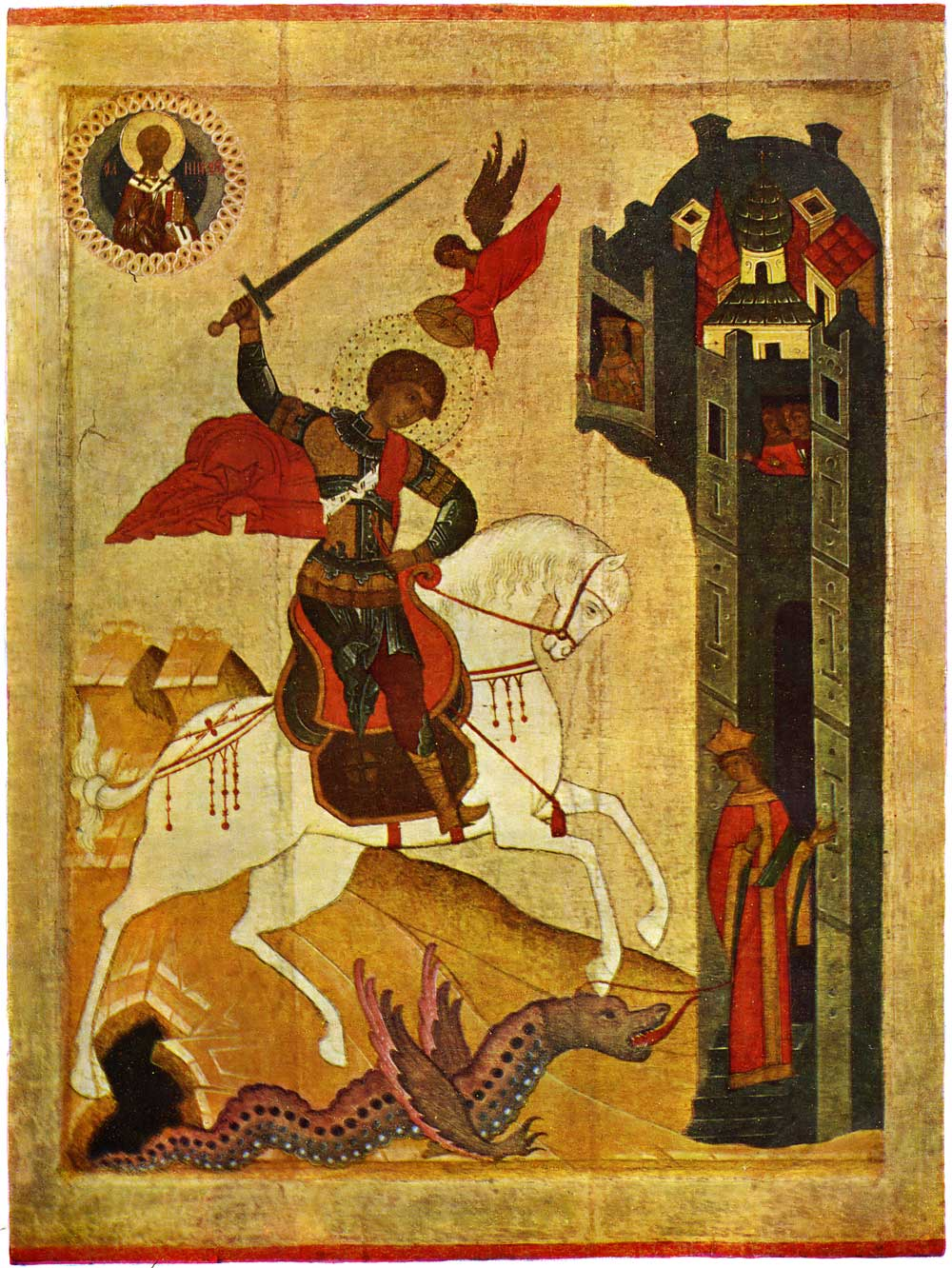
Northern Russian icon of the "detailed" type, the saint is exceptionally slaying the dragon with his sword (c. 1500).

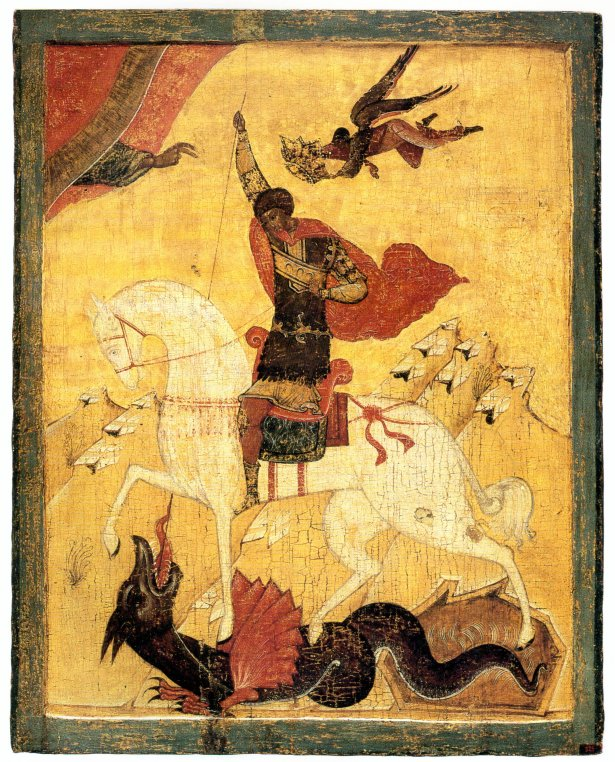
Chełm school, 16th century

Ethiopian

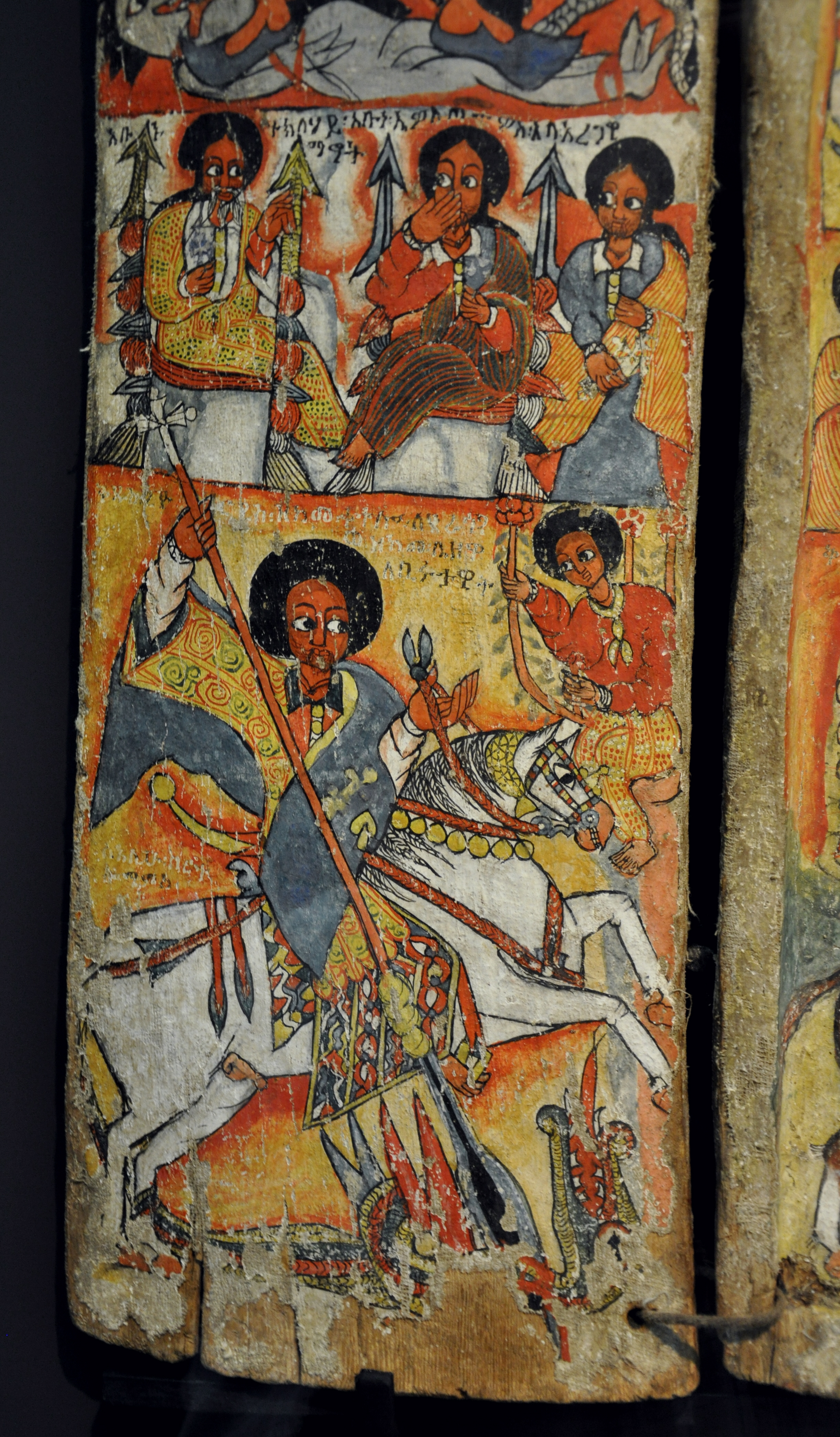
Great Triptych, Ethiopia, c. 1700, tempera on fabric on wood; Museum Rietberg, Zurich, Switzerland

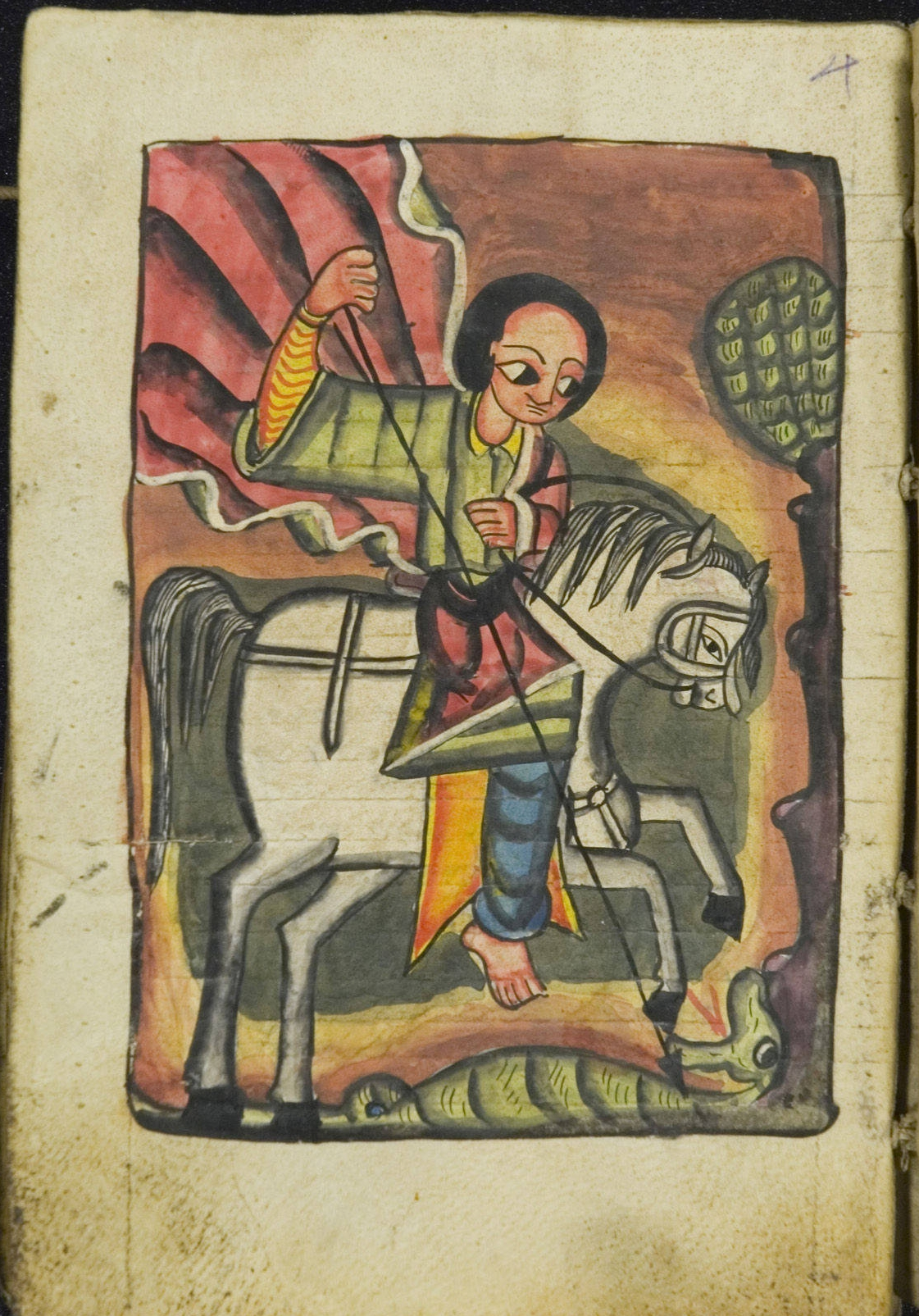
Alwan Codex 27 Ethiopian Biblical Icon - Saint George (20th century)

==== Western ====
The motif of Saint George as a knight on horseback slaying the dragon first appears in western art in the second half of the 13th century. The tradition of the saint's arms being shown as the red-on-white Saint George's Cross develops in the 14th century.

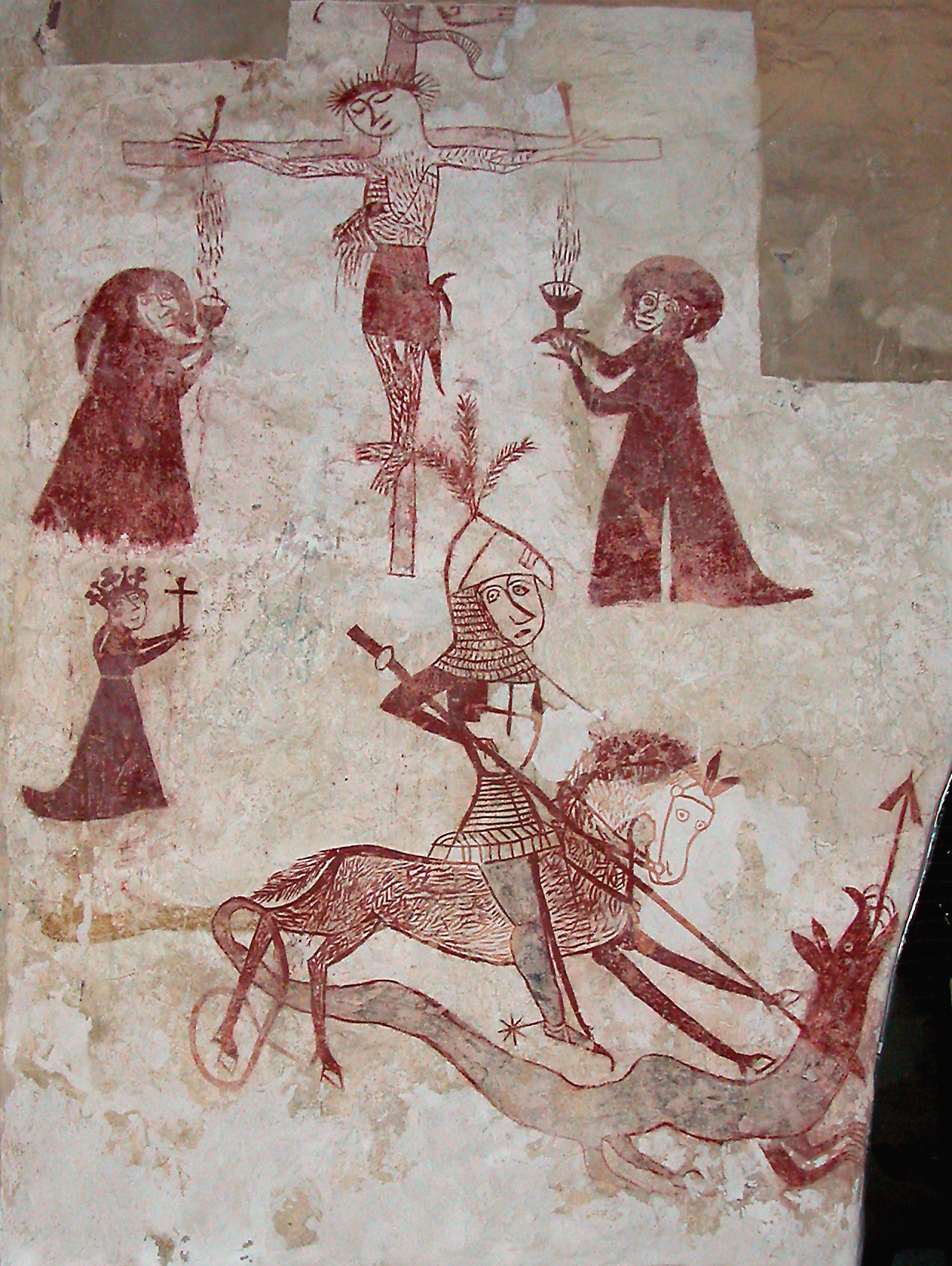
13th-century fresco in Ankershagen, Mecklenburg

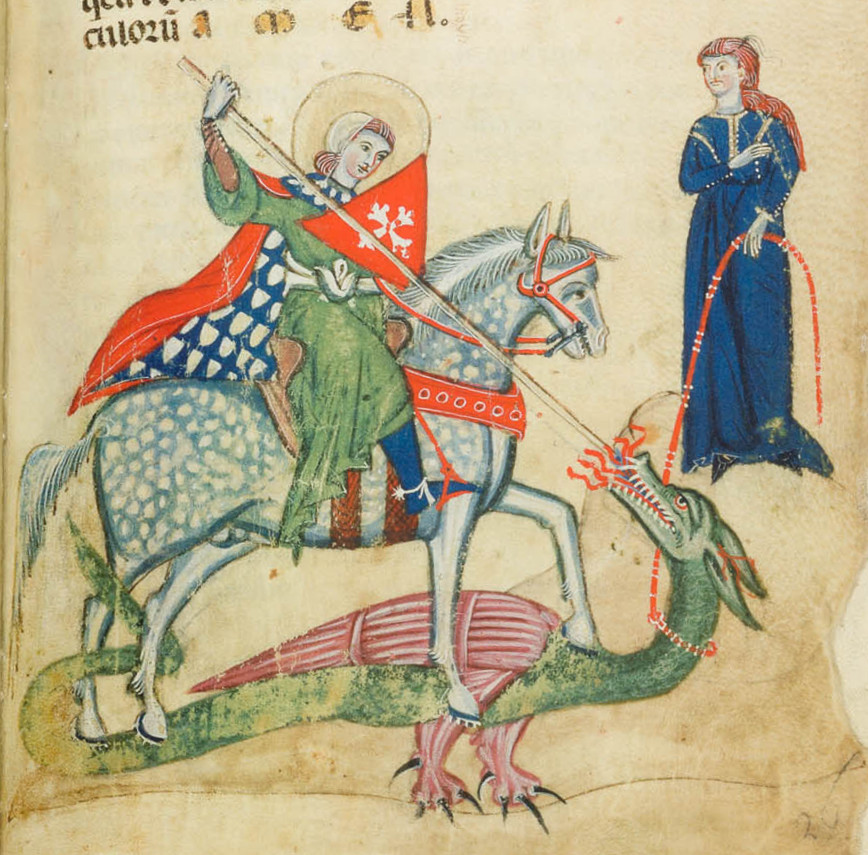
Miniature from a Passio Sancti Georgii manuscript (Verona, second half of 13th century)

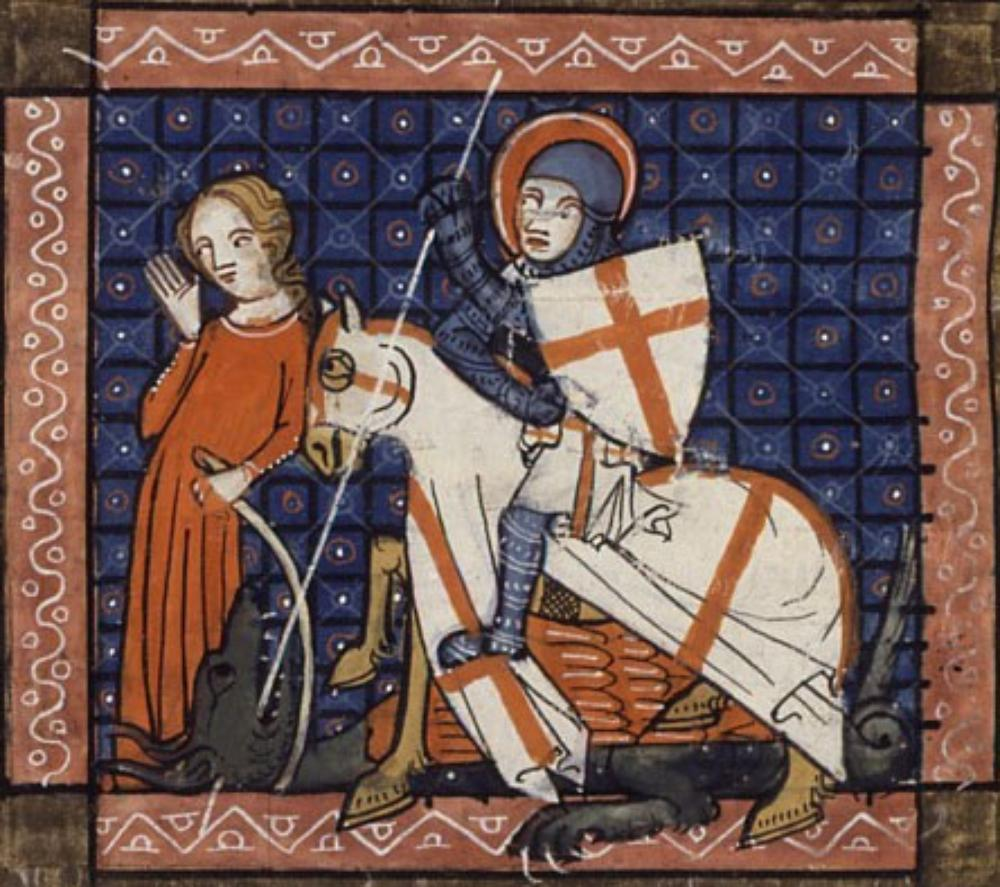
Miniature from a manuscript of Legenda Aurea, Paris, 1348

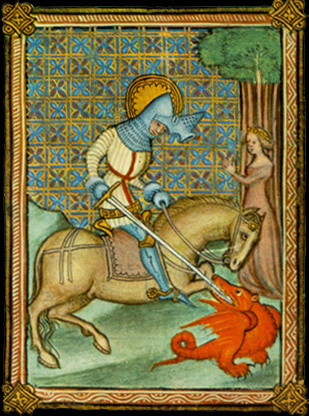
Book of Hours (c. 1380?)

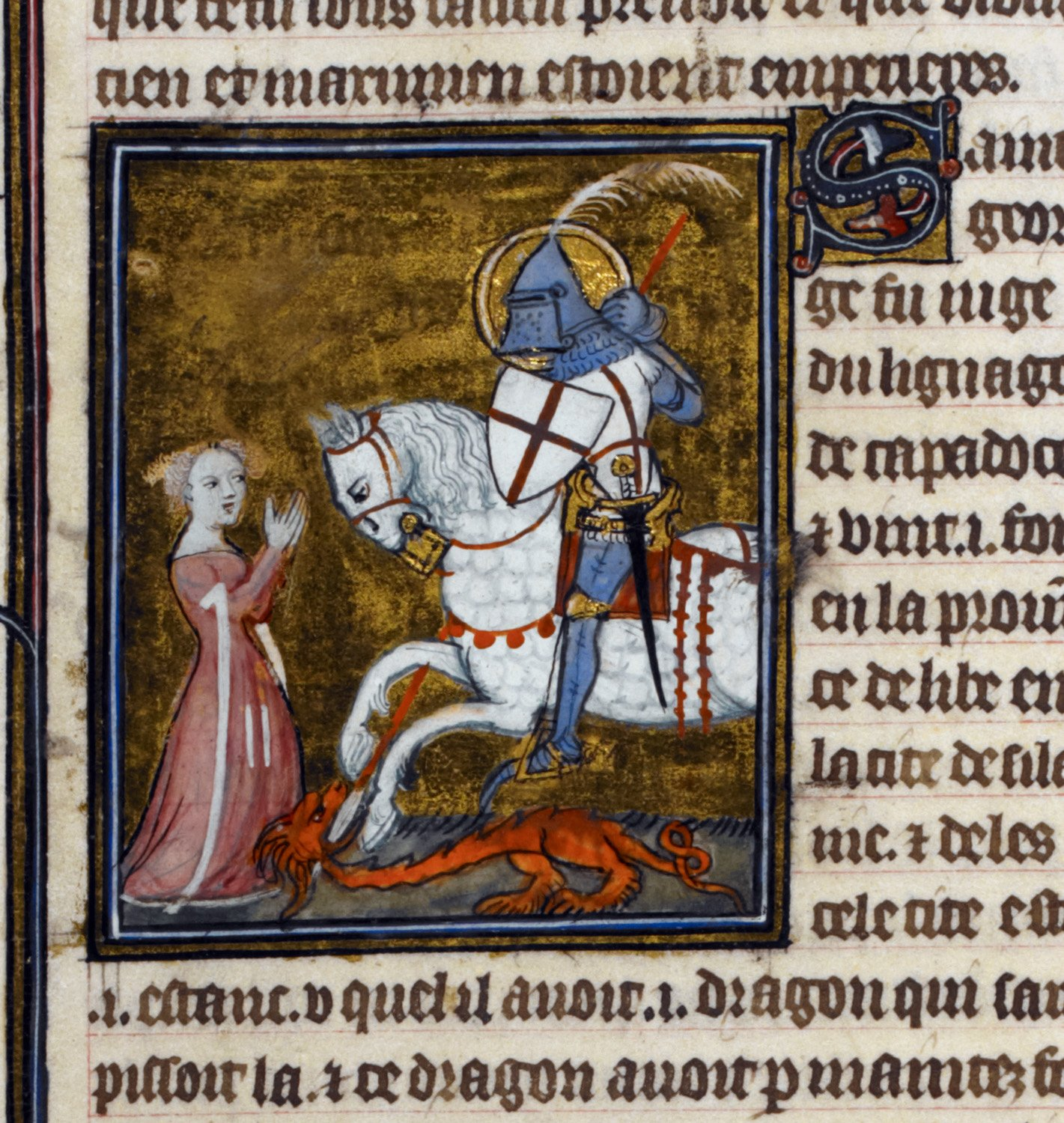
Miniature from a manuscript of Legenda Aurea, Paris, 1382

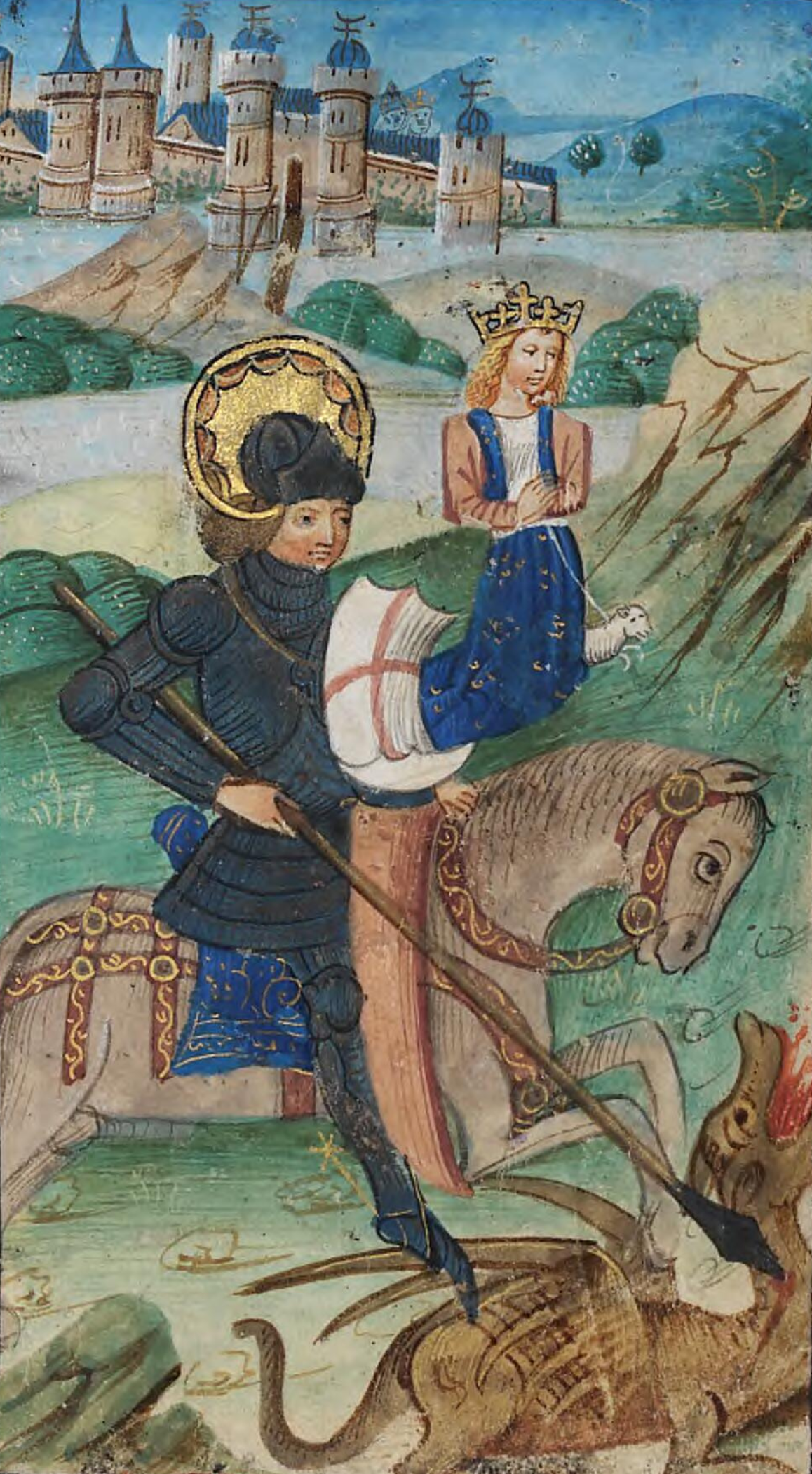
De Grey Hours (c. 1400)

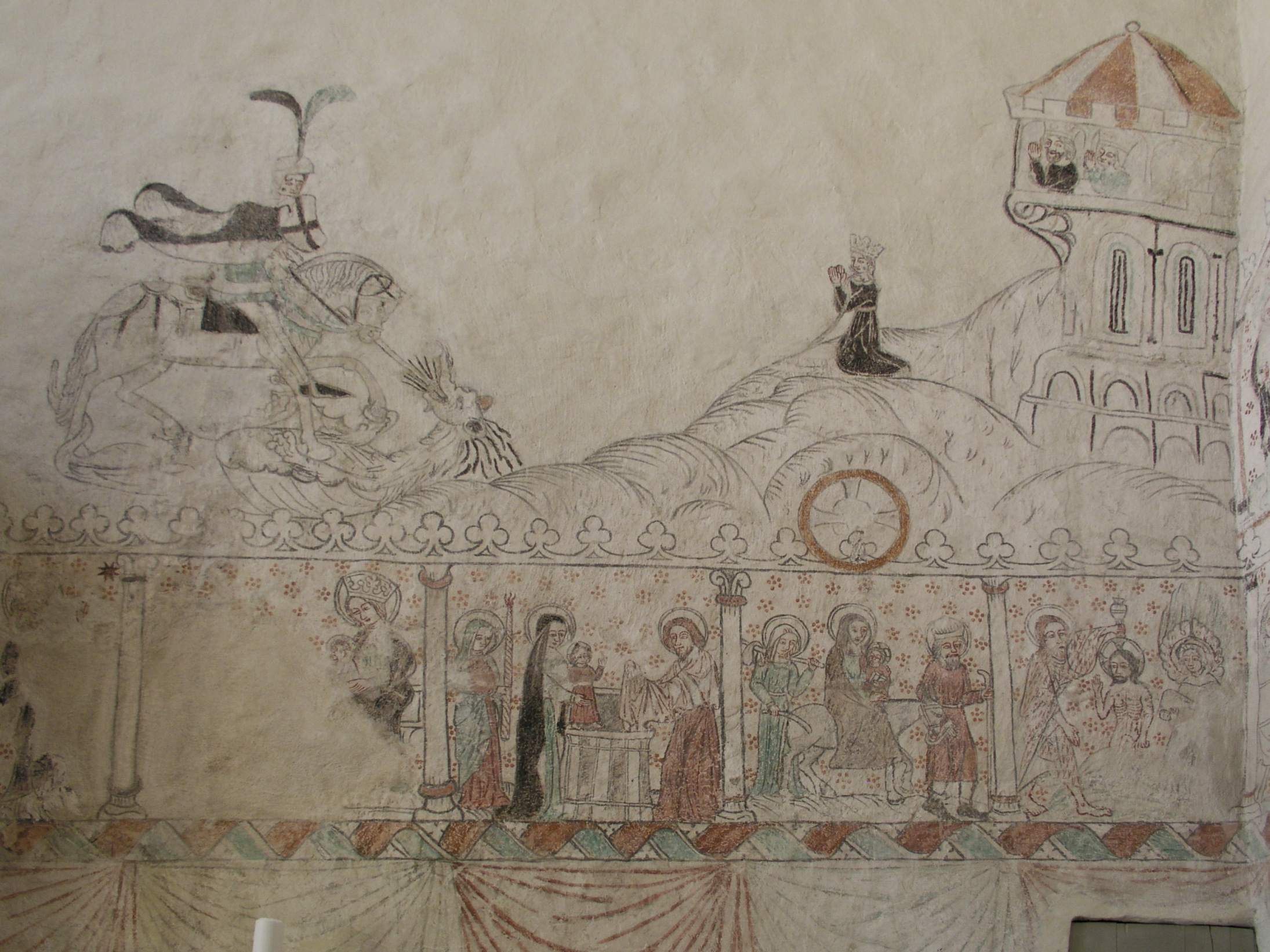
Fresco of the full legend, Anga Church, Gotland, Sweden (mid 15th century)

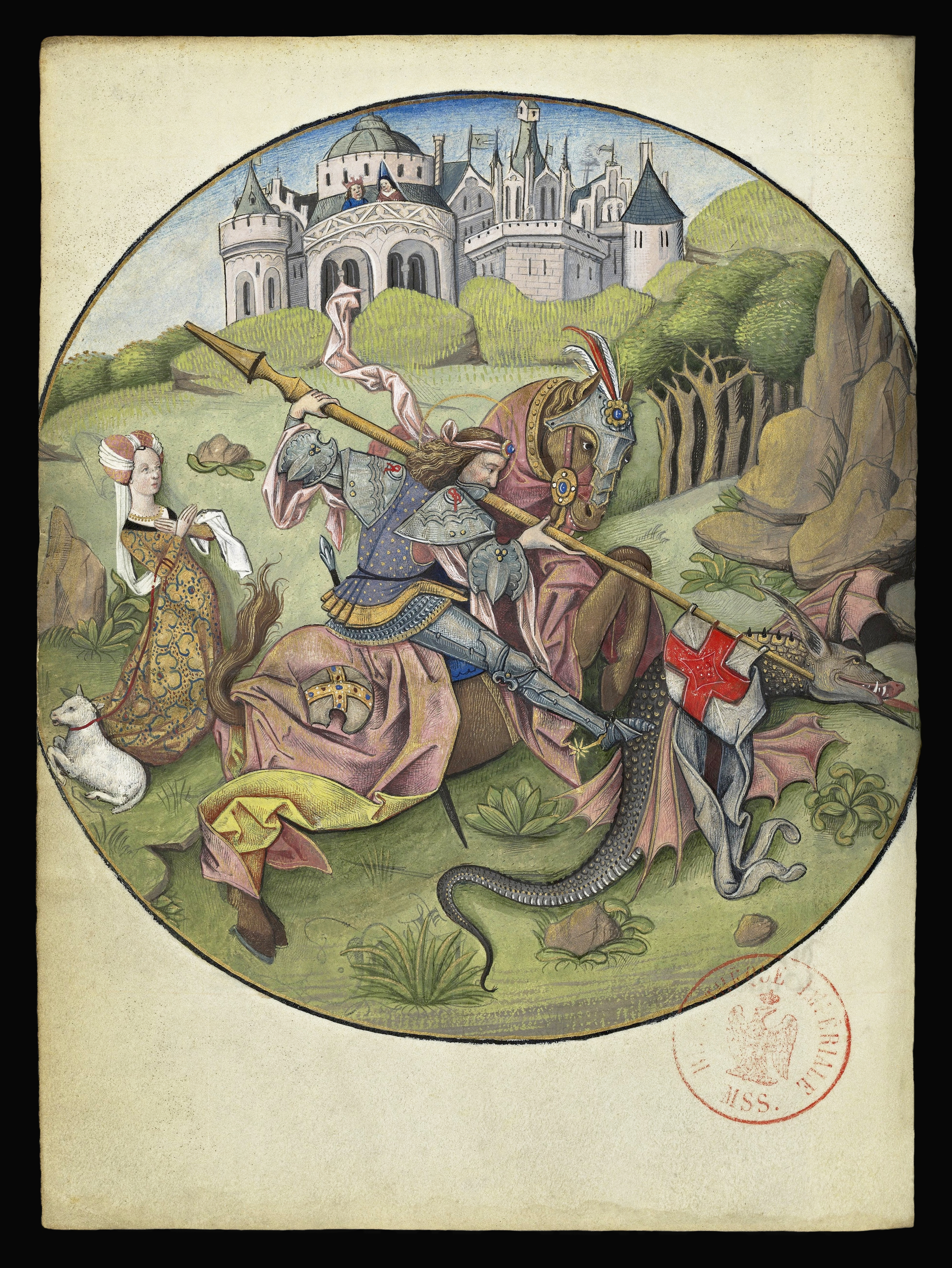
Miniature from Heures de Charles d'Angoulême, Cognac, France, f.53v (1475–1500)

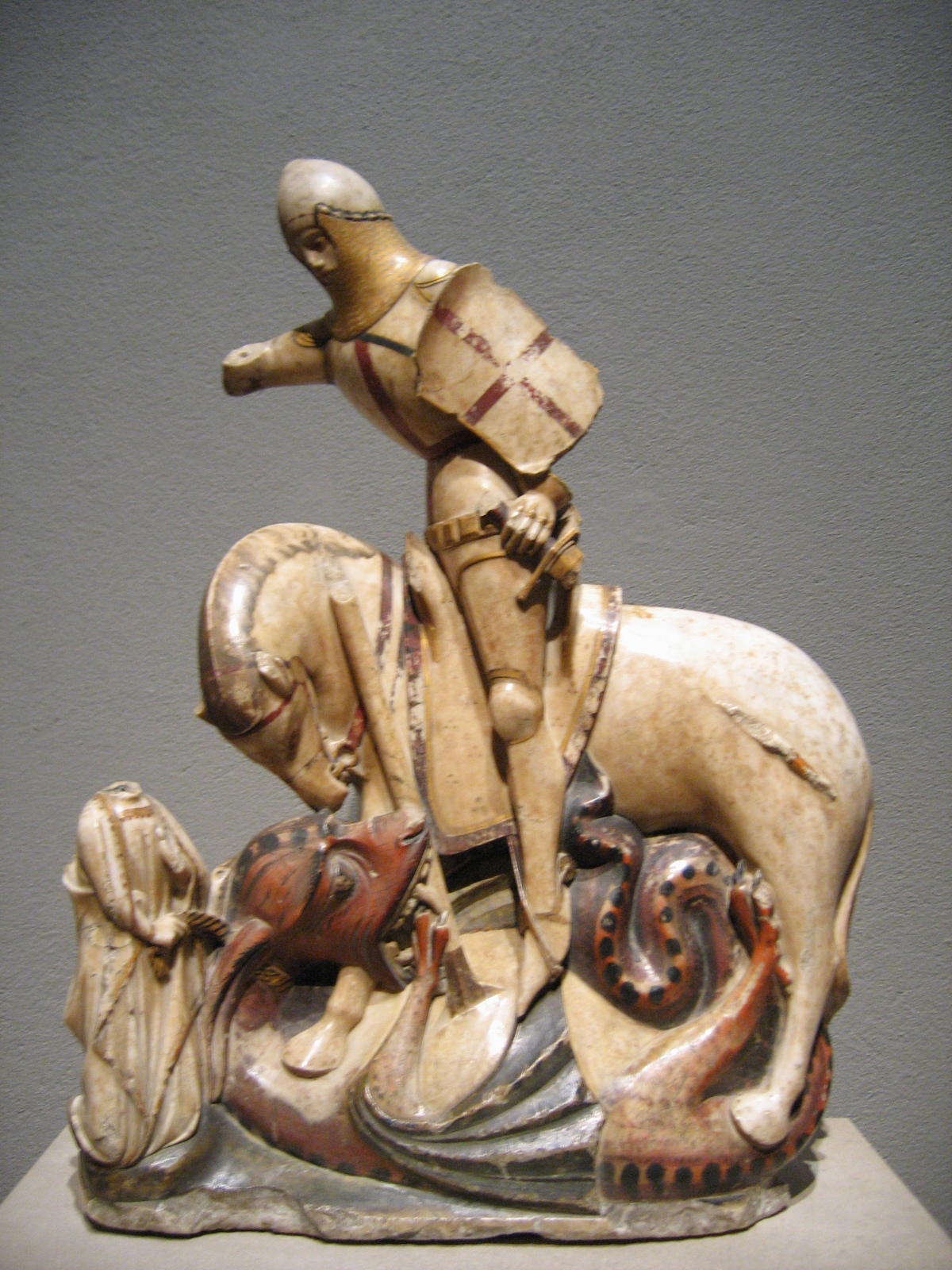
Saint George and the Dragon, tinted alabaster, English, c. 1375–1420 (National Gallery of Art, Washington)

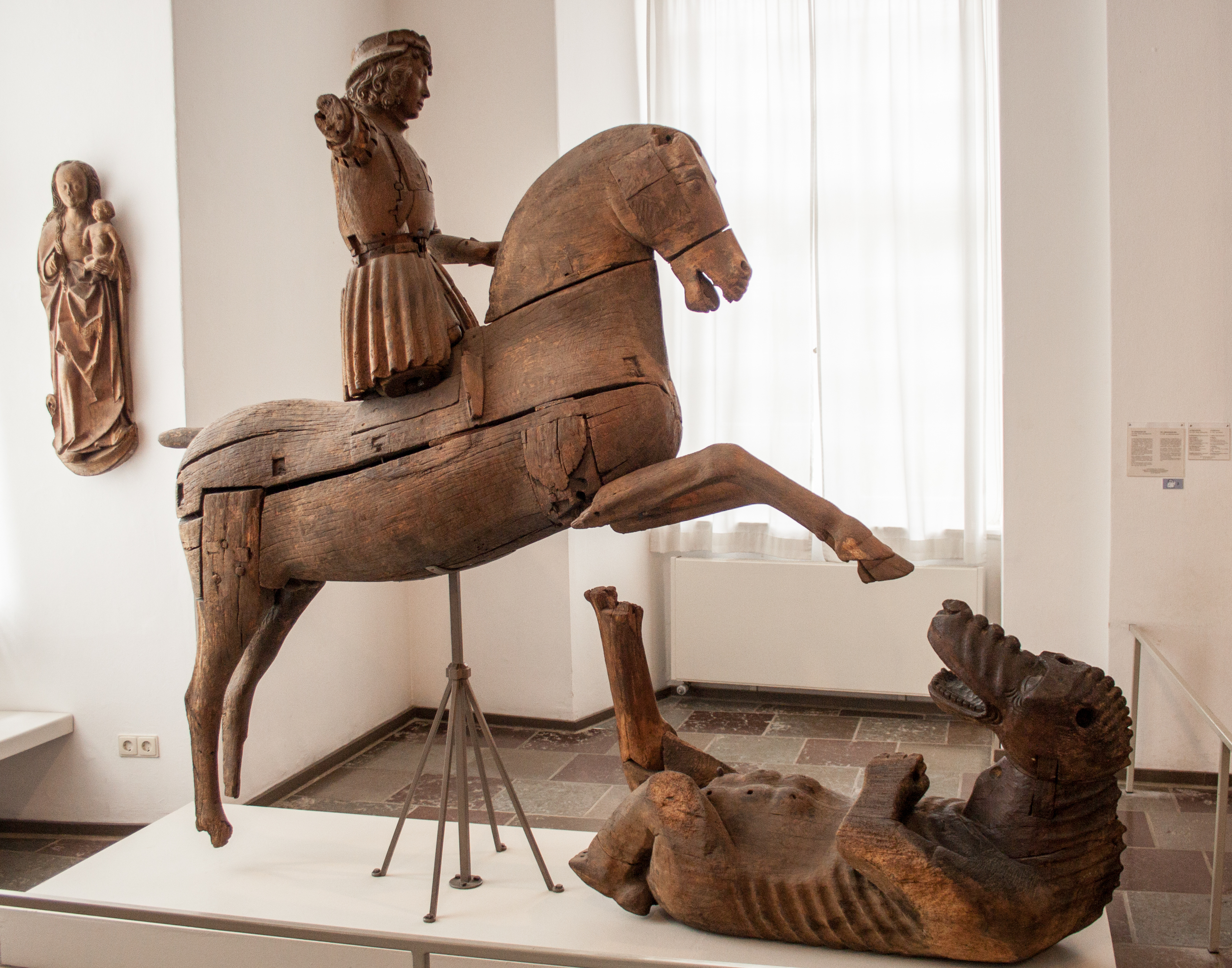
Wooden sculpture, c. 1500, Gottorf Castle

=== Renaissance ===
- Donatello, Saint George, c. 1417. Bargello, Florence, Italy.
- Paolo Uccello, Saint George and the Dragon, c. 1470. National Gallery, London.
- Giovanni Bellini, Saint George Fighting the Dragon, c. 1471. Pesaro altarpiece.
- Lieven van Lathem, Saint George and the Dragon (c. 1471)
- Bernt Notke, Saint George and the Dragon, Storkyrkan in Stockholm, c. 1484–1489.
- Andrea della Robbia, terracotta, c. 1490
- Albrecht Dürer, woodcut, 1501/4
- Raphael (Raffaello Santi), Saint George, 1504. Oil on wood. Louvre, Paris, France.
- Raphael (Raffaello Santi), Saint George and the Dragon, 1504–1506. Oil on wood. National Gallery of Art, Washington, D.C., United States.
- Albrecht Altdorfer, Forest Landscape with Saint George Fighting the Dragon, 1510
- Tintoretto (Jacopo Robusti), Saint George and the Dragon, 1555.
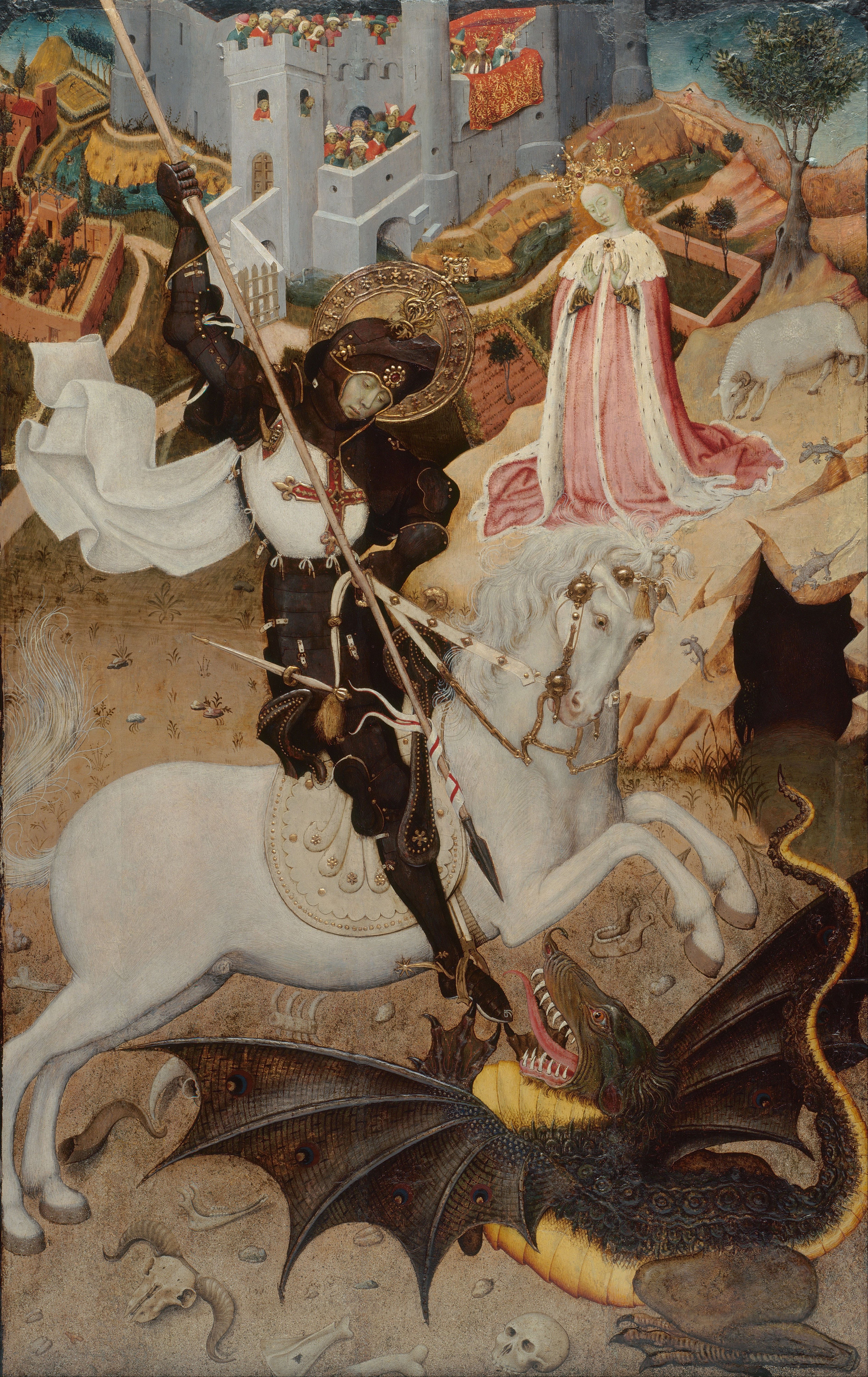
Saint George and the Dragon, painting by Martorell in the Art Institute of Chicago (1435)

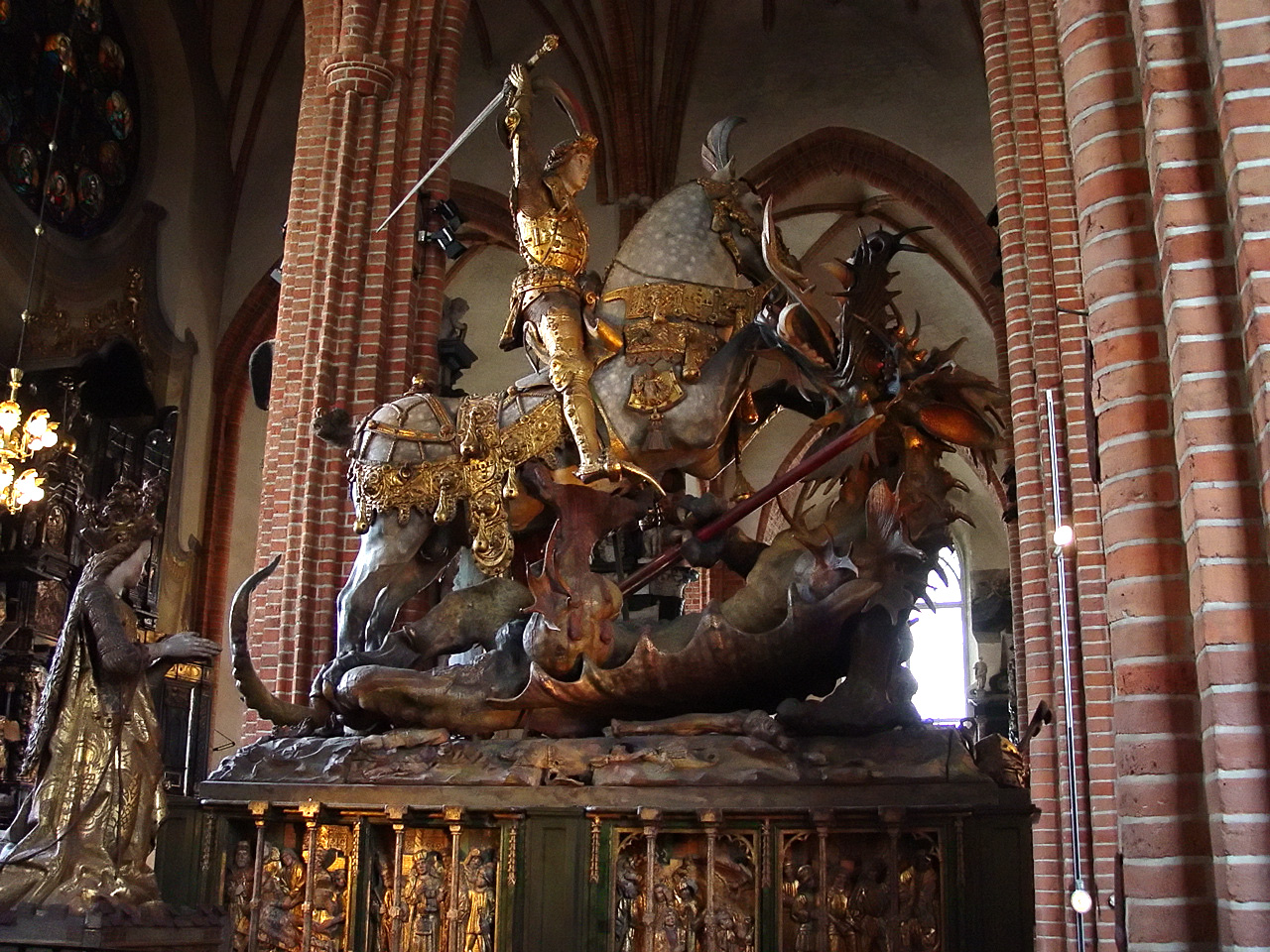
Saint George and the Dragon, wood carving by Bernt Notke in Stockholm's Storkyrkan (1470s)

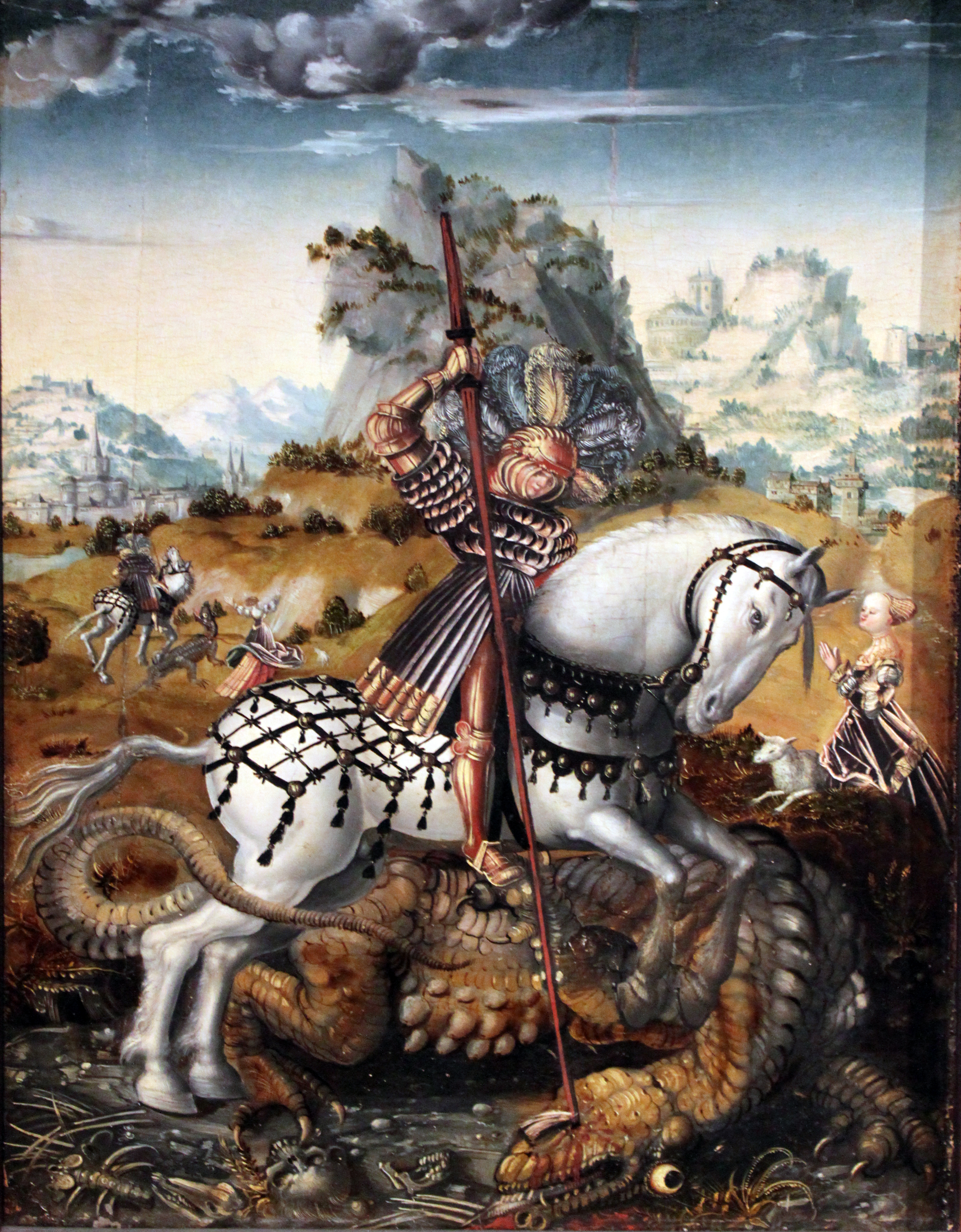
Saint George on Horseback, Master of the Döbeln Altarpiece, 1511/13, Hamburger Kunsthalle

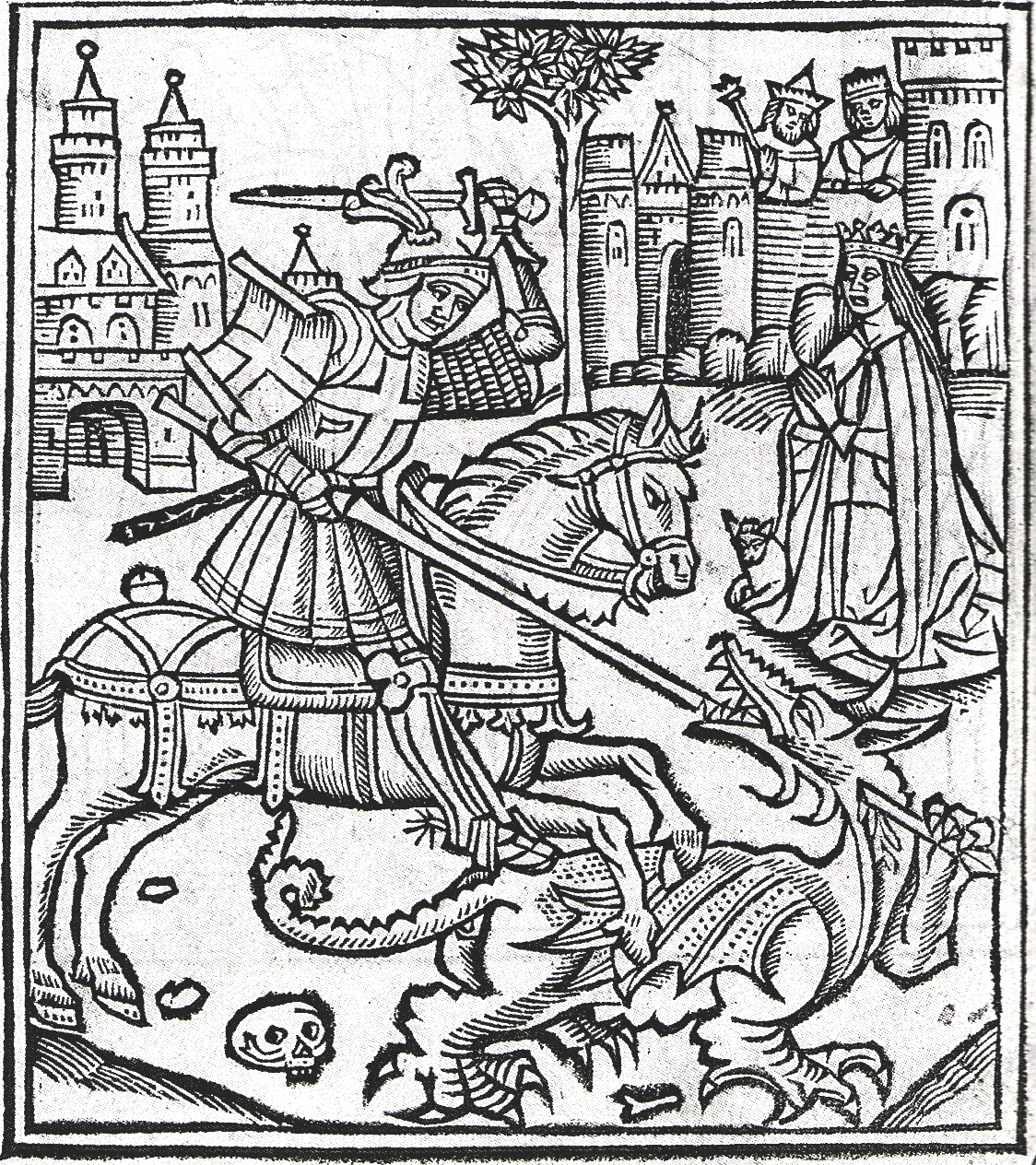
Woodcut frontispiece of Alexander Barclay, Lyfe of Seynt George (Westminster, 1515)

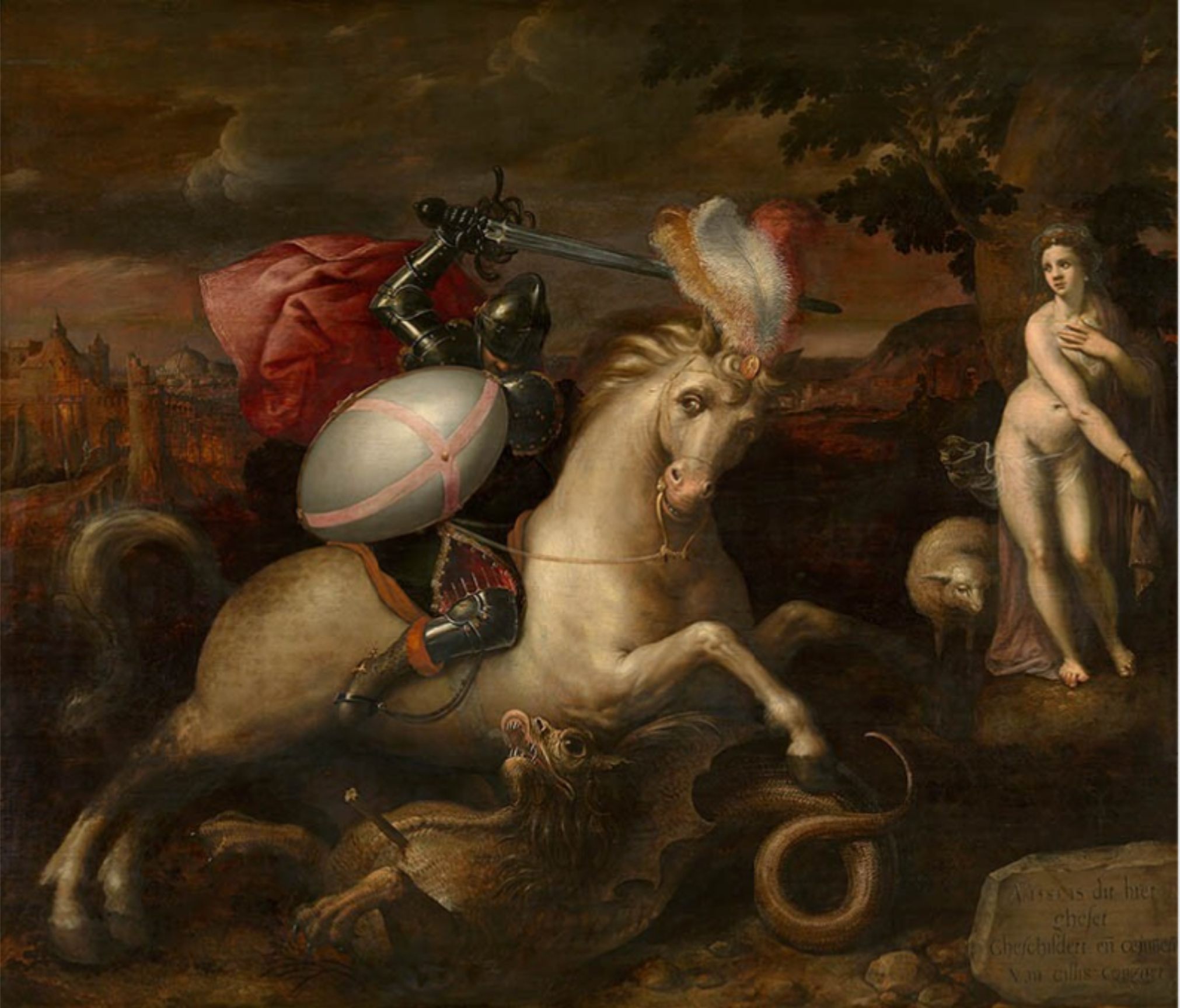
Gillis Coignet – Saint George the Great (1581)

=== Early modern and modern art ===
Paintings

- Peter Paul Rubens, Saint George and the Dragon, 1620.
- Salvator Rosa, Saint George and the Dragon
- Mattia Preti, Saint George Triumphant over the Dragon, 1678, at St George's Basilica, Victoria.
- Edward Burne-Jones, Saint George and the Dragon, 1866.
- Gustave Moreau, Saint George and the Dragon, c. 1870. Oil on canvas. The National Gallery, London.
- Briton Rivière, Saint George and the Dragon, c. 1914.
- Uroš Predić, St George Killing the Dragon, 1930.
- Giorgio de Chirico, Saint George Killing the Dragon, 1940.

Sculptures

- The sculptures which form part of the clock of Liberty's store in Regent Street, London (19th century).
- Sir Joseph Edgar Boehm, Saint George and the Dragon, bronze, State Library of Victoria, 1889
- Salvador Dalí, Saint George and the Dragon, Open Air Museum in Cosenza, 1947
- Alexander Fisher, Saint George and the Dragon, Stanway War Memorial, Stanway, Gloucestershire, England, 1920
- Edward Seago, Saint George and the Dragon, silver, automobile mascot used for the British monarch's cars, 1952.
- Zurab Tsereteli, sculpture in front of the Victory Monument at Victory Park, Moscow, 1995
- Zurab Tsereteli, Saint George Statue, Tbilisi, 2005
- Marcus Canning and Christian de Vietri, Ascalon, abstract sculpture in front of St George's Cathedral, Perth, 2011

Mosaic

- Edward Poynter, Saint George for England, 1869. Central Lobby in the Palace of Westminster.
- Sergey Chekhonin, Sergey Vasilyevich Gerasimov, Central maiolica panel about the battle of Saint George the Victorious with the Serpent 1911–1913, Moscow, Russia.
- Anatoly Alexandrovich Ostrogradsky, A small image of Saint George, with the plot of the fresco of the Church of St. George in Staraya Ladoga in a stylized icon case on the façade, above the main porches, the maiolica was made in 1911–1913, Moscow, Russia.

Engravings

- Benedetto Pistrucci, engraving for coin dies, 1817.
- On kopecks issued by the Central Bank of Russia.

Prints

- On banknotes issued by the Bank of England:
  - £1 note, 1917 until 1933, on obverse, with portrait of George V; 1928 until 1960, on reverse, duplicated.
  - £5 note, 1957 until 1967, on obverse, with portrait of Britannia.
  - £20 note, 1970 until 1993, on obverse, with portrait of Elizabeth II.
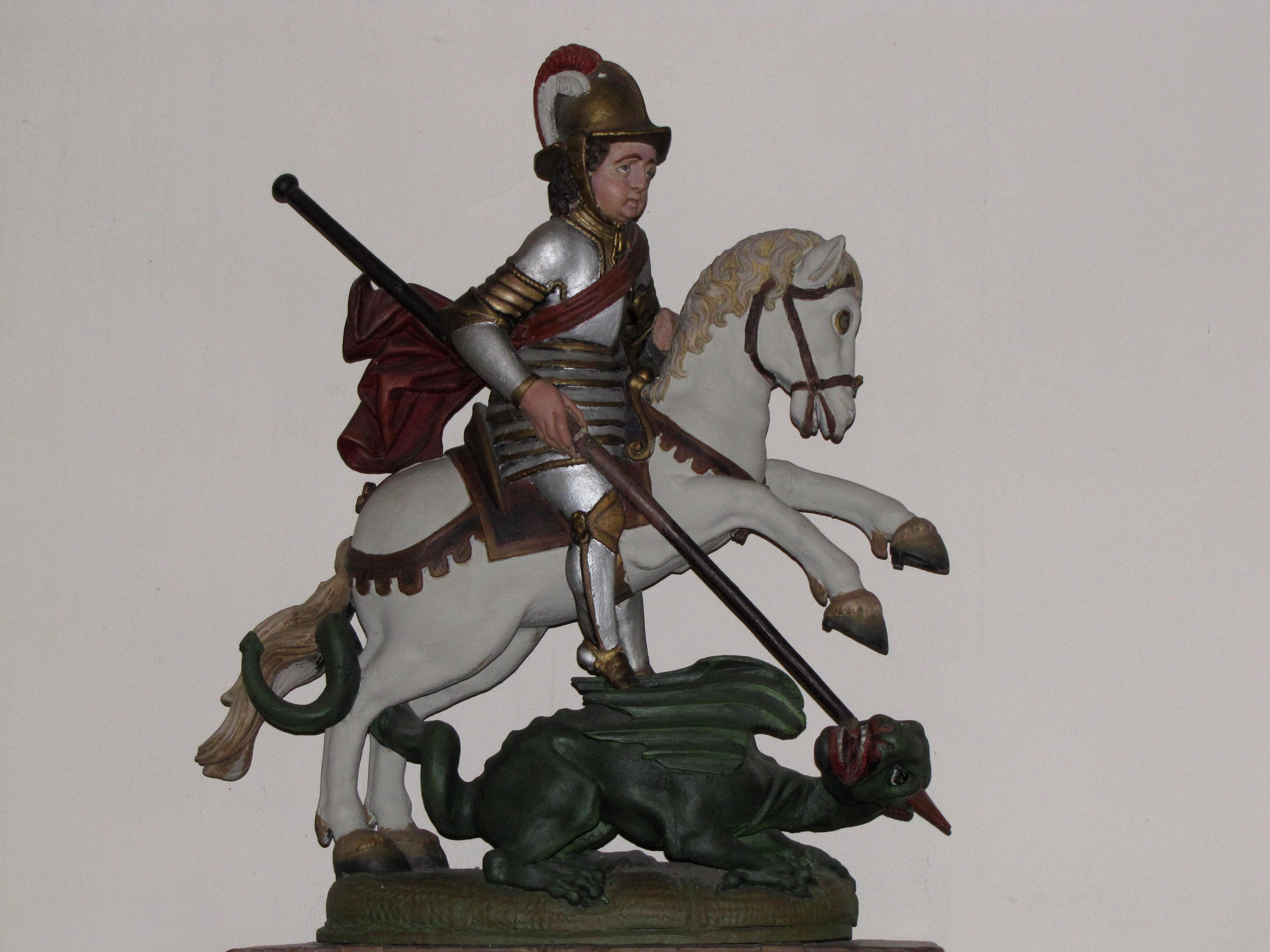
17th-century statue in Église Saint-Georges de Châtenois, France

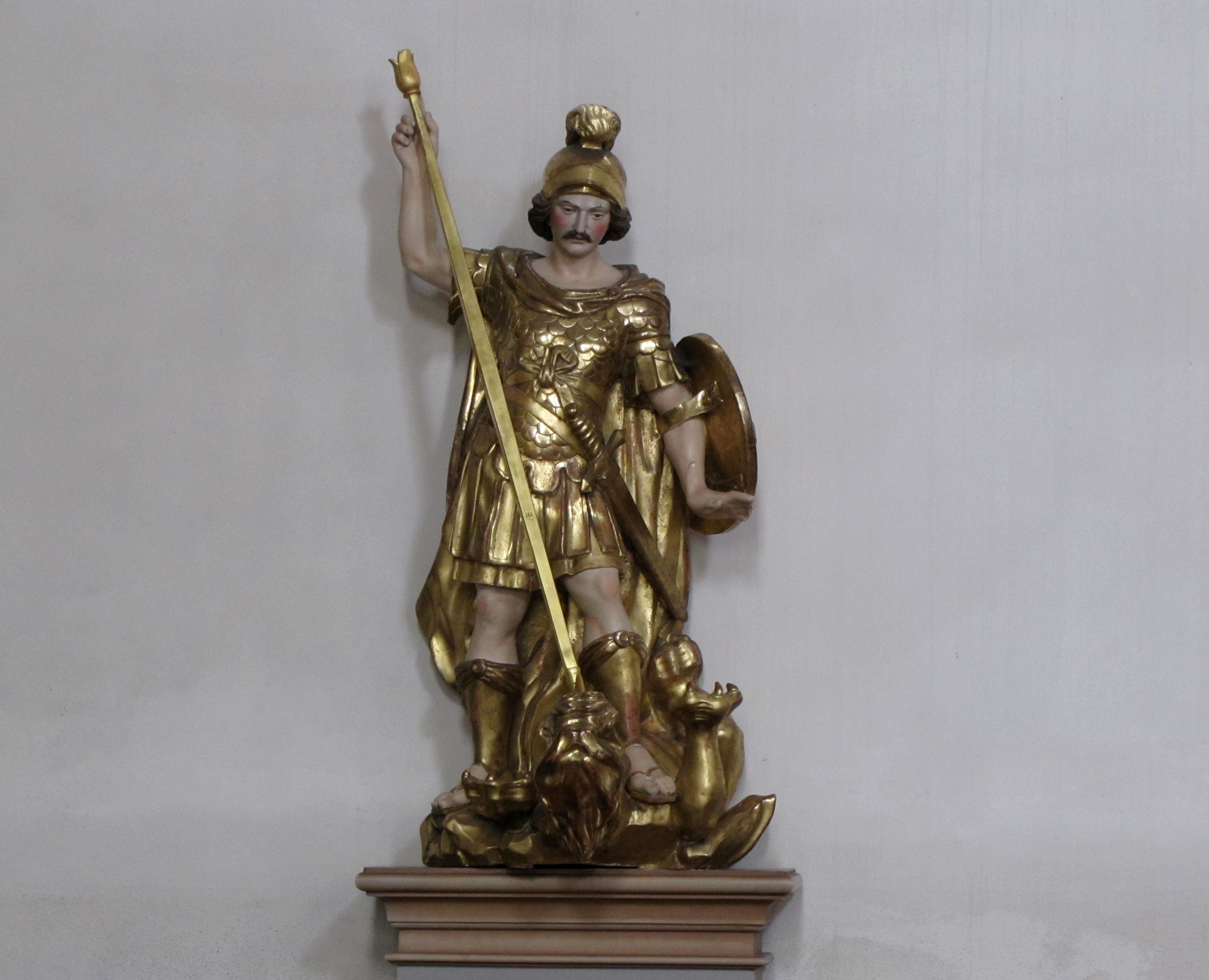
18th-century statue in Église Saint-Georges de Châtenois, France

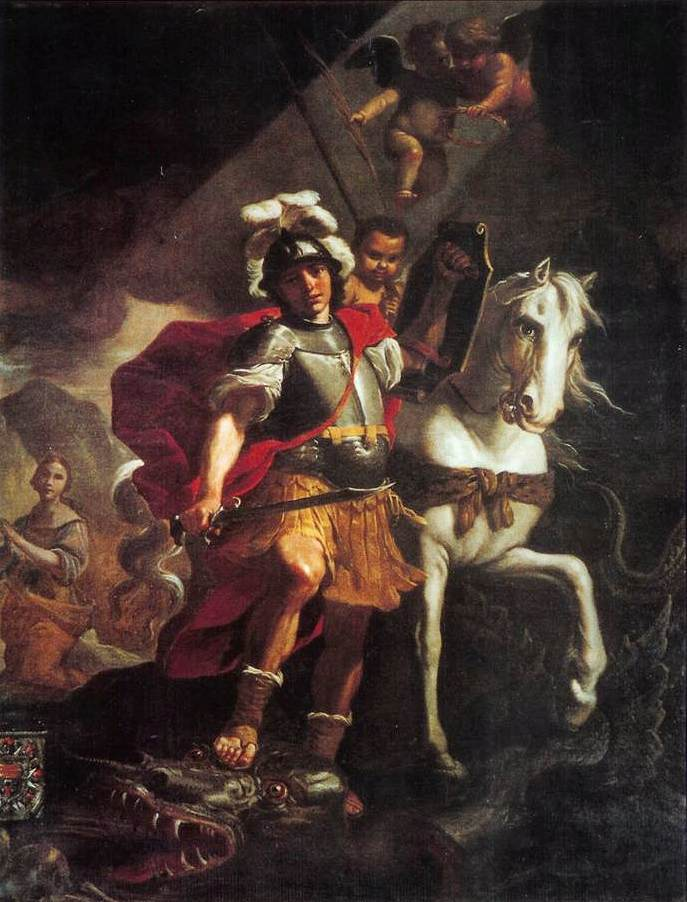
Saint George and the Dragon, by Mattia Preti (1678), in Gozo, Malta

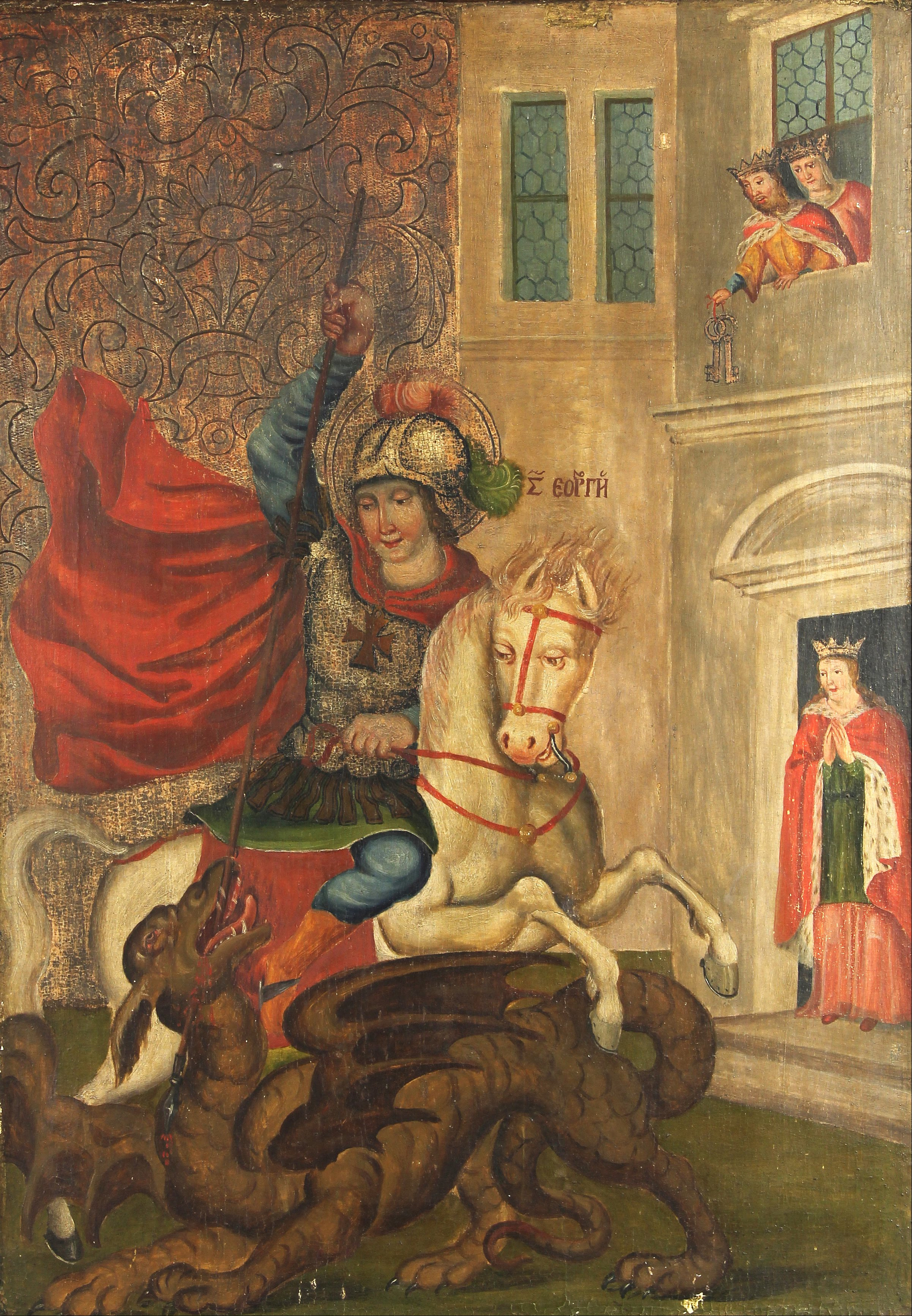
Unknown painter from Ukraine, 18th century

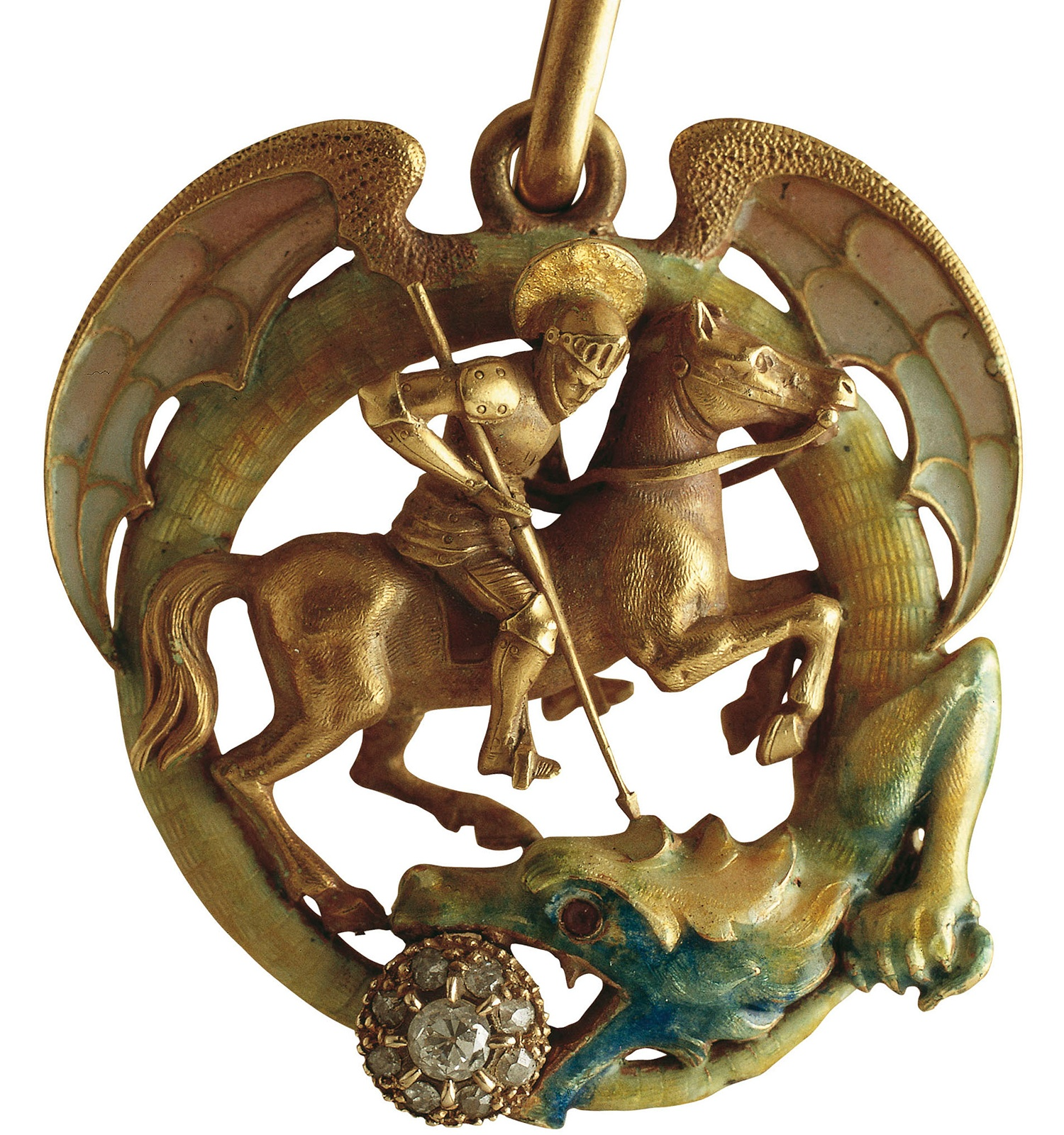
Pendant with Saint George by Lluís Masriera i Rosés (1902), Barcelona

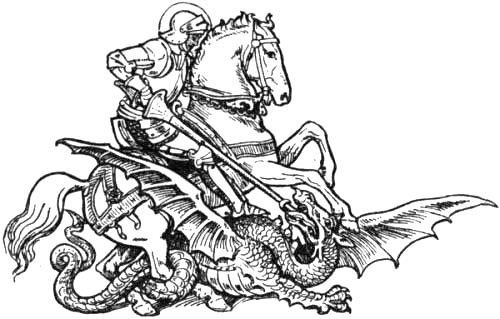
Print of St. George and the Dragon by John Vinycomb, in Fictitious and Symbolic Creatures in Art (1906)

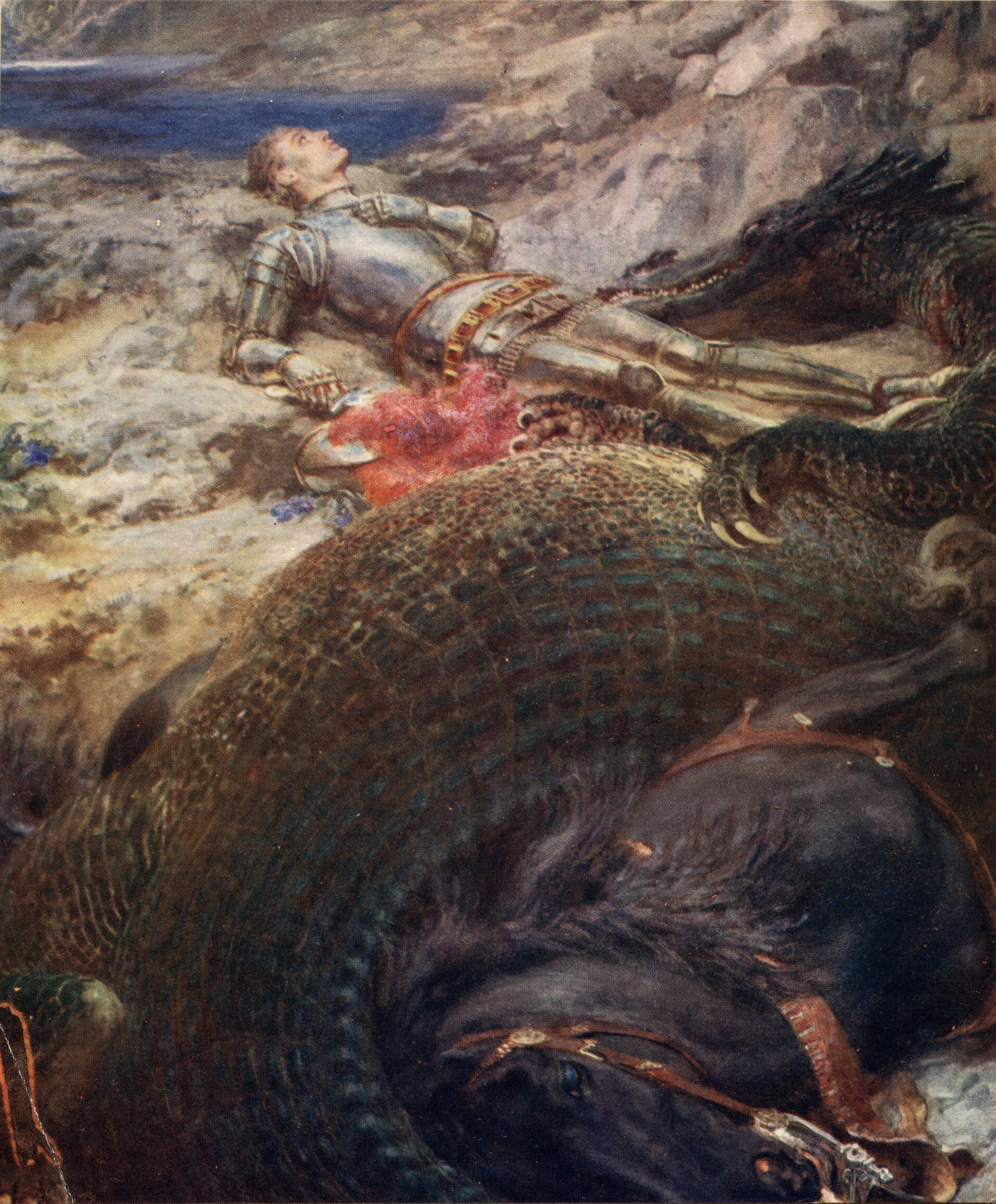
St. George and the Dragon by Briton Reviere (c. 1914)

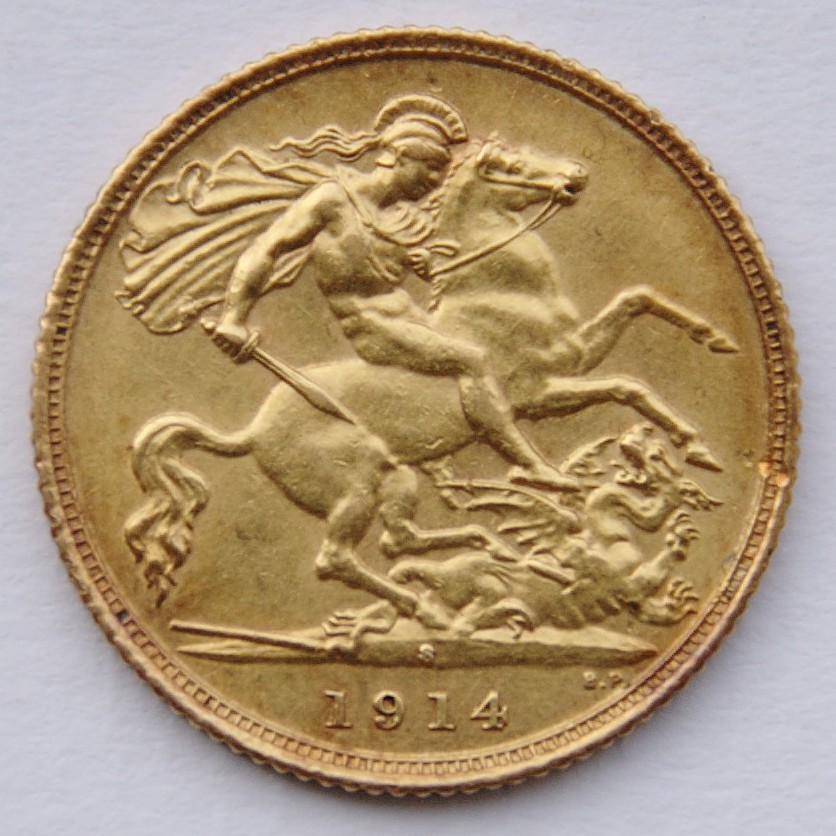
1914 sovereign with Benedetto Pistrucci's engraving

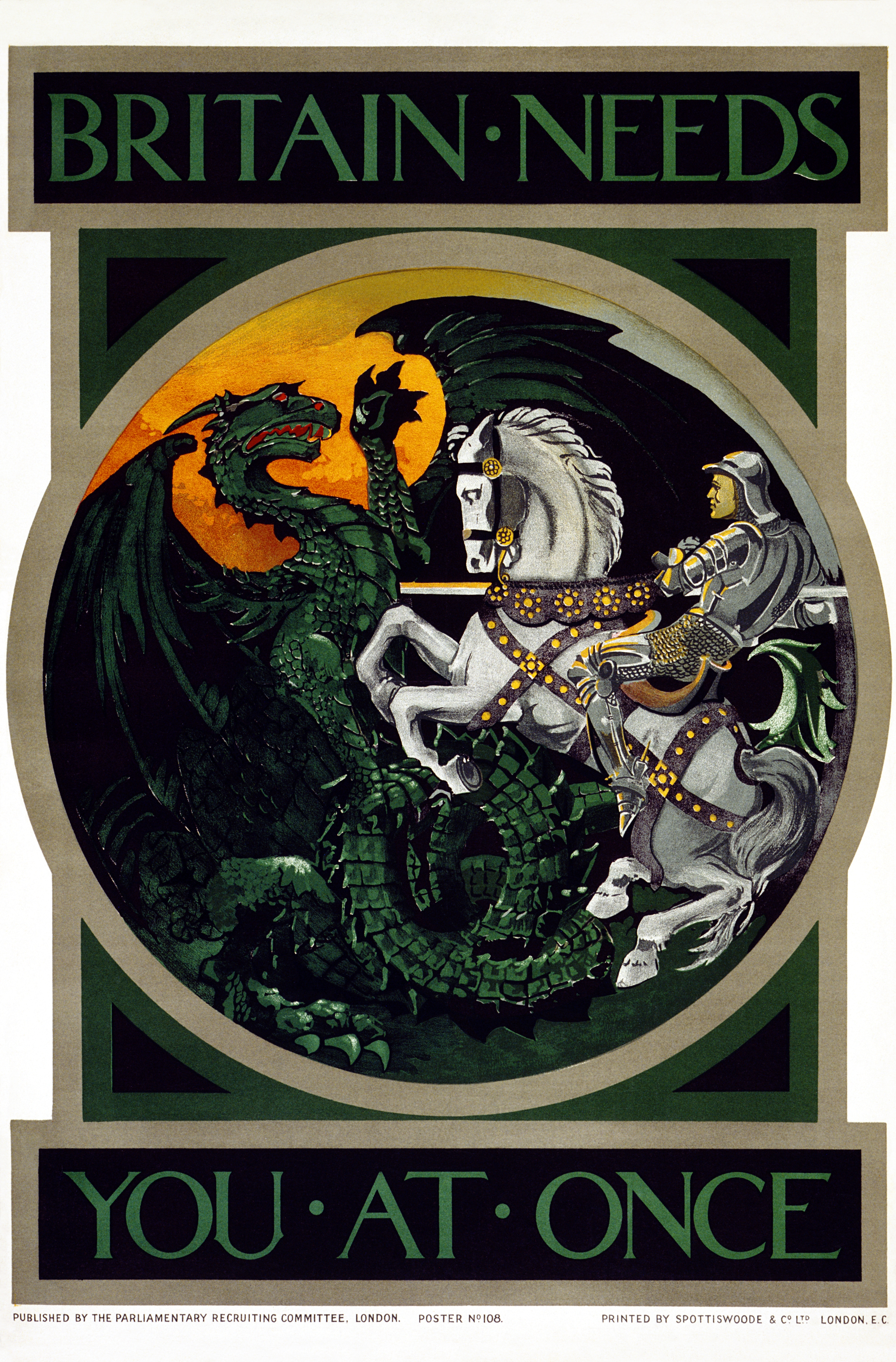
WWI British recruitment poster

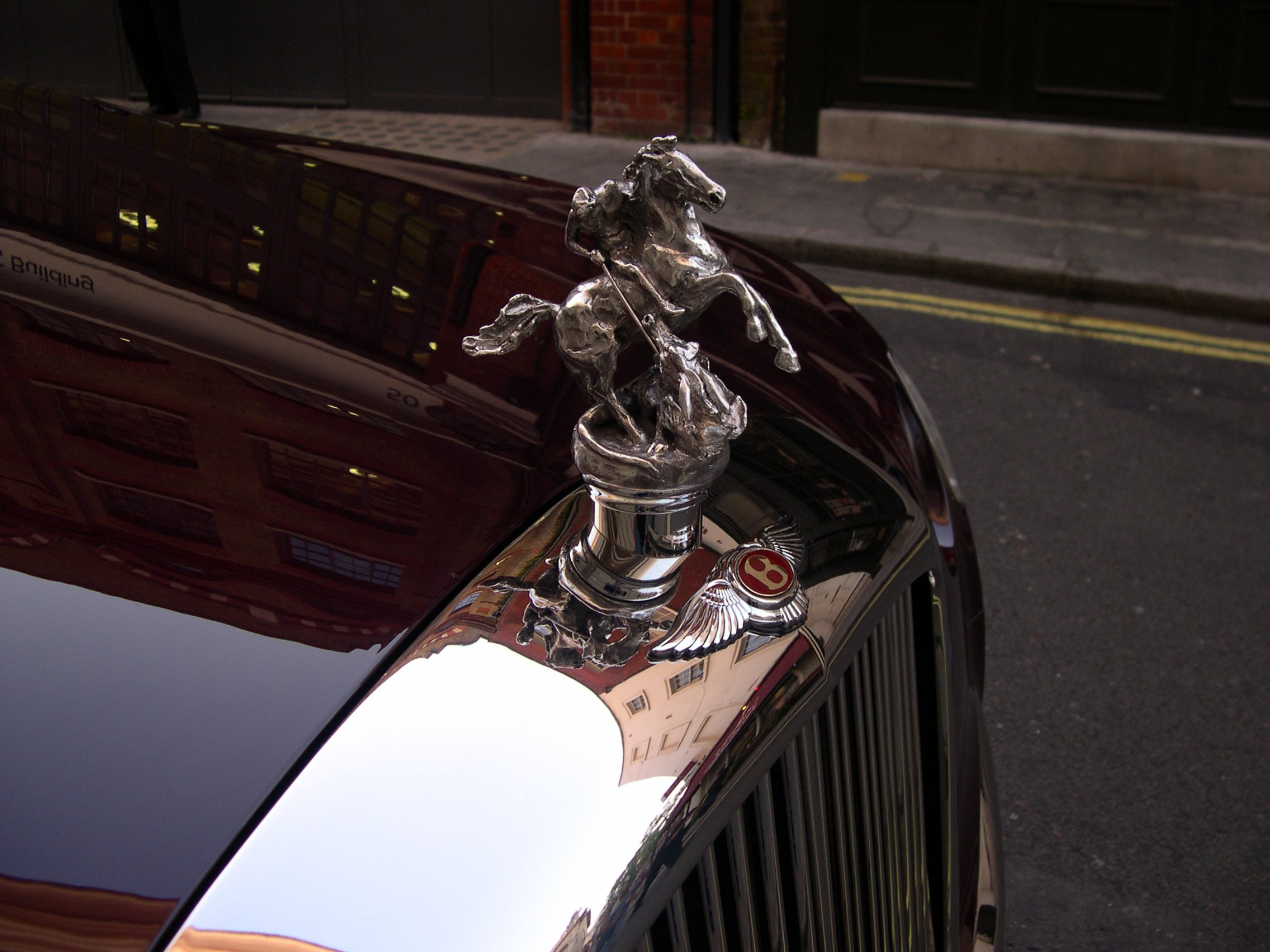
Edward Seago's St. George and the Dragon automobile mascot used by the British monarch (1952)

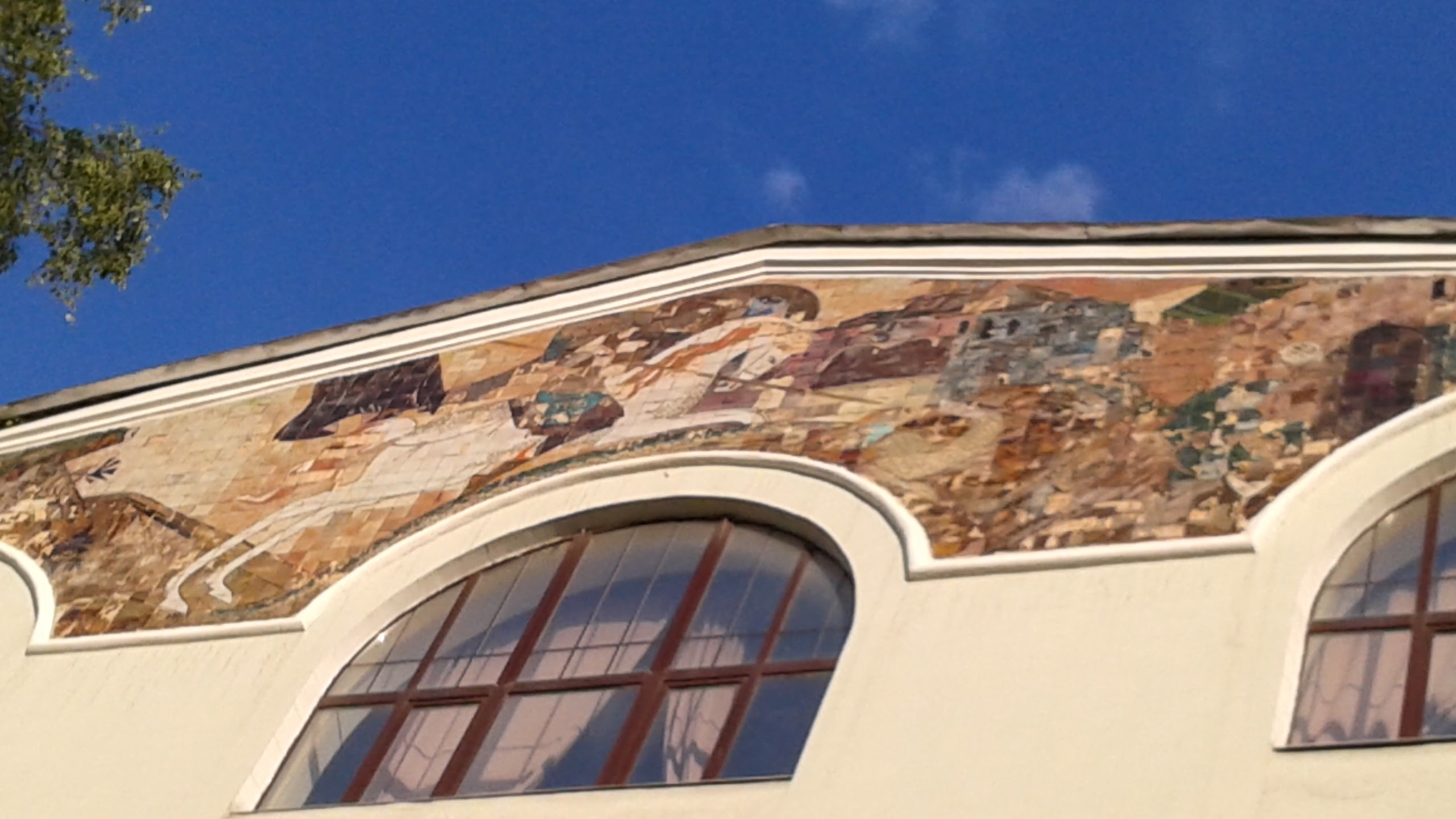
Central maiolica panel about the battle of St. George the Victorious with the Serpent 1911–1913, artists Sergey Chekhonin, Sergey Vasilyevich Gerasimov

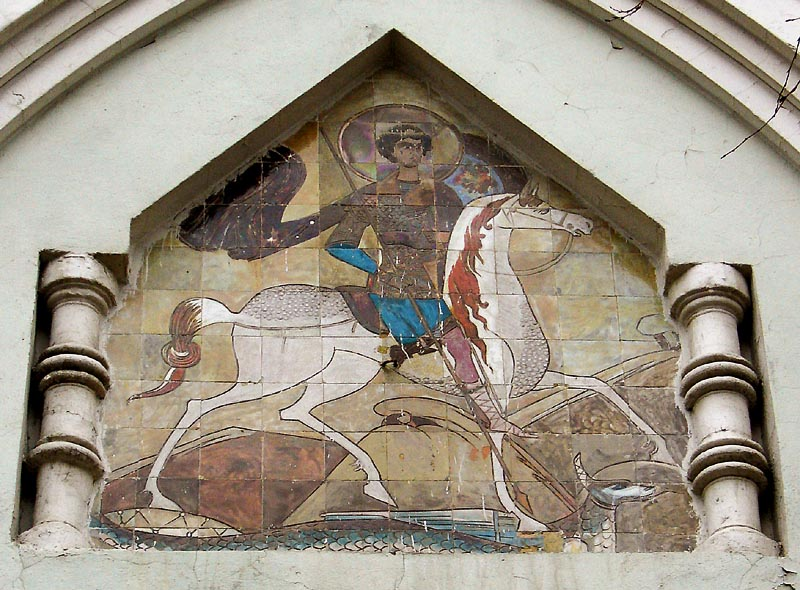
A small image of St. George, with the plot of the fresco of the Church of St. George in Staraya Ladoga in a stylized icon case on the facade, above the main porches, the maiolica was made in 1911–1913 by Anatoly Alexandrovich Ostrogradsky.

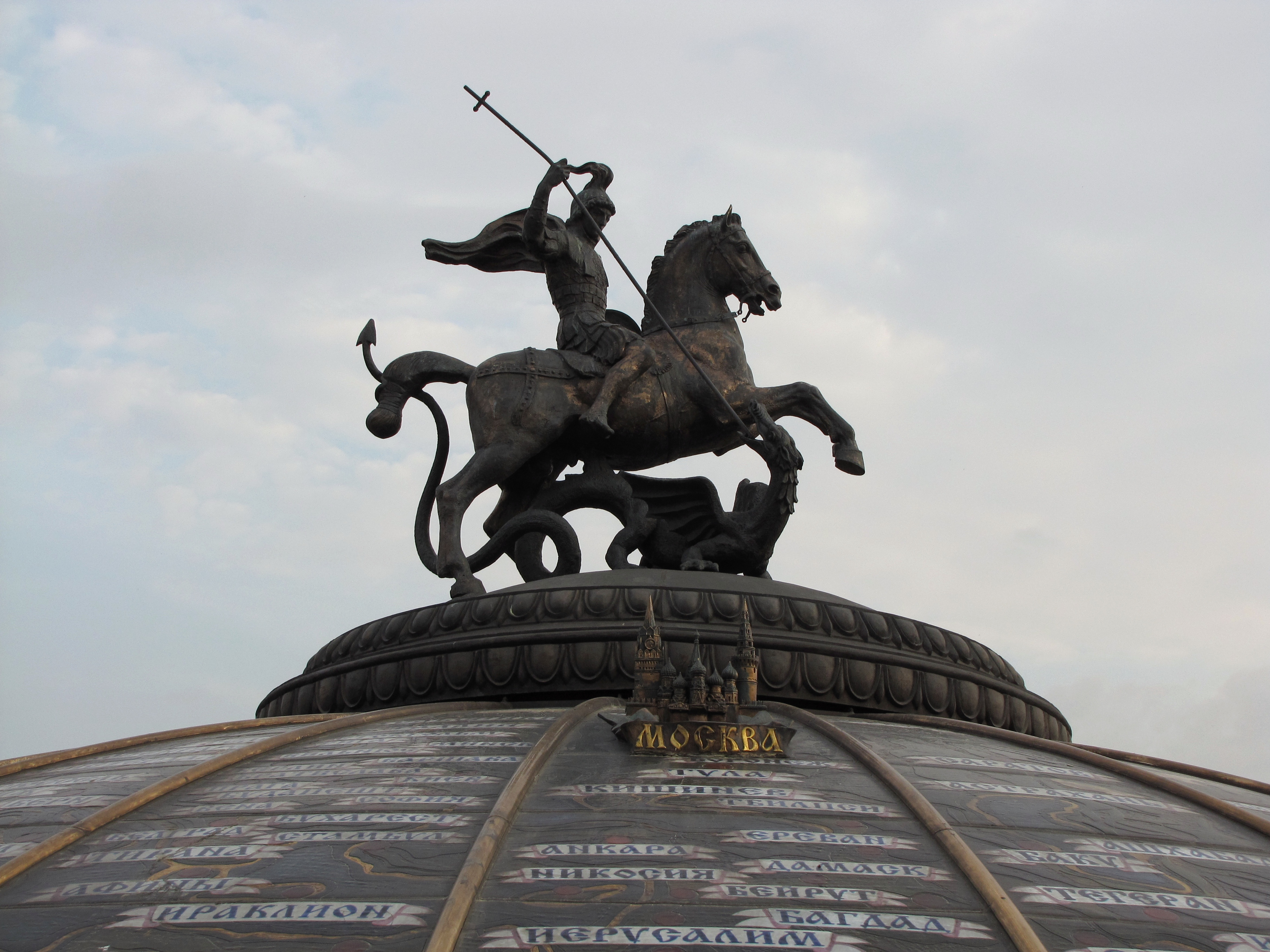
Zurab Tsereteli's St. George and the Dragon on the top of the Okhotny Ryad shopping center (1997) in Moscow, Russia

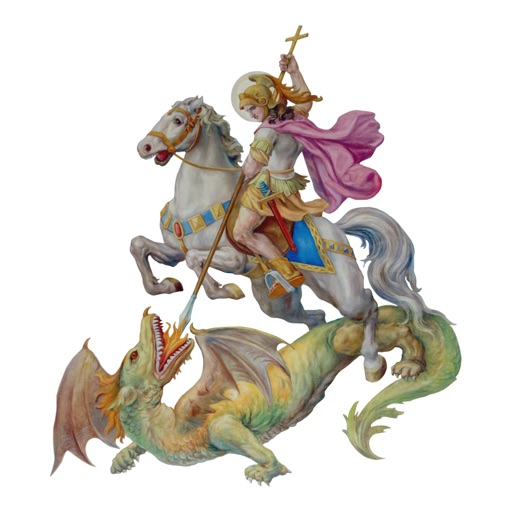
Saint George Orthodox Church of Montreal 20th Century Mural

== Literary and other media adaptations ==
Edmund Spenser expands on the Saint George and the Dragon story in Book I of the Fairy Queen, initially referring to the hero as the Redcross Knight. William Shakespeare refers to Saint George and the Dragon in Richard III ( Advance our standards, set upon our foes Our ancient world of courage fair St. George Inspire us with the spleen of fiery dragons act V, sc. 3), Henry V ( The game's afoot: follow your spirit, and upon this charge cry 'God for Harry, England, and Saint George!' act III, sc. 1), and also in King Lear (act I).

A 17th-century broadside ballad paid homage to the feat of George's dragon slaying. Titled "St. George and the Dragon", the ballad considers the importance of Saint George in relation to other heroes of epic and Romance, ultimately concluding that all other heroes and figures of epic or romance pale in comparison to the feats of George.

The Banner of St George by Edward Elgar is a ballad for chorus and orchestra, words by Shapcott Wensley (1879). The 1898 Dream Days by Kenneth Grahame includes a chapter entitled "The Reluctant Dragon", in which an elderly Saint George and a benign dragon stage a mock battle to satisfy the townsfolk and get the dragon introduced into society. Later made into a film by Walt Disney Productions, and set to music by John Rutter as a children's operetta.

Henry James's 1888 novella, The Lesson of the Master, is a loose retelling of the legend, set in the late 19th century.

In 1935 Stanley Holloway recorded a humorous retelling of the tale as St. George and the Dragon written by Weston and Lee. In the 1950s, Stan Freberg and Daws Butler wrote and performed St. George and the Dragon-Net (a spoof of the tale and of Dragnet) for Freberg's radio show. The story's recording became the first comedy album to sell over a million copies.

Margaret Hodges retold the legend in a 1984 children's book (Saint George and the Dragon) with Caldecott Medal-winning illustrations by Trina Schart Hyman.

The Forever Knights, a group of antagonists in the Ben 10 franchise, are revealed in the third series Ben 10: Ultimate Alien to have been founded by Sir George. In the past, George fought Dagon, an extradimensional entity who assumed the form of a dragon, and cut out his heart. In the present day, George resurfaces to combat the return of Dagon, only to be killed in battle with Dagon.

Samantha Shannon describes her 2019 novel The Priory of the Orange Tree as a "feminist retelling" of Saint George and the Dragon.

Bladee's 2025 EP Ste The Beautiful Martyr 1st Attempt and subsequent 2026 album Sulfur Surfer are both inspired by the myth of Saint George and the Dragon, heavily utilizing the themes of princess rescue, dragon fighting and spiritual martyrdom.

== Heraldry and vexillology ==
=== Coats of arms ===
Reggio Calabria used Saint George and the dragon in its coat of arms since at least 1757, derived from earlier (15th-century) iconography used on the city seal. Saint George and the dragon has been depicted in the coat of arms of Moscow since the late 18th century, and in the coat of arms of Georgia since 1991 (based on a coat of arms introduced in 1801 for Georgia within the Russian Empire).

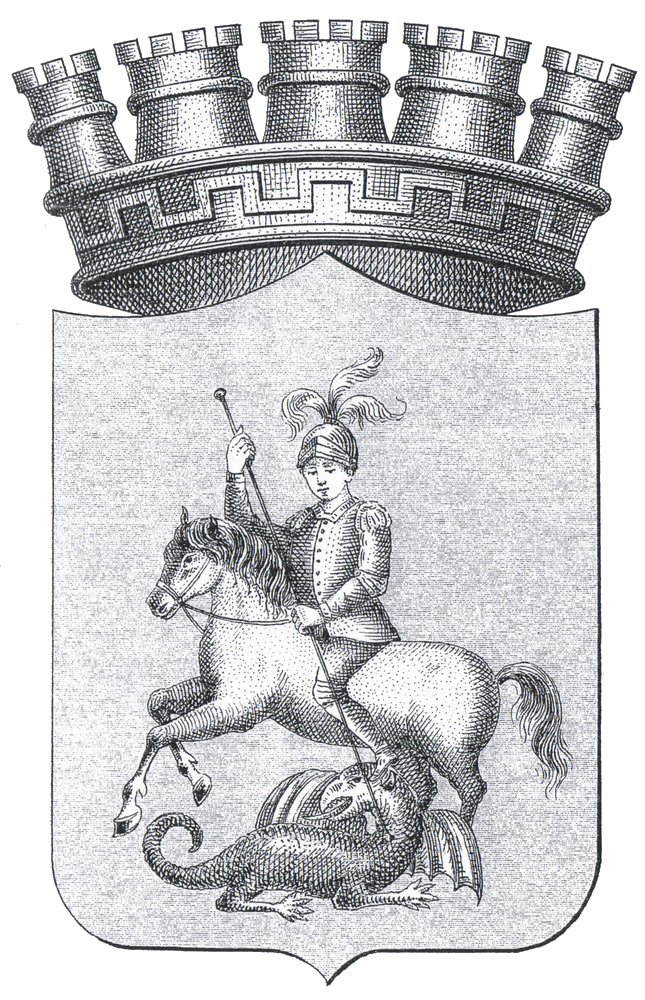
Coat of arms of Reggio Calabria (1896)

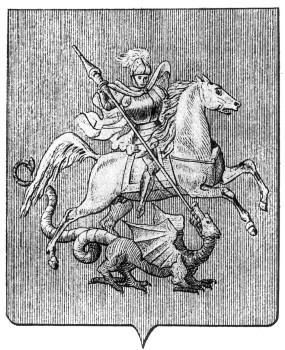
Coat of arms of Moscow (1781)

Coat of arms of Moscow (1993 design)

Coat of arms of Russia (1993)

Coat of arms of Kyiv Oblast (1999)

Coat of arms of Georgia (2004)

The royal arms of Aragon from the Inventory of King Martin (c.1400)

Provincial coats of arms

- Kyiv Oblast, Ukraine (1999)
- Moscow Oblast, Russia (2005)

Municipal coats of arms

- Australia: Hurstville
- Austria: Pitten, Sankt Georgen an der Gusen, Sankt Georgen an der Leys, Sankt Georgen an der Stiefing, Sankt Georgen im Attergau, Sankt Georgen ob Murau.
- Croatia: Kaštel Sućurac, Vis.
- Czech Republic: Brušperk.
- Denmark: Holstebro.
- France: Aydoilles, Couilly-Pont-aux-Dames, Ligsdorf, Maulan, Mussidan, Saint-Georges (Moselle), Saint-Georges-Armont, Saint-Georges-d'Espéranche, Saint-Georges-d'Oléron, Saint-Georges-d'Orques, Saint-Georges-de-Reintembault, Saint-Georges-du-Bois, Saint-Georges-du-Vièvre, Saint-Georges-sur-Baulche, Saint-Georges-sur-Loire, Saint-Jurs, Saorge, Sospel, Villeneuve-Saint-Georges.
- Germany: Bürgel, Hattingen, Mansfeld, Rittersbach, St. Georgen im Schwarzwald, Schwarzenberg.
- Hungary: Bácsszentgyörgy, Balatonszentgyörgy, Borsodszentgyörgy, Dunaszentgyörgy, Homokszentgyörgy, Pécsvárad, Szentgyörgyvár, Szentgyörgyvölgy, Tatárszentgyörgy.
- Italy: Reggio Calabria
- Lithuania: Marijampolė, Prienai, Varniai.
- Netherlands: Ridderkerk, Terborg.
- Poland: Brzeg Dolny, Dzierżoniów, Milicz, Ostróda.
- Romania: Suceava, Sfântu Gheorghe.
- Russia: Moscow
- Serbia: Srpski Krstur.
- Slovakia: Svätý Jur.
- Slovenia: Šenčur, Šentjur
- Spain: Alcalá de los Gazules, Golosalvo, Puentedura.
- Switzerland: Castiel, Corminboeuf, Kaltbrunn, Ruschein, Saint-George, Schlans, Stein am Rhein, Waltensburg/Vuorz.
- Ukraine: Holoby, Liuboml, Nizhyn, Taikury, Volodymyr, Vyshneve, Zbarazh.

=== Flags ===
Flag of England (Saint George's Flag)

Standard of Greek general Markos Botsaris

Imperial standard of Haile Selassie of Ethiopia (reverse)

Flag of Malta

=== Military insignia ===
- Regimental flags of the Hellenic Army (1864)
- Badge of the Royal Regiment of Fusiliers (1968)
- Flag of the Russian Orthodox Army (2014)

== See also ==
- Saint George
- Saint George in devotions, traditions and prayers
- Princess and dragon
- Ducasse de Mons
- Dragon Hill, Uffington
