= Baugé =

Commune in Maine-et-Loire, France

- Part of Baugé-en-Anjou
- Location of Baugé
- Location within France Location within Pays de la Loire
- Coordinates: 47°32′31″N 0°06′11″W
- Country: France
- Region: Pays de la Loire
- Department: Maine-et-Loire
- Arrondissement: Saumur
- Canton: Baugé
- Commune: Baugé-en-Anjou
- Area^{1}: 8.55 km^{2} (3.30 sq mi)
- Elevation: 56 m (184 ft)
- Highest elevation: 102 m (335 ft)
- Lowest elevation: 41 m (135 ft)
- Population (2022): 3,653
  - Density: 427/km^{2} (1,110/sq mi)
- Time zone: UTC+01:00 (CET)
  - Summer (DST): UTC+02:00 (CEST)
- Postal code: 49150
- ^{1} French Land Register data, which excludes lakes, ponds, glaciers > 1 km^{2} (0.386 sq mi or 247 acres) and river estuaries.

Baugé (French pronunciation: [boʒe]) is a former commune in the Maine-et-Loire département in western France. On 1 January 2013, it was merged with the former communes of Montpollin, Pontigné, Saint-Martin-d'Arcé and Le Vieil-Baugé to create the commune of Baugé-en-Anjou. Since then it is a commune déléguée of this commune.

== Geography and transport ==
Baugé is located 40 km east of Angers, 280 km from Paris, and 70 km from Tours.

Bus connections are available at SNCF railway stations in Saumur, Angers, La Flèche and Le Mans.

The closest airport is Angers - Loire Airport, while the larger Tours Loire Valley Airport is also within easy driving distance.

== Culture ==
The annual festival Opéra de Baugé is held near the town.

== History ==
The Battle of Baugé was fought on the bridge here in 1421.

The 14th century Château de Baugé is located in the centre of the town, as is a 16th-century apothecary. The town has several Roman roads.

Baugé is the twin town of Milngavie (near Glasgow) in Scotland and of Kelsterbach in Germany.

== Population ==
Historical population

Year	Pop.	±% p.a.
1793	3,150	—
1800	3,003	−0.68%
1806	3,150	+0.80%
1821	3,405	+0.52%
1831	3,553	+0.43%
1836	3,400	−0.88%
1841	3,278	−0.73%
1846	3,220	−0.36%
1851	3,329	+0.67%
1856	3,356	+0.16%
1861	3,546	+1.11%
1866	3,562	+0.09%
1872	3,419	−0.68%
1876	3,448	+0.21%
1881	3,449	+0.01%
1886	3,569	+0.69%
1891	3,623	+0.30%
1896	3,344	−1.59%

Year	Pop.	±% p.a.
1901	3,325	−0.11%
1906	3,199	−0.77%
1911	3,235	+0.22%
1921	2,868	−1.20%
1926	2,848	−0.14%
1931	2,738	−0.78%
1936	2,916	+1.27%
1946	3,484	+1.80%
1954	3,510	+0.09%
1962	3,363	−0.53%
1968	3,657	+1.41%
1975	3,807	+0.58%
1982	3,898	+0.34%
1990	3,748	−0.49%
1999	3,663	−0.25%
2006	3,454	−0.84%
2022	3,653	+0.35%

Source: EHESS and INSEE

== Politics ==
The centre-right candidate Philippe Chalopin defeated the incumbent Guy Delepine in the 2008 mayoral elections.

In the 2007 presidential elections, Baugé supported Nicolas Sarkozy.

== See also ==
- Communes of the Maine-et-Loire department
