= Guillaume Robin =

Architect and general contractor

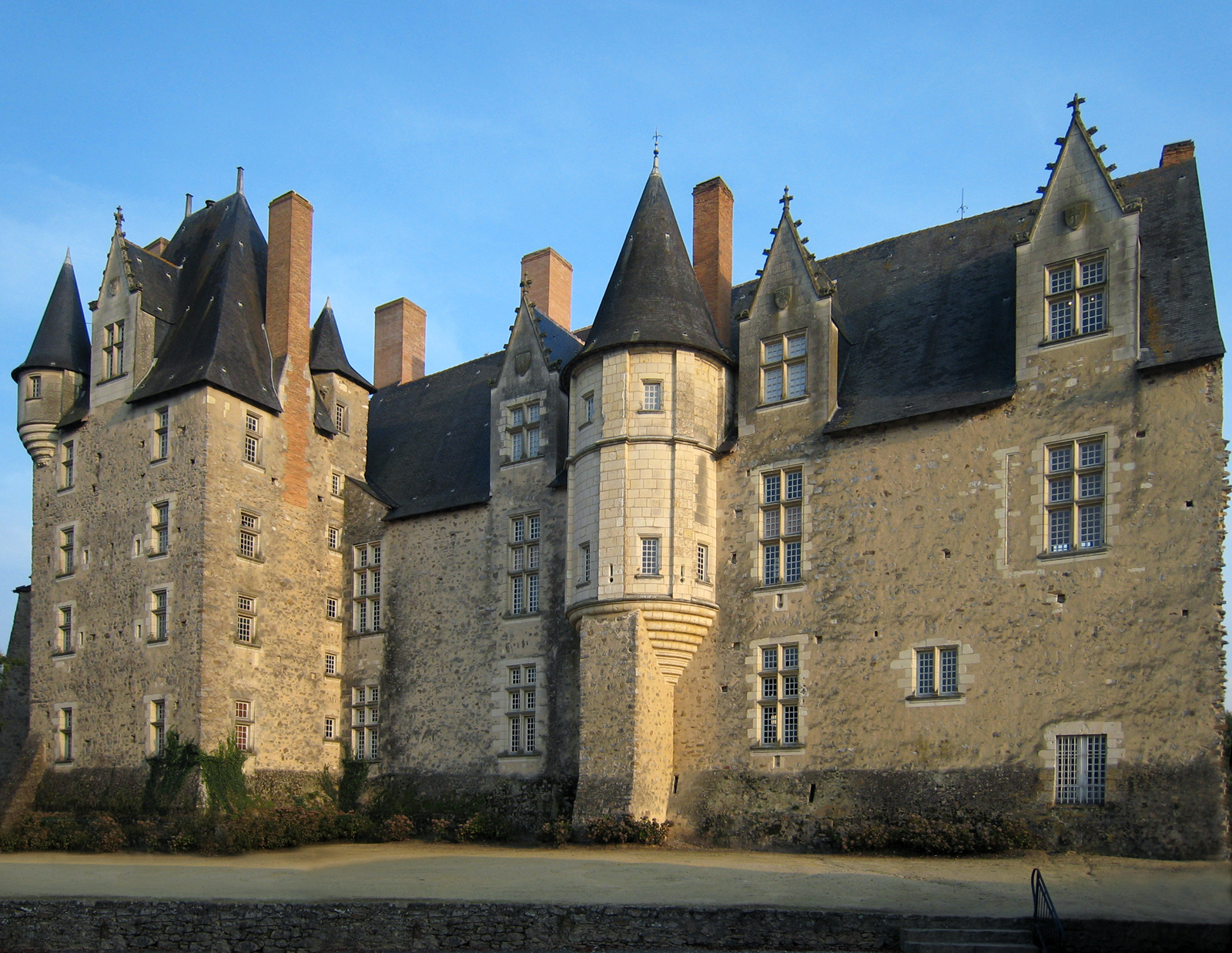
The Château de Baugé, work of Guillaume Robin.

Guillaume Robin, was a 15th-century architect and general contractor from Anjou.

Robin owes his fame to King René of Anjou who used his know-how for the realization of several monuments in Anjou.

As early as 1435, René d'Anjou asked his project manager, Robin, to double the size of his royal dwelling of the Château d'Angers with a gallery whose staircase bears his motto on the vault. He also had him build the châtelet around 1450.

In 1453, Robin redid the paving of the transept north of the Saint-Maurice Catheral of Angers. He also built in the cathedral the right-hand staircase to provide access to the library in the south transept. He worked on the construction of the cathedral of Angers at the same time as the master glassmaker André Robin who installed the stained glass windows in the cathedral.

In 1454, at the end of the Hundred Years' War, René of Anjou inherited the ruins of his mother's castle in the town of Le Vieil-Baugé, still glowing with the French victory at the Battle of Baugé. He built a hunting lodge the size of a manor house, which became the Château de Baugé. The work was completed in 1465.
