= René-François Régnier =

French cardinal (1794–1881)

His Eminence René-François Régnier
- Archbishop of Cambrai
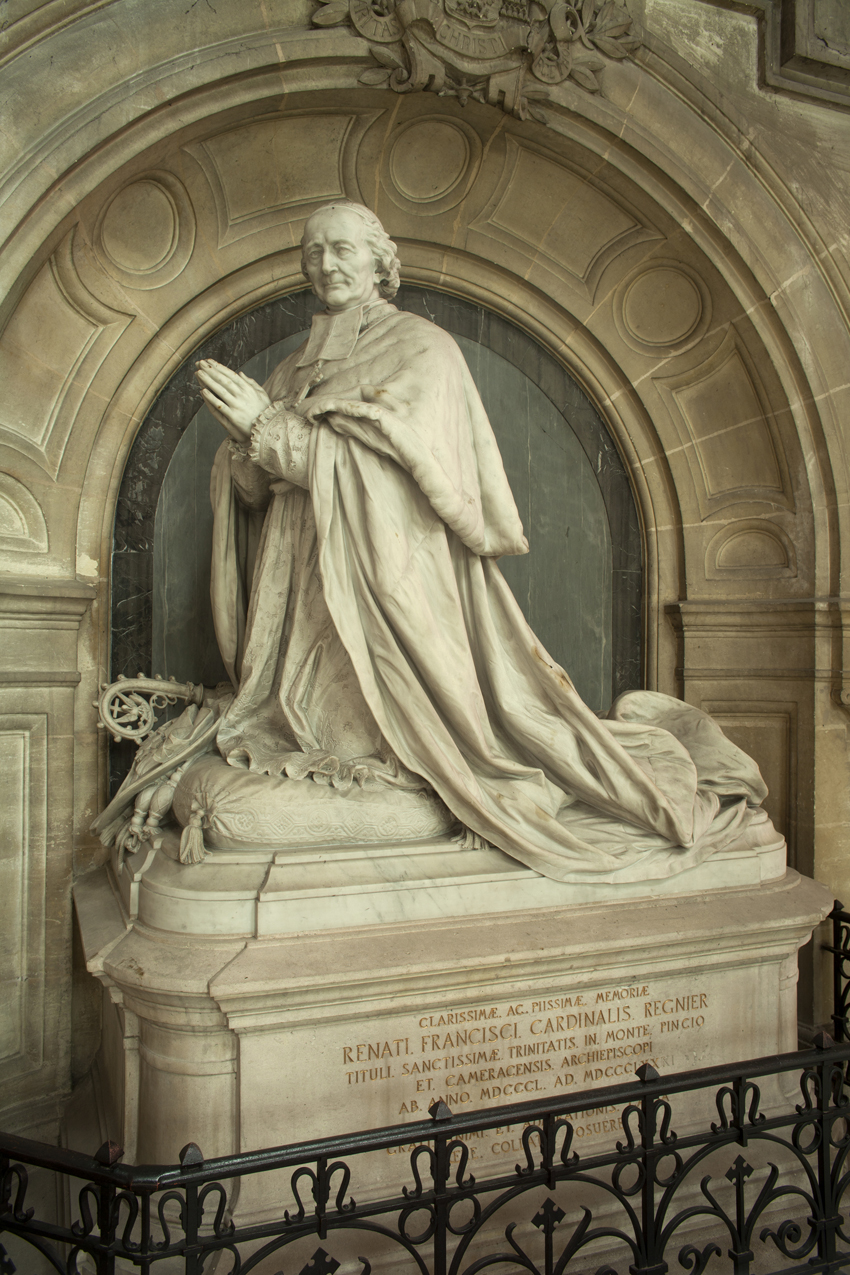
- Church: Roman Catholic Church
- Archdiocese: Cambrai
- See: Cambrai
- Appointed: 30 September 1850
- Term ended: 3 January 1881
- Predecessor: Pierre Giraud
- Successor: Alfred Duquesnayt
- Other post: Cardinal-Priest of Santissima Trinità al Monte Pincio (1874-81)
- Previous post: Bishop of Angoulême (1842-50)

Orders
- Ordination: 19 December 1818
- Consecration: 22 July 1842 by Denis-Auguste Affre
- Created cardinal: 22 December 1873 by Pope Pius IX
- Rank: Cardinal-Priest

Personal details
- Born: René-François Régnier; 17 July 1794 Saint-Quentin-lès-Beaurepaire, French First Republic
- Died: 3 January 1881 (aged 86) Cambrai, French Third Republic
- Buried: Cambrai Cathedral
- Parents: François Régnier; Renée Périgois
- Motto: Charitas Christi urget nos
- Coat of arms

René-François Régnier (French pronunciation: [ʁəne fʁɑ̃swa ʁeɲe]; 17 July 1794 – 3 January 1881, Rome) was a French cardinal.

== Biography ==
Cardinal Rengnier was born on 17 July 1794 at Saint-Quentin-les Beaurepaire in the region of Cambrai, France. His parents were François Régnier and Renée Périgois. He was ordained a priest on 22 December 1818. He was consecrated bishop of the Diocese of Angoulême by his predecessor Cardinal Pierre Giraud on 22 July 1842, and succeeded him as archbishop of the Cambrai on 30 September 1850.

Pope Pius IX created him as the Cardinal-Priest of Santissima Trinità dei Monti on 22 December 1873. He died on 3 January 1881 and was buried at the Cathedral of Cambrai.

== See also ==
- Roman Catholic Archdiocese of Cambrai
- Roman Catholic Diocese of Angoulême

Catholic Church titles
Preceded by Jean-Joseph-Pierre Guigou	Bishop of Angoulême; 18 June 1841 – 16 May 1850	Succeeded by Antoine-Charles Cousseau
Preceded by Pierre Giraud	Archbishop of Cambrai; 30 September 1850 – 3 January 1881	Succeeded by Alfred Duquesnay
Preceded by Paolo Mangelli Orsi	Cardinal-Priest of Santissima Trinità dei Monti; 22 December 1873 – 3 January 1881	Succeeded by Pietro Lasagni
Preceded by Costantino Patrizi Naro	Secretary of the Supreme Sacred Congregation of the Universal and Roman Inquisition; 21 December 1876 – 28 October 1881	Succeeded by Antonio Maria Panebianco
Records
Preceded by Antonio Tosti	Oldest living Member of the Sacred College; 20 March 1866 – 3 January 1881	Succeeded by Prospero Caterini
