= Pavillon de chasse =

French term for a hunting lodge

A pavillon de chasse (French: [pavijɔ̃ d(ə) ʃas]; "hunting pavilion") in France is a building dedicated to venery. They are built in areas where hunts take place regularly. The history of pavillons de chasse is a part of the history of venery and hunting with hounds and its role in terms of leisure purposes or summit meetings, and more broadly in the stewardship of the hunt. They are sometimes referred to as rendez-vous de chasse.

== History ==
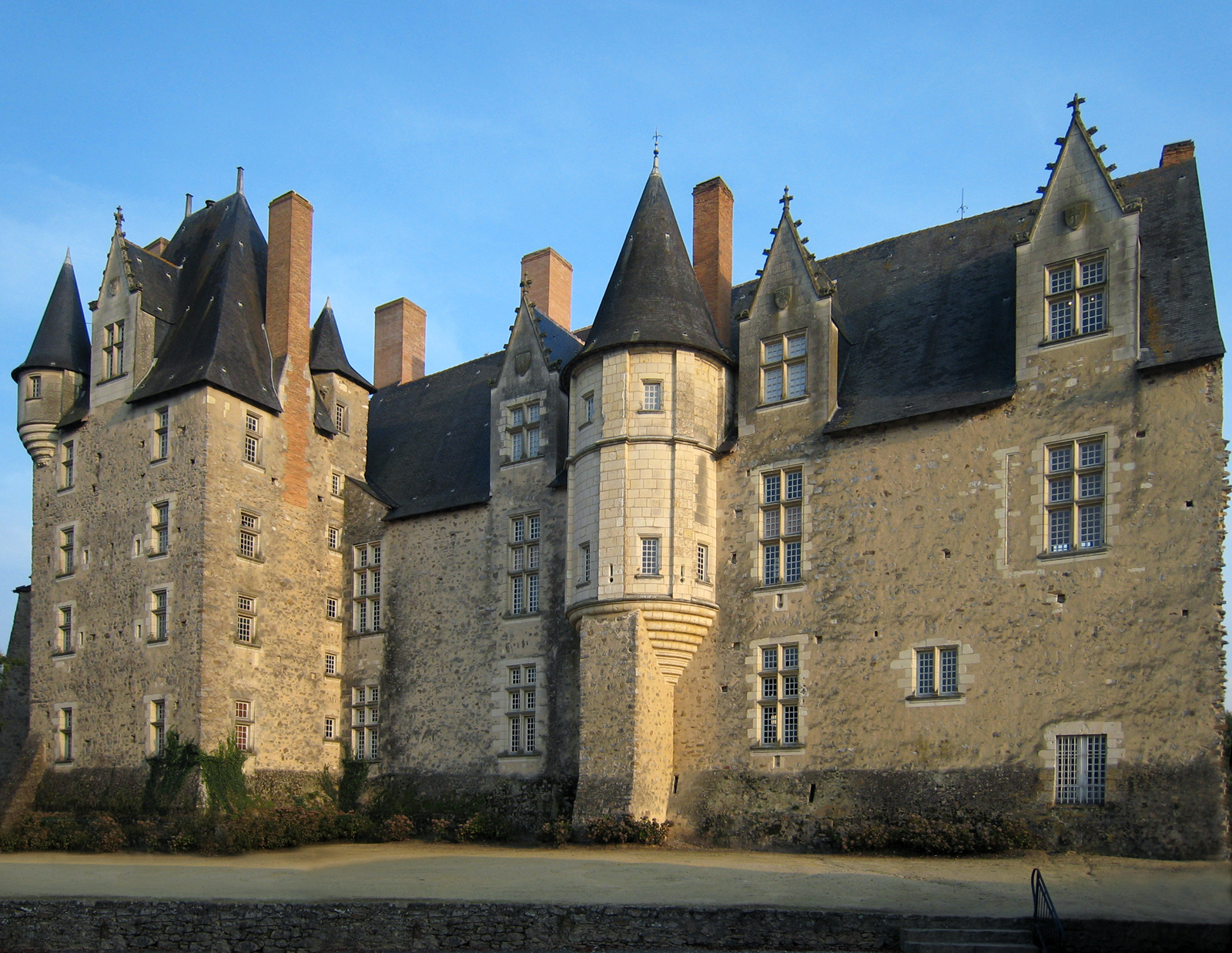
Château de Baugé, an ancient pavillon de chasse for René I of Anjou.

=== Renaissance period ===
During the Renaissance, princes and great lords built pavillons de chasse for their leisure in their forest estates. One was King René of Anjou who, in the 15th century, built them in his states of Anjou and Provence. Notable examples are the Château de Baugé in Anjou or Gardanne in Provence.

These pavilions were in the Renaissance style and looked more like richly ornate manor houses than princely castles or palaces. They were effectively second homes with a rustic appearance but with the comfort and decor worthy of the rank of their owners at the time, and designed by renowned architects attached to their court.

Francis I of France had pavillons de chasse or rendez-vous de chasse constructed in Sologne and the Loire Valley as well as in Cognac where he built the Logis du Bouquet. Later, Italian architects were employed to remodel the pavillons de chasse into "sumptuous châteaux" of the Italian Renaissance style.

=== Ancien Régime ===
During the Ancien Régime, interest in hunting lodges grew across Europe, especially in the Holy Roman Empire, where the Jagdschloss was prized by its nobility.

Some of these hunting pavilions became famous, such as that of the Palace of Versailles. In 1623, Louis XIII decided to build a pavillon de chasse in the village of Versailles. From 1661, his successor and his son, Louis XIV, seized with a real passion for this modest building, transformed it into a château.

Others became manors or small palaces, such as the Pavillon du Butard in La Celle-Saint-Cloud, the Pavillon de la Muette in Forest of Saint-Germain-en-Laye, the La Lanterne in Versailles; others have become princely residences, manors or small castles, like that of Désert de Retz in Chambourcy.

== Gallery ==
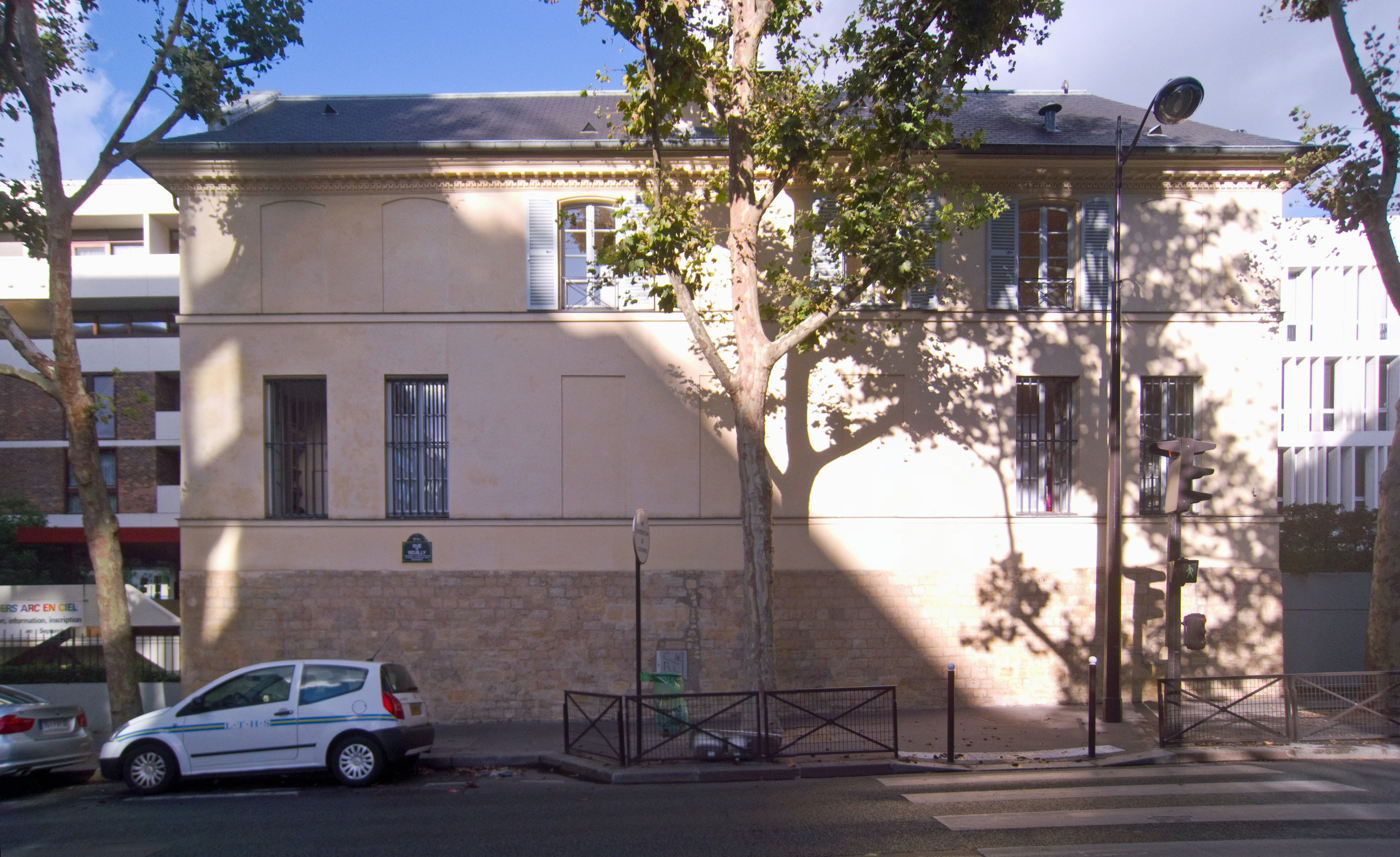
Pavillon de chasse of the Duke of Guise in Paris (12th arrondissement)

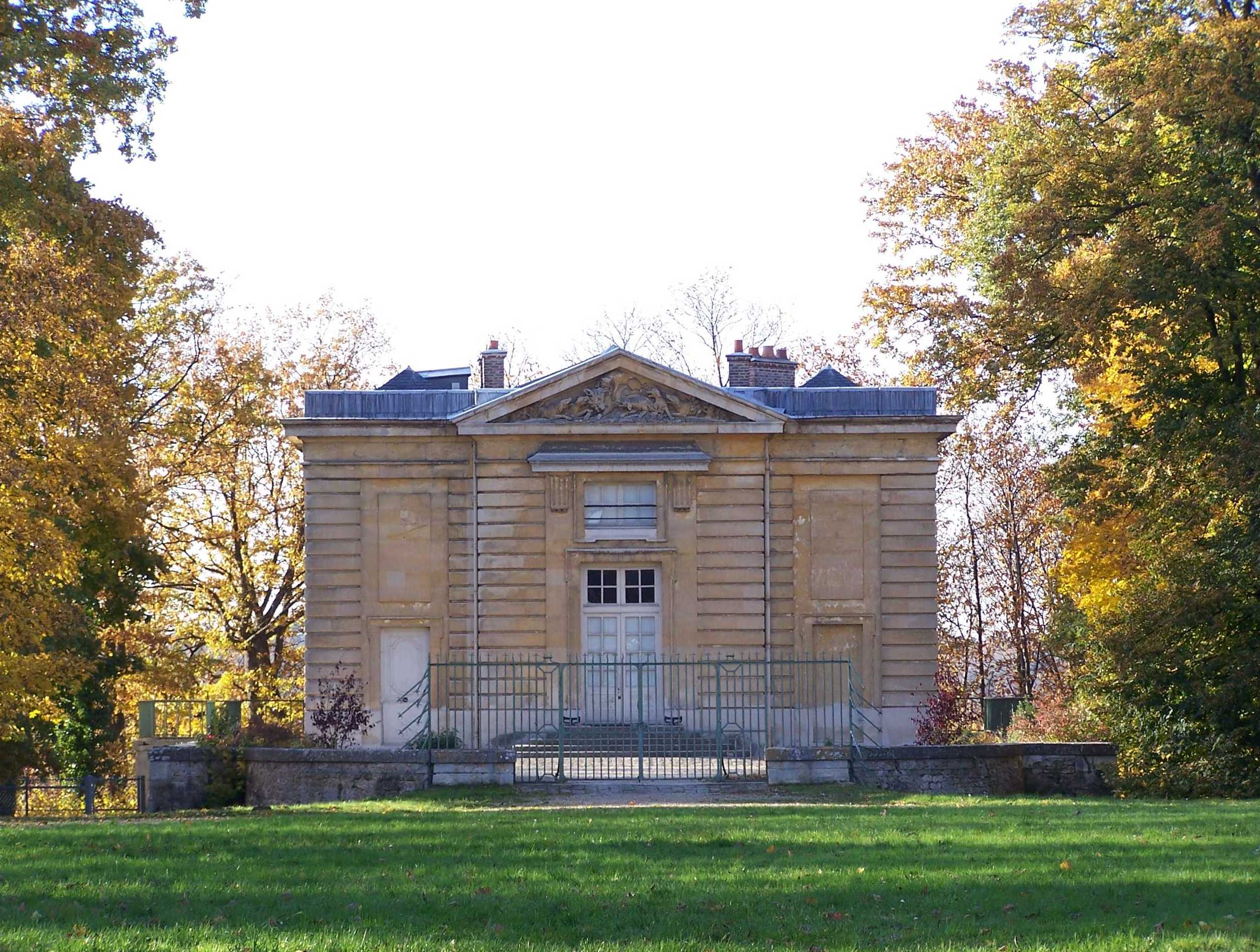
Butard at Celle-Saint-Cloud (Yvelines)

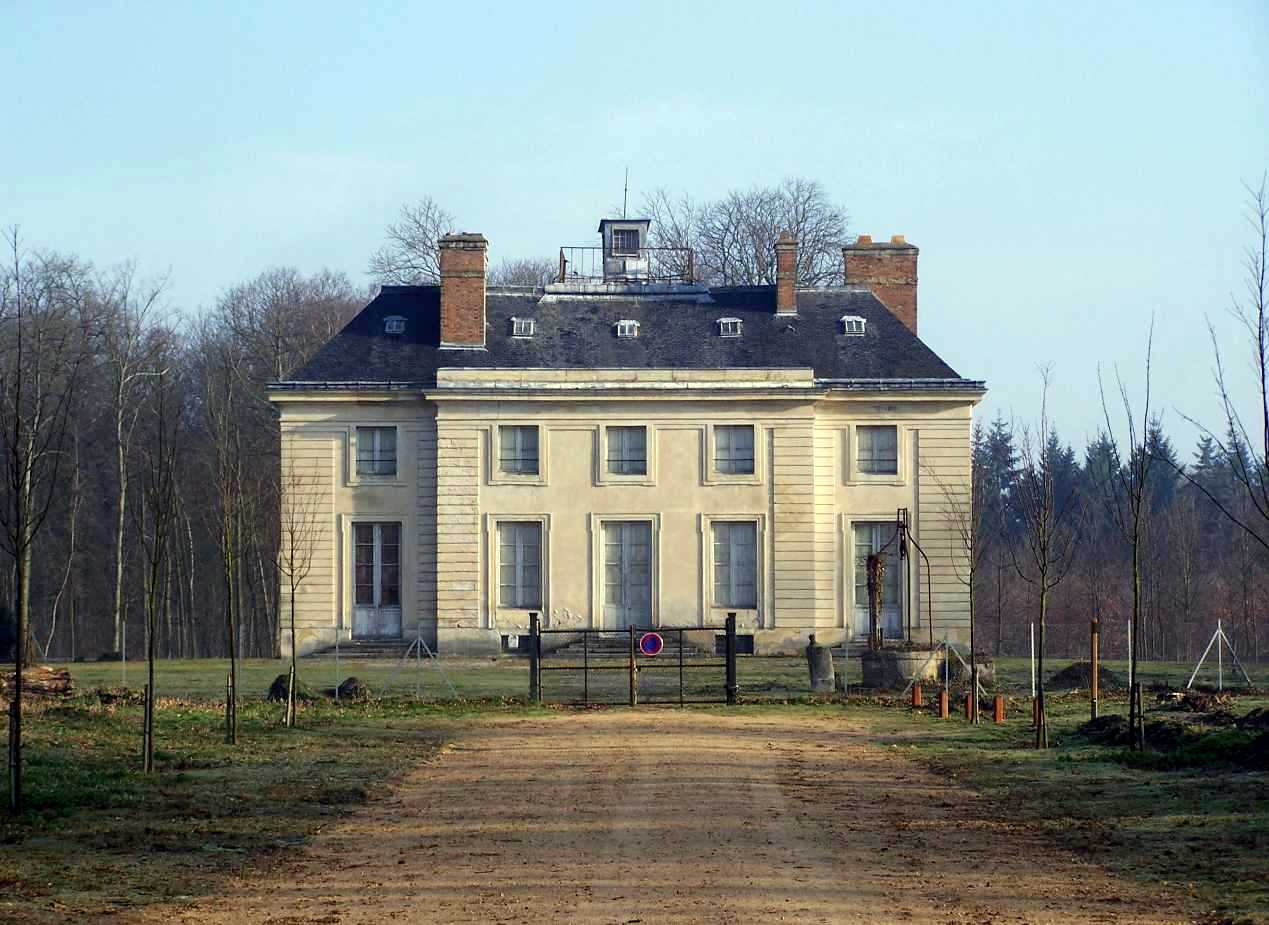
Pavillon de la Muette at Saint-Germain-en-Laye (Yvelines)

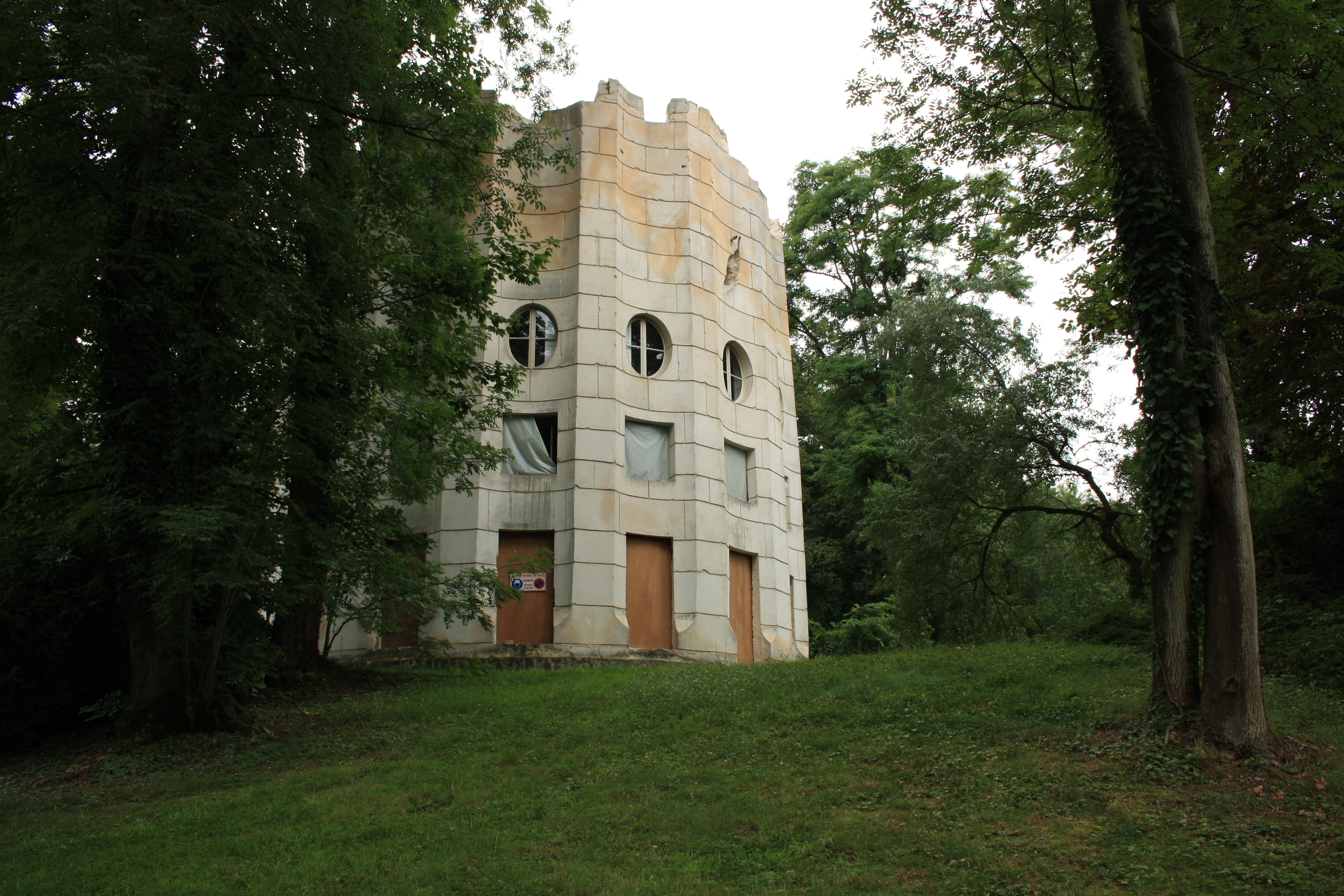
Ruined example: the Désert de Retz at Chambourcy (Yvelines)

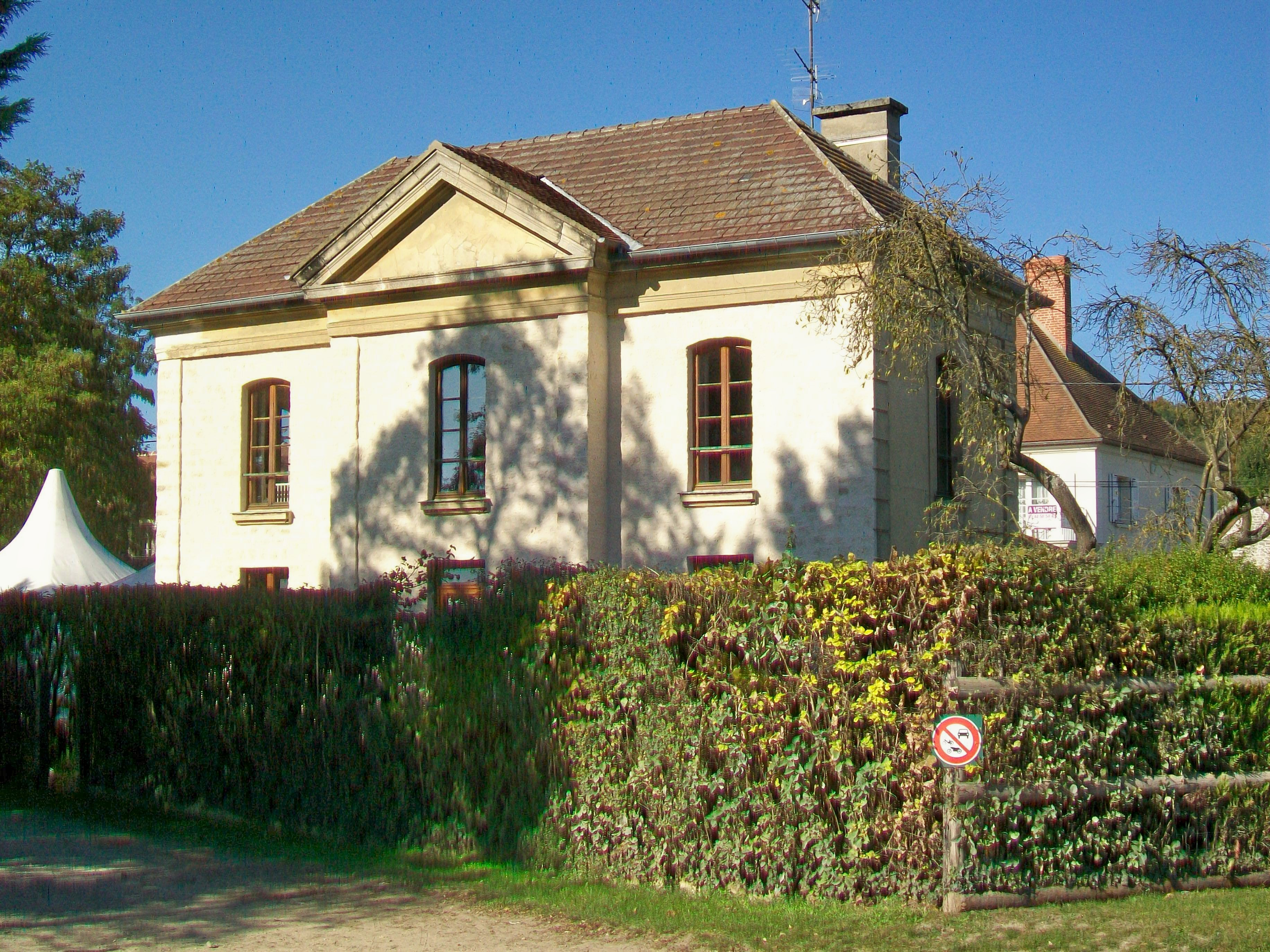
Ancient example on the estate of Chantilly at Apremont (Oise)

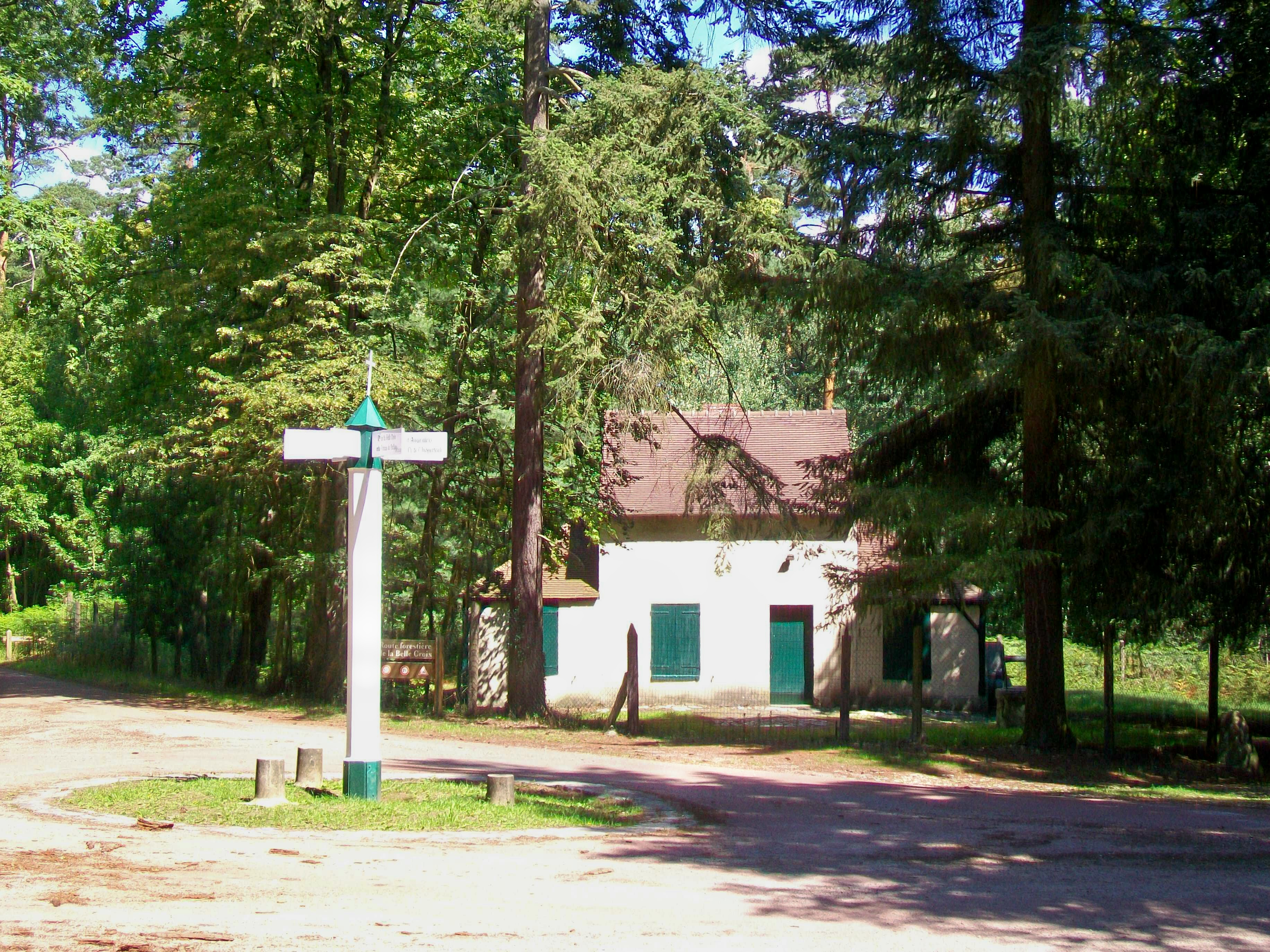
Pavillon de chasse in the Forest of Halatte at Senlis (Oise)

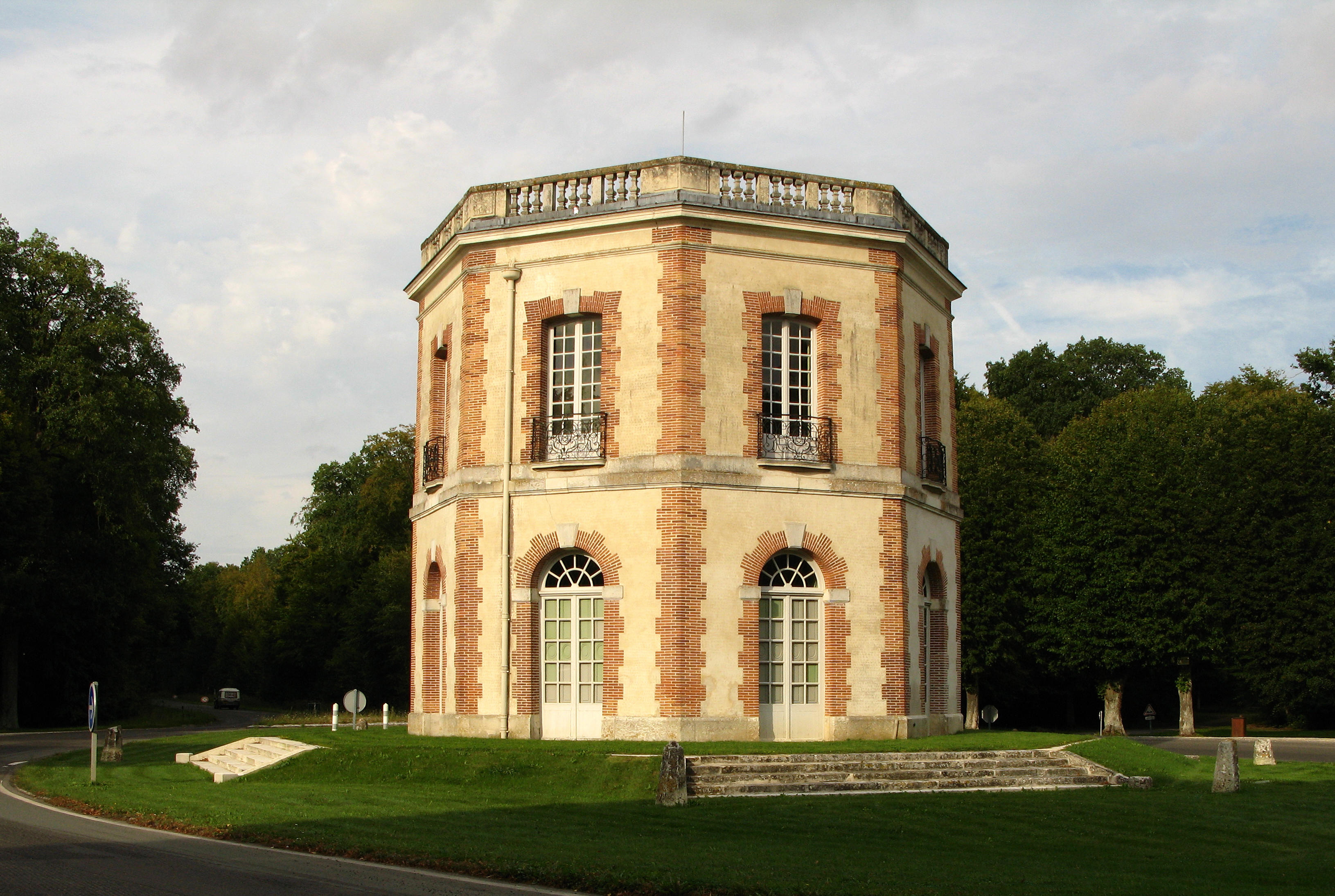
Octagonal pavillon de chasse in the Forest of Dreux (Eure-et-Loir)

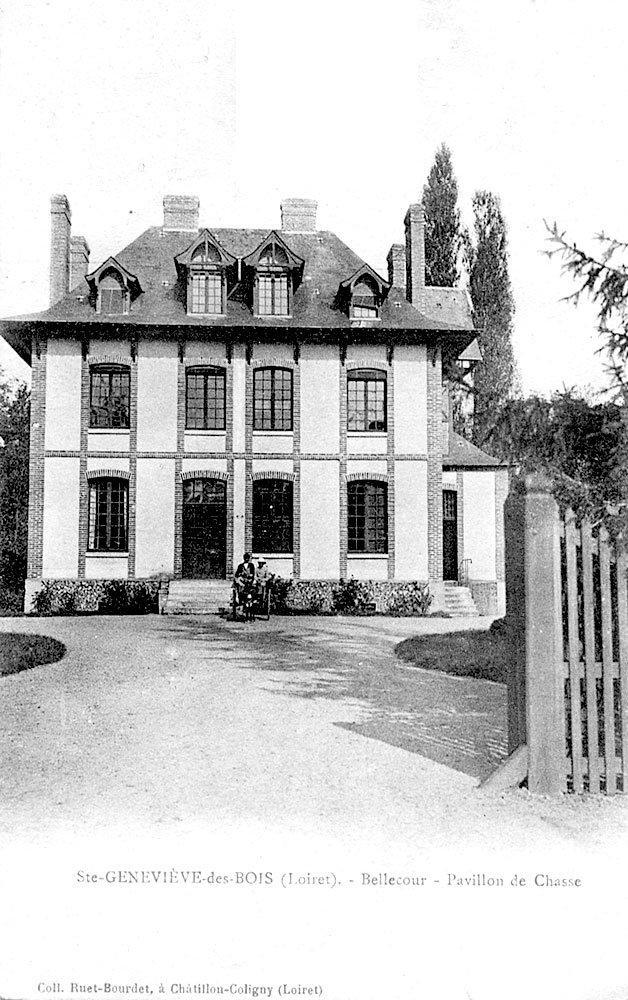
Pavillon de chasse of Bellecour at Sainte-Geneviève-des-Bois (Loiret)

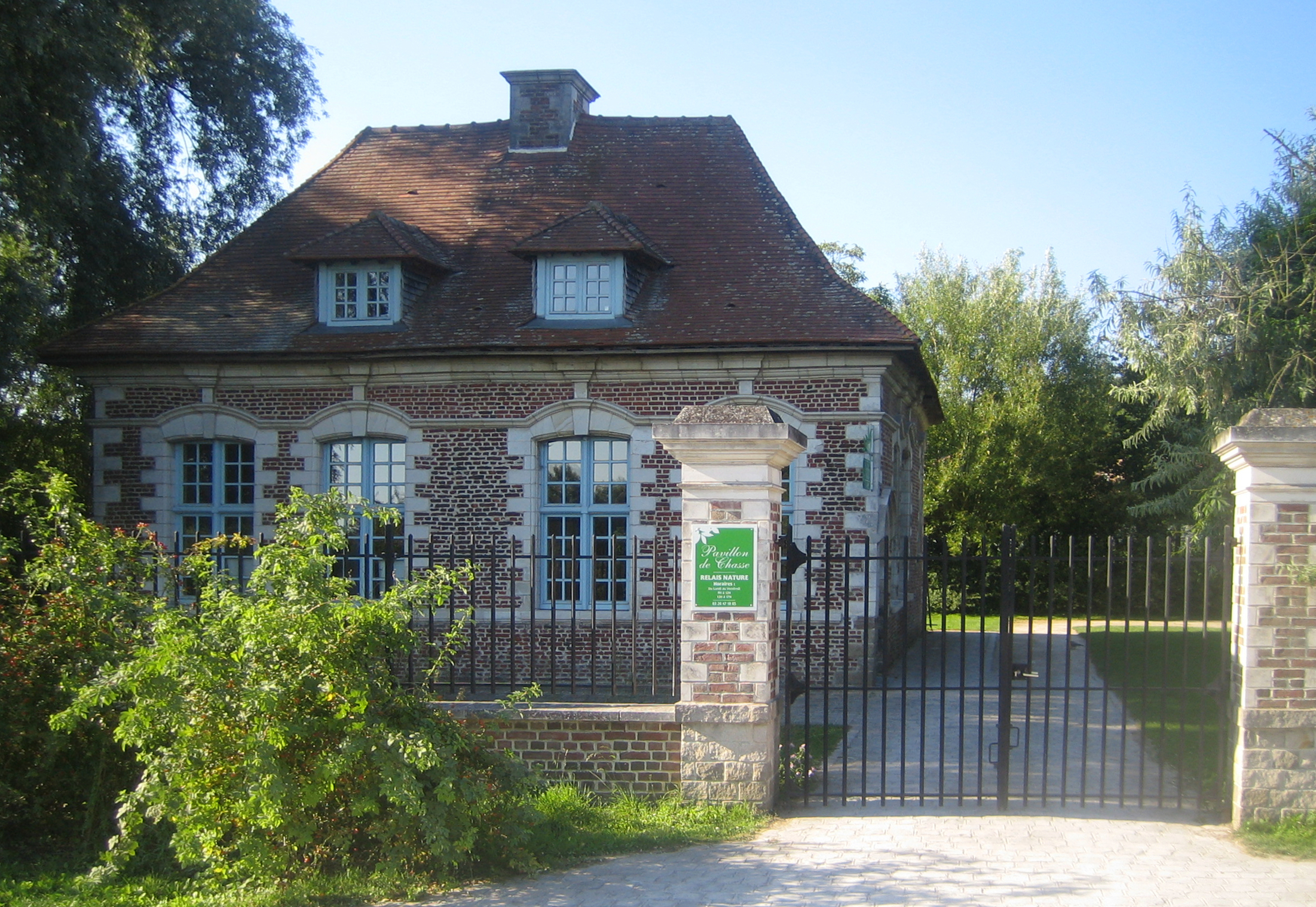
Pavillon de chasse in the Parc du Héron at Villeneuve-d'Ascq (north)

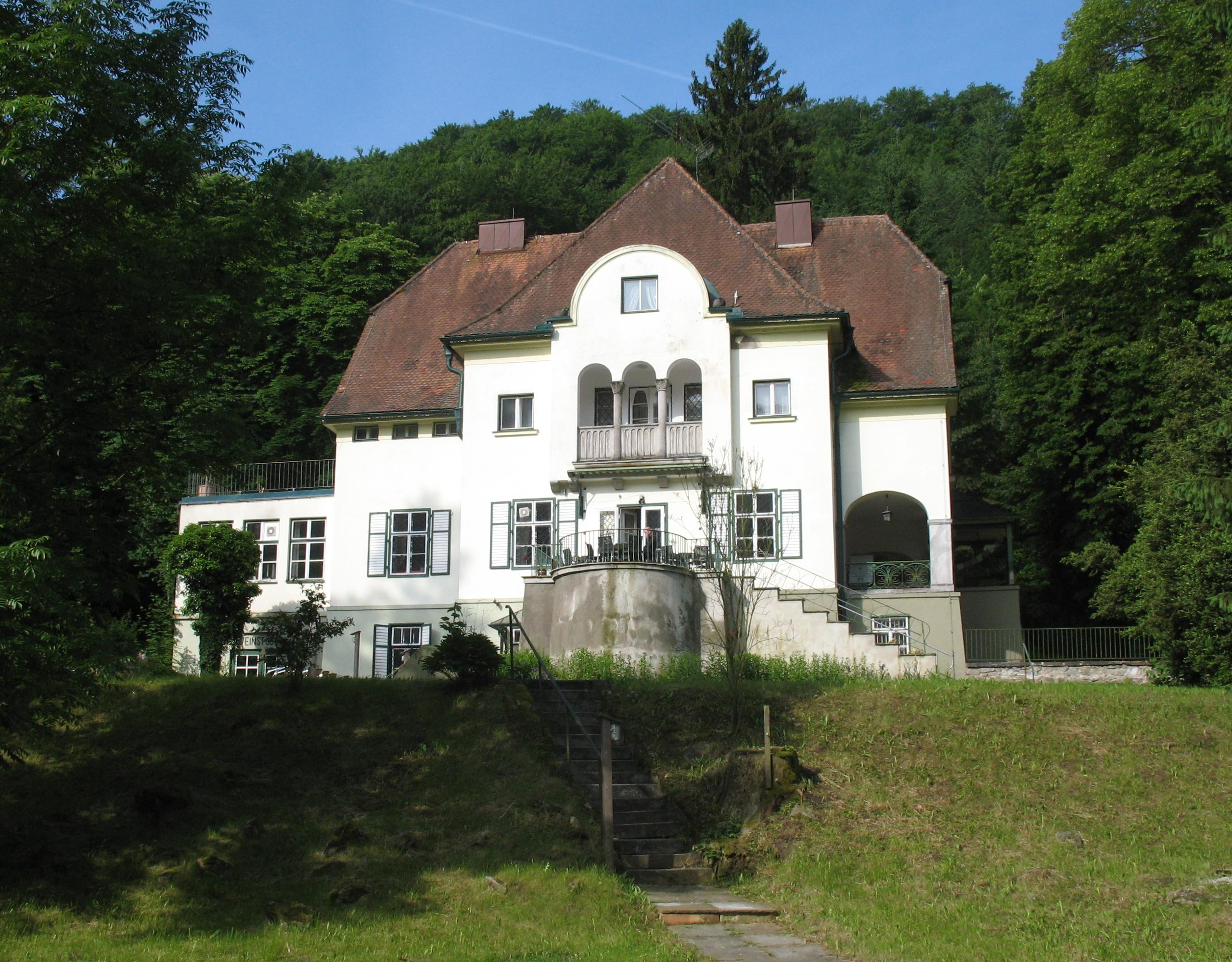
Jagdschloss at Dunkelsteinerwald-Kochholz

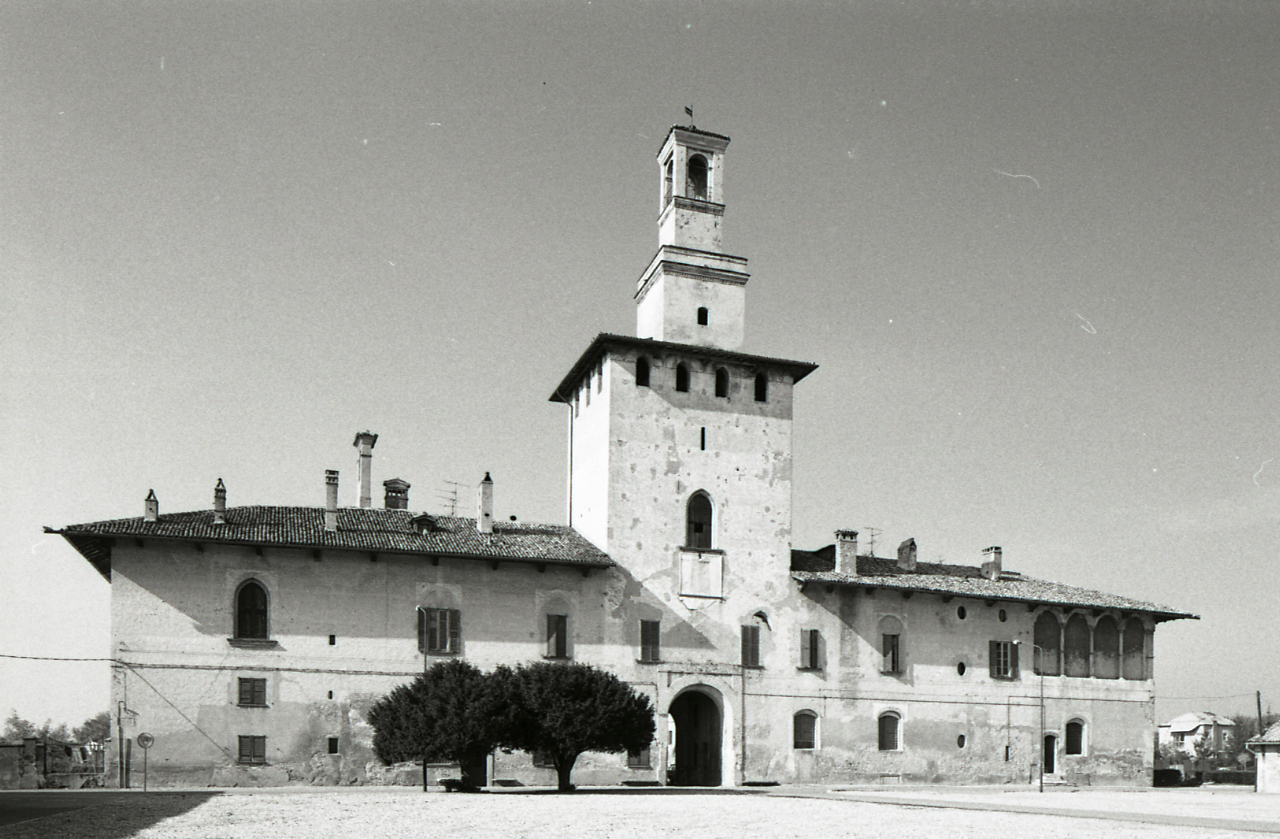
Castello visconteo de Cusago. Photograph by Paolo Monti.

== See also ==
- Jagdschloss
- English hunting lodge
- Schloss Holzheim a Jagdschloss in Hesse, Germany

== Literature ==
- Blomfield, Reginald (2017). A History of French Architecture: from the reign of Charles VIII till the death of Mazarin. Nicosia: Verone.
- Kibler, William W., Grover A. Zinn, Lawrence Earp and John Bell Henneman (1995). "Hunting and Fowling" in Medieval France: An Encyclopedia. NY/London: Garland. pp. 890 ff.
- Scott Hain, W. (2019). The History of France, 2nd edn. Sta Barbar, CA: Greenwood.
