= Fougeré, Maine-et-Loire =

Fougeré
- Part of Baugé-en-Anjou
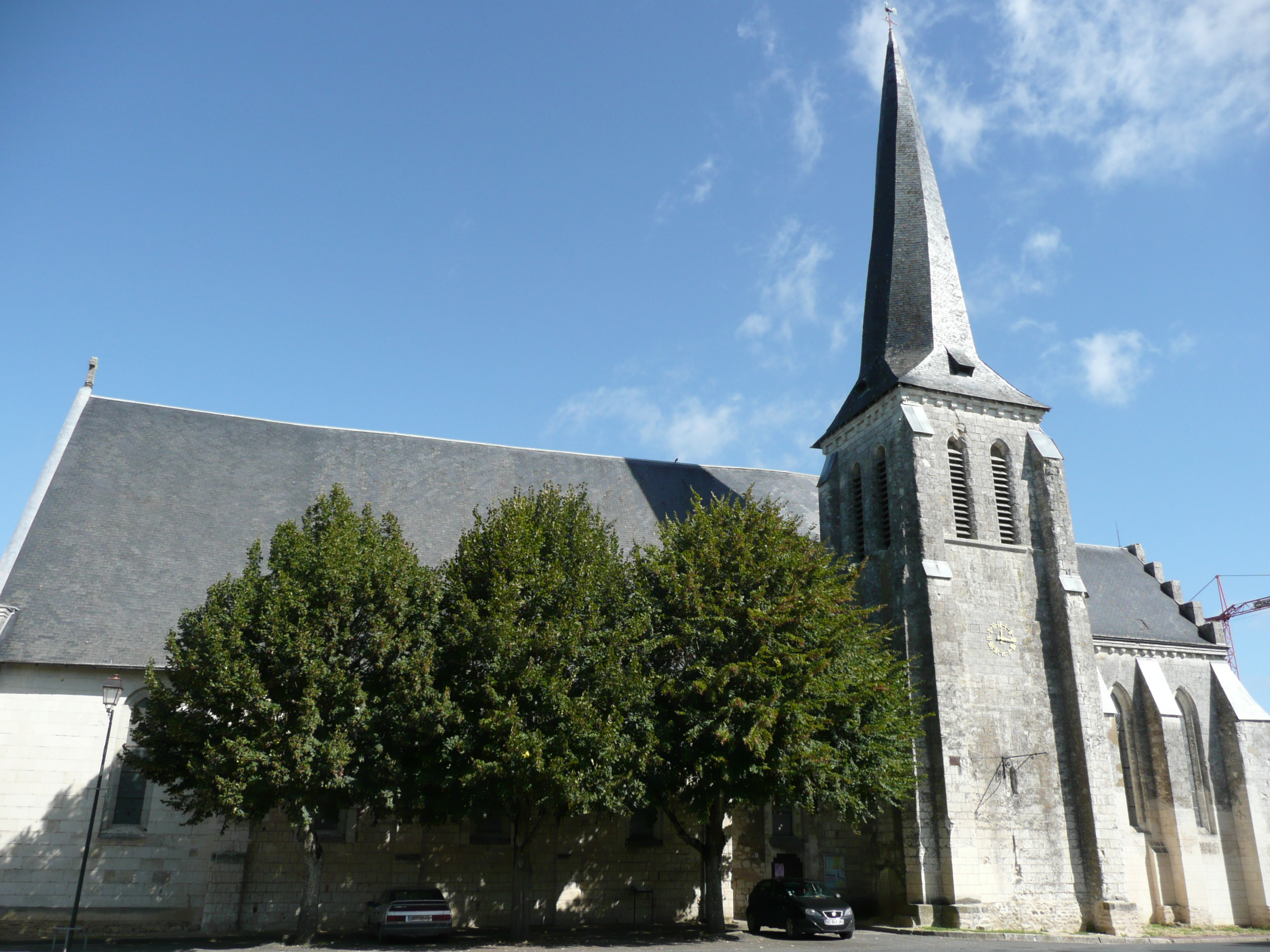
- St. Stephen Church
- Location of Fougeré
- Location within France Location within Pays de la Loire
- Coordinates: 47°37′41″N 0°08′49″W
- Country: France
- Region: Pays de la Loire
- Department: Maine-et-Loire
- Arrondissement: Saumur
- Canton: Beaufort-en-Vallée
- Commune: Baugé-en-Anjou
- Area^{1}: 24.18 km^{2} (9.34 sq mi)
- Elevation: 42 m (138 ft)
- Highest elevation: 102 m (335 ft)
- Lowest elevation: 27 m (89 ft)
- Population (2022): 820
  - Density: 34/km^{2} (88/sq mi)
- Demonym(s): Fougéréen, Fougéréenne
- Time zone: UTC+01:00 (CET)
  - Summer (DST): UTC+02:00 (CEST)
- Postal code: 49150
- ^{1} French Land Register data, which excludes lakes, ponds, glaciers > 1 km^{2} (0.386 sq mi or 247 acres) and river estuaries.

Fougeré is a former commune in the Maine-et-Loire department in western France. On 1 January 2016, it was merged into the commune of Baugé-en-Anjou.

== See also ==
- Communes of the Maine-et-Loire department
