= Saint-Martin-d'Arcé =

- Part of Baugé-en-Anjou
- Location of Saint-Martin-d'Arcé
- Location within France Location within Pays de la Loire
- Coordinates: 47°33′35″N 0°05′01″W
- Country: France
- Region: Pays de la Loire
- Department: Maine-et-Loire
- Arrondissement: Saumur
- Canton: Beaufort-en-Vallée
- Commune: Baugé-en-Anjou
- Area^{1}: 13.18 km^{2} (5.09 sq mi)
- Elevation: 75 m (246 ft)
- Highest elevation: 95 m (312 ft)
- Lowest elevation: 52 m (171 ft)
- Population (2022): 786
  - Density: 59.6/km^{2} (154/sq mi)
- Time zone: UTC+01:00 (CET)
  - Summer (DST): UTC+02:00 (CEST)
- Postal code: 49150
- ^{1} French Land Register data, which excludes lakes, ponds, glaciers > 1 km^{2} (0.386 sq mi or 247 acres) and river estuaries.

Saint-Martin-d'Arcé (French pronunciation: [sɛ̃ maʁtɛ̃ daʁse]) is a former commune in the Maine-et-Loire département in western France. On 1 January 2013, it was merged with the former communes of Baugé, Montpollin, Pontigné and Le Vieil-Baugé to create the commune of Baugé-en-Anjou. Its population was 786 in 2022.

== See also ==
- Communes of the Maine-et-Loire department
