= Cuon, Maine-et-Loire =

Cuon
- Part of Baugé-en-Anjou
- Location of Cuon
- Location within France Location within Pays de la Loire
- Coordinates: 47°28′44″N 0°06′01″W
- Country: France
- Region: Pays de la Loire
- Department: Maine-et-Loire
- Arrondissement: Saumur
- Canton: Baugé
- Commune: Baugé-en-Anjou
- Area^{1}: 13.13 km^{2} (5.07 sq mi)
- Elevation: 54 m (177 ft)
- Highest elevation: 91 m (299 ft)
- Lowest elevation: 36 m (118 ft)
- Population (2022): 631
  - Density: 48.1/km^{2} (124/sq mi)
- Time zone: UTC+01:00 (CET)
  - Summer (DST): UTC+02:00 (CEST)
- Postal code: 49150
- ^{1} French Land Register data, which excludes lakes, ponds, glaciers > 1 km^{2} (0.386 sq mi or 247 acres) and river estuaries.

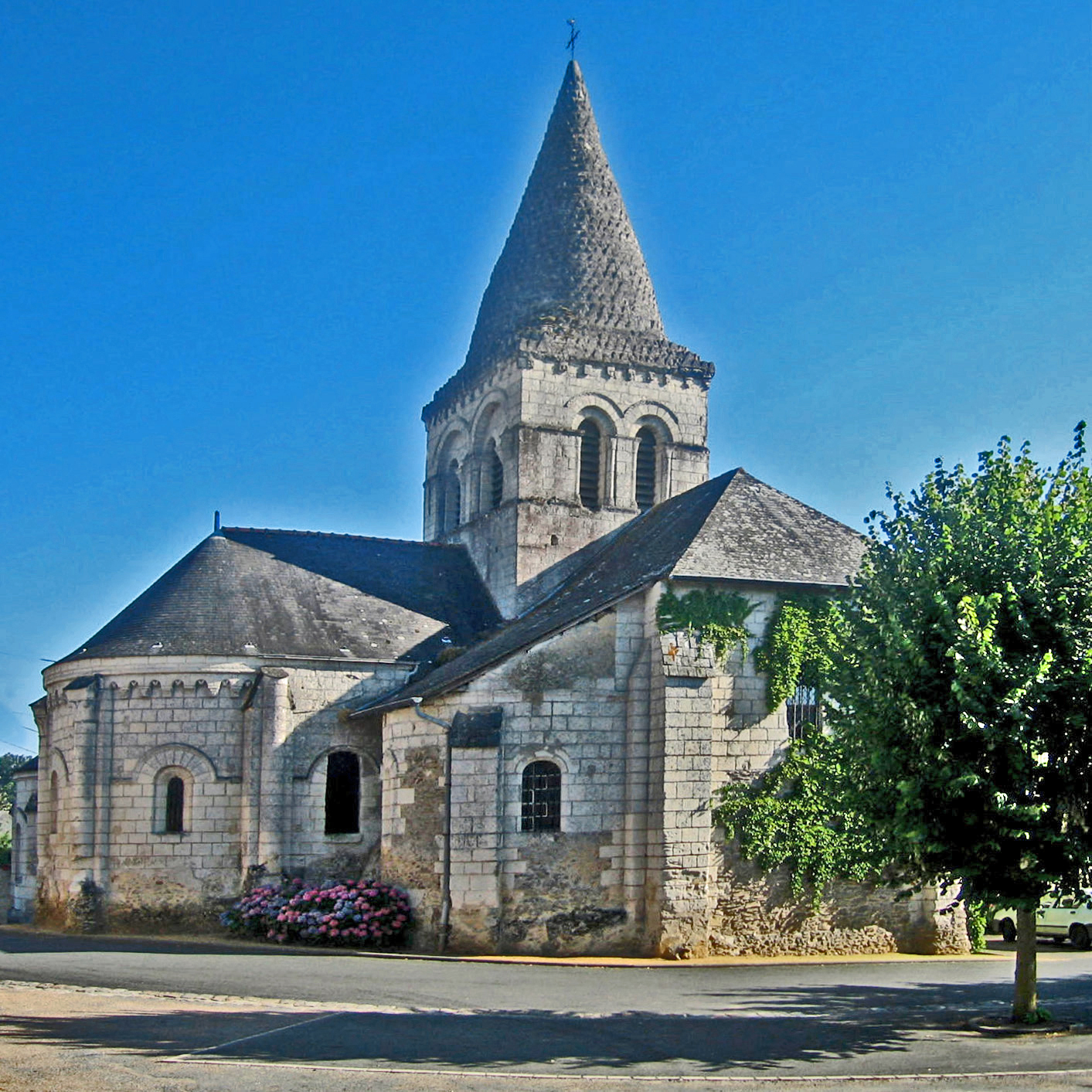
Cuon-St-Serge-nord-est

Cuon (French pronunciation: [kɥɔ̃]) is a former commune in the Maine-et-Loire department in western France. On 1 January 2016, it was merged into the commune of Baugé-en-Anjou. Its population was 631 in 2022.

== History ==
Cuon was the site of settlements during the Neolithic and Gallo-Roman periods. It was a seigneurie and parish in the eleventh century.

== Sights ==
- Menhir de Pierrefitte
- Château de La Graffinière (fifteenth century), restored during the nineteenth and twentieth centuries
- Old manors (farms) of Cussé, Vaux, La Genneveselière (sixteenth century)

== See also ==
- Communes of the Maine-et-Loire department
