= Le Guédeniau =

- Part of Baugé-en-Anjou
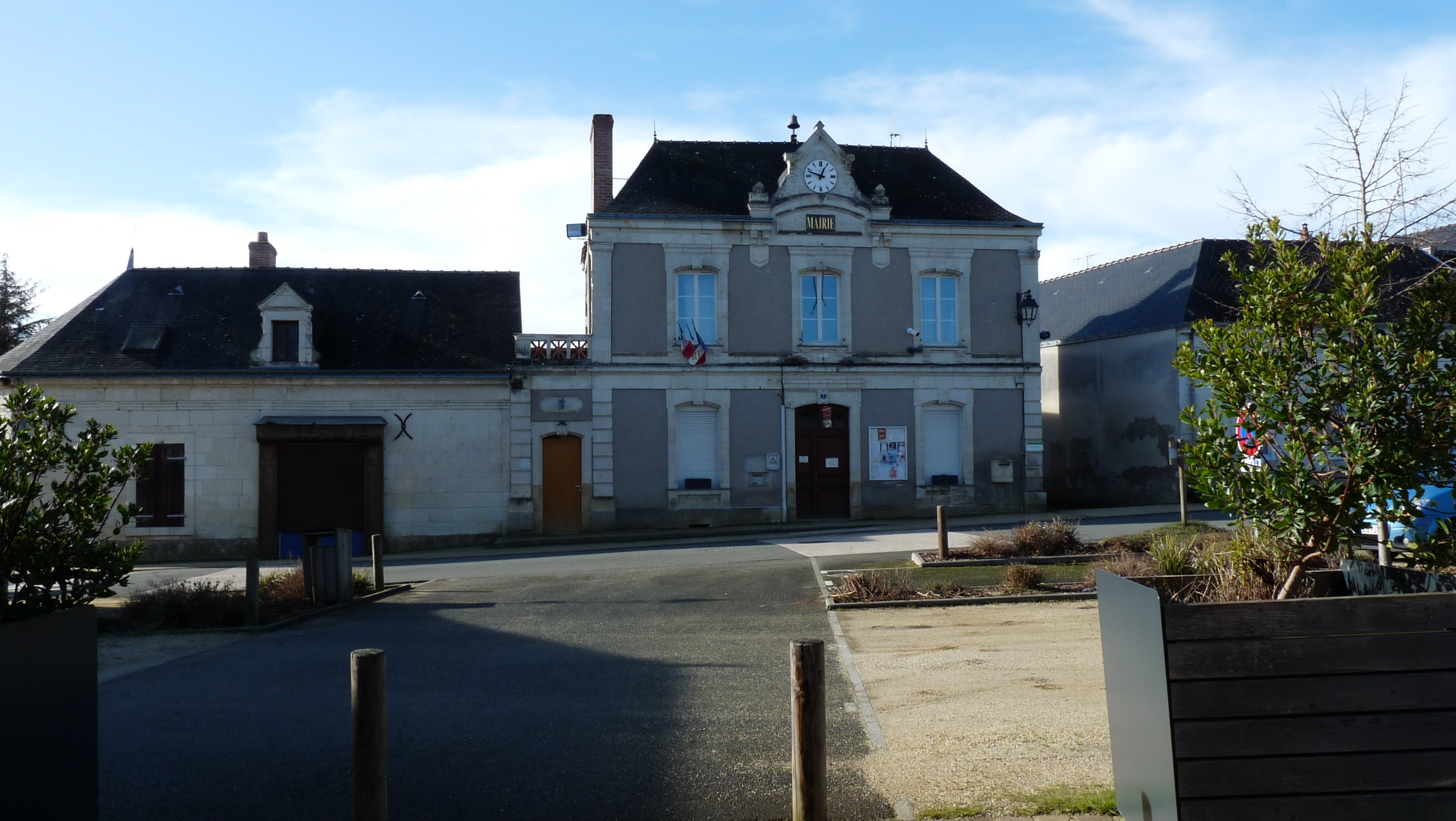
- Le Guédeniau Town hall
- Location of Le Guédeniau
- Location within France Location within Pays de la Loire
- Coordinates: 47°29′43″N 0°02′46″W
- Country: France
- Region: Pays de la Loire
- Department: Maine-et-Loire
- Arrondissement: Saumur
- Canton: Beaufort-en-Vallée
- Commune: Baugé-en-Anjou
- Area^{1}: 18.1 km^{2} (7.0 sq mi)
- Elevation: 55 m (180 ft)
- Highest elevation: 102 m (335 ft)
- Lowest elevation: 48 m (157 ft)
- Population (2022): 356
  - Density: 19.7/km^{2} (50.9/sq mi)
- Demonym(s): Guedaniellissois, Guedaniellissoise
- Time zone: UTC+01:00 (CET)
  - Summer (DST): UTC+02:00 (CEST)
- Postal code: 49150
- Website: Le Guédeniau, site de la commune
- ^{1} French Land Register data, which excludes lakes, ponds, glaciers > 1 km^{2} (0.386 sq mi or 247 acres) and river estuaries.

Le Guédeniau (French pronunciation: [lə ɡedənjo], before 2010: Le Guédéniau) is a former commune in the Maine-et-Loire department in western France. On 1 January 2016, it was merged into the commune of Baugé-en-Anjou.

== See also ==
- Communes of the Maine-et-Loire department
