= Échemiré =

- Part of Baugé-en-Anjou
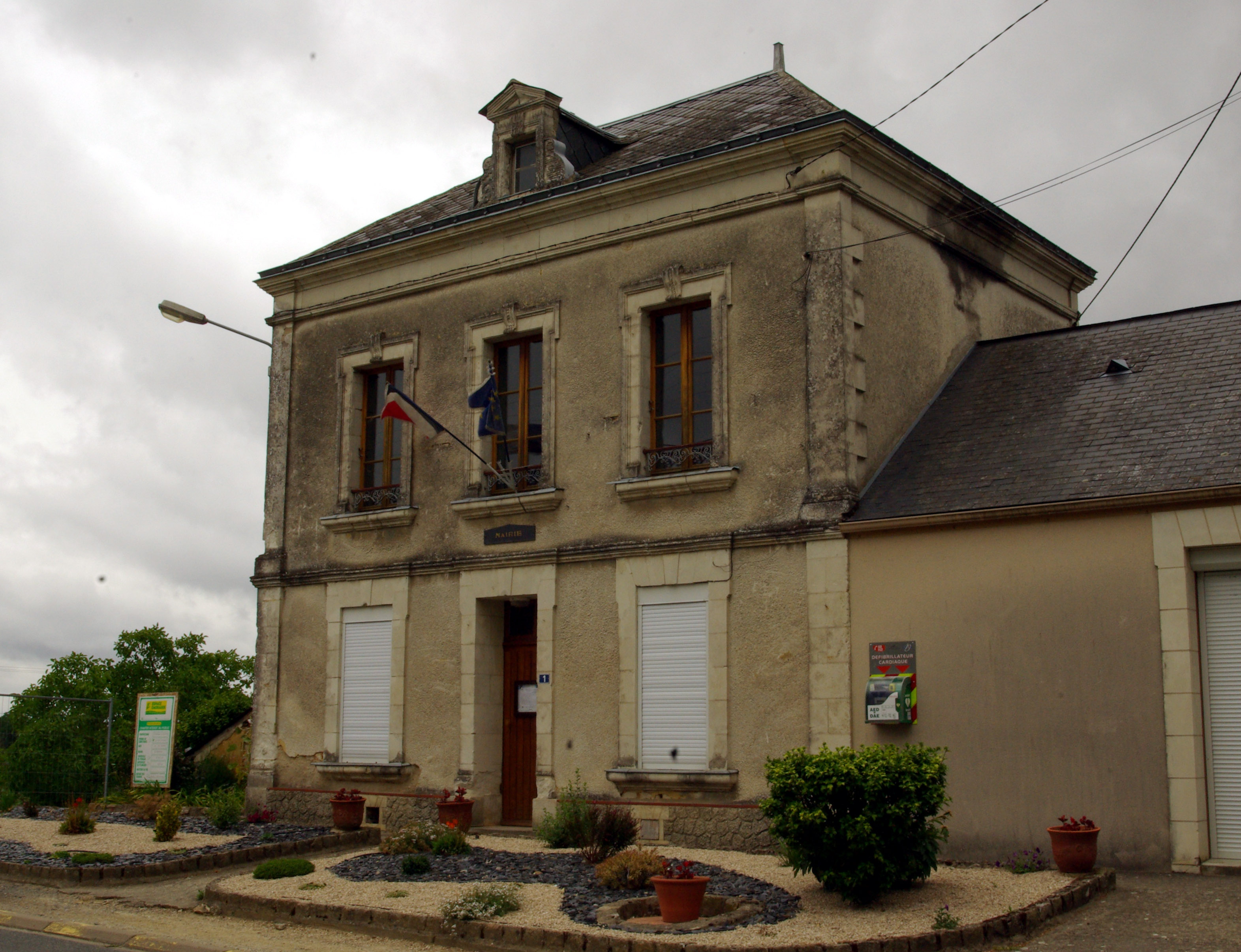
- The town hall

- Coat of arms
- Location of Échemiré
- Location within France Location within Pays de la Loire
- Coordinates: 47°33′08″N 0°10′02″W
- Country: France
- Region: Pays de la Loire
- Department: Maine-et-Loire
- Arrondissement: Saumur
- Canton: Beaufort-en-Vallée
- Commune: Baugé-en-Anjou
- Area^{1}: 16.98 km^{2} (6.56 sq mi)
- Elevation: 63 m (207 ft)
- Highest elevation: 101 m (331 ft)
- Lowest elevation: 33 m (108 ft)
- Population (2022): 554
  - Density: 32.6/km^{2} (84.5/sq mi)
- Demonym(s): Echemiréen, Echemiréenne
- Time zone: UTC+01:00 (CET)
  - Summer (DST): UTC+02:00 (CEST)
- Postal code: 49150
- ^{1} French Land Register data, which excludes lakes, ponds, glaciers > 1 km^{2} (0.386 sq mi or 247 acres) and river estuaries.

Échemiré (French pronunciation: [eʃmiʁe]) is a former commune in the Maine-et-Loire department in western France. On 1 January 2016, it was merged into the commune of Baugé-en-Anjou. The inhabitants of the town of Échemiré are Echemiréens, Echemiréennes.

== See also ==
- Communes of the Maine-et-Loire department
