= Pontigné =

- Part of Baugé-en-Anjou
- Location of Pontigné
- Location within France Location within Pays de la Loire
- Coordinates: 47°32′56″N 0°02′25″W
- Country: France
- Region: Pays de la Loire
- Department: Maine-et-Loire
- Arrondissement: Saumur
- Canton: Baugé
- Commune: Baugé-en-Anjou
- Area^{1}: 24.17 km^{2} (9.33 sq mi)
- Highest elevation: 92 m (302 ft)
- Lowest elevation: 47 m (154 ft)
- Population (2022): 226
  - Density: 9.35/km^{2} (24.2/sq mi)
- Demonym(s): Pontatinacusain, Pontatinacusainne
- Time zone: UTC+01:00 (CET)
  - Summer (DST): UTC+02:00 (CEST)
- Postal code: 49150
- ^{1} French Land Register data, which excludes lakes, ponds, glaciers > 1 km^{2} (0.386 sq mi or 247 acres) and river estuaries.

Pontigné (French pronunciation: [pɔ̃tiɲe]) is a former commune in the Maine-et-Loire département in western France. On 1 January 2013, it was merged with the former communes of Baugé, Montpollin, Saint-Martin-d'Arcé and Le Vieil-Baugé to create the commune of Baugé-en-Anjou. Its population was 226 in 2022.

== See also ==
- Communes of the Maine-et-Loire department
