= Cheviré-le-Rouge =

- Part of Baugé-en-Anjou
- Coat of arms
- Location of Cheviré-le-Rouge
- Location within France Location within Pays de la Loire
- Coordinates: 47°35′45″N 0°10′51″W
- Country: France
- Region: Pays de la Loire
- Department: Maine-et-Loire
- Arrondissement: Saumur
- Canton: Beaufort-en-Vallée
- Commune: Baugé-en-Anjou
- Area^{1}: 35.96 km^{2} (13.88 sq mi)
- Elevation: 73 m (240 ft)
- Highest elevation: 104 m (341 ft)
- Lowest elevation: 30 m (98 ft)
- Population (2022): 870
  - Density: 24/km^{2} (63/sq mi)
- Demonym(s): Cheviréen, Cheviréenne
- Time zone: UTC+01:00 (CET)
  - Summer (DST): UTC+02:00 (CEST)
- Postal code: 49150
- Website: Site officiel
- ^{1} French Land Register data, which excludes lakes, ponds, glaciers > 1 km^{2} (0.386 sq mi or 247 acres) and river estuaries.

Cheviré-le-Rouge (French pronunciation: [ʃəviʁe lə ʁuʒ]) is a former commune in the Maine-et-Loire department of western France. On 1 January 2016, it was merged into the commune of Baugé-en-Anjou.

== See also ==
- Communes of the Maine-et-Loire department
- Port of Nantes
