= Chartrené =

- Part of Baugé-en-Anjou
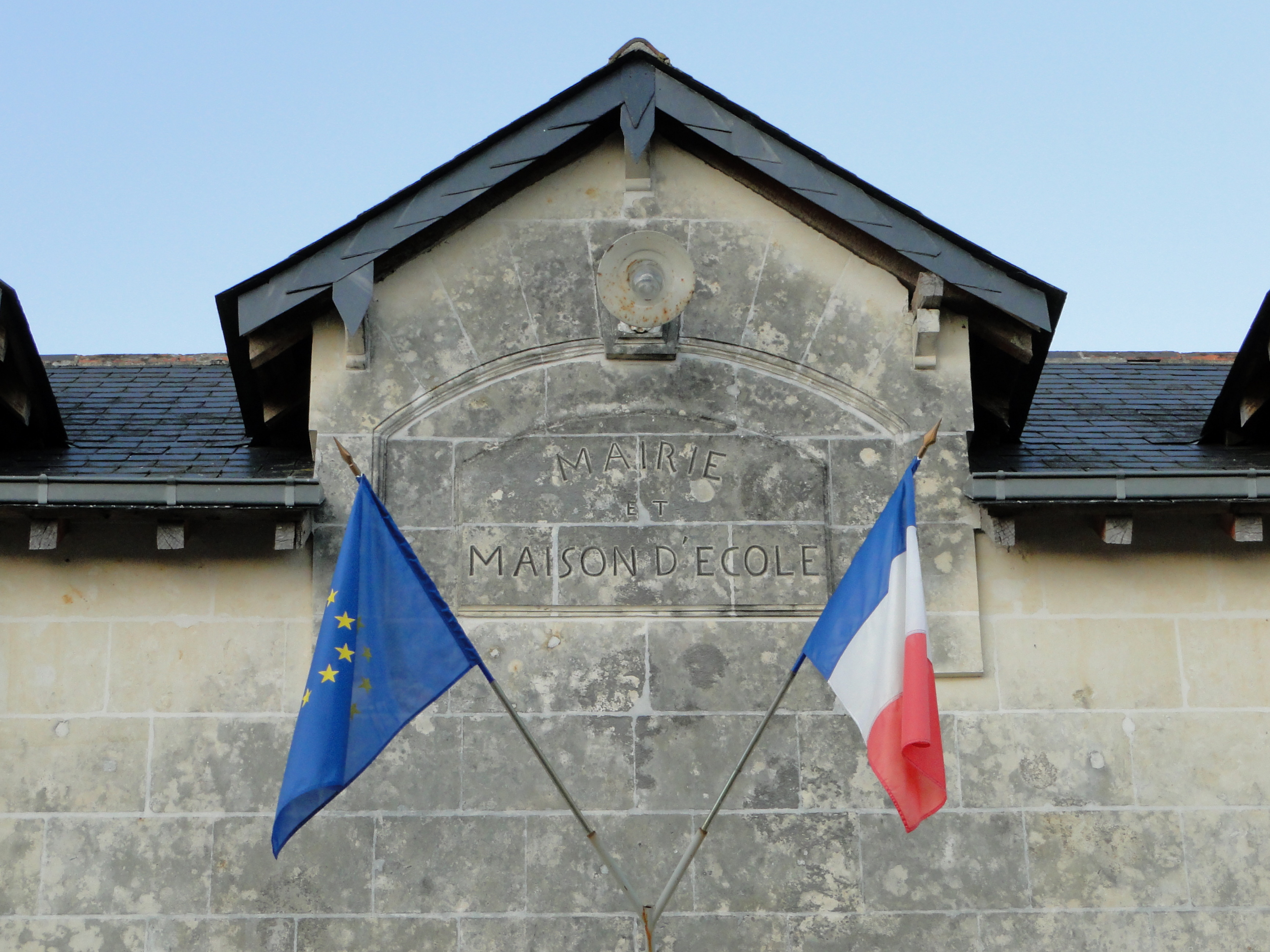
- Chartrené Town hall
- Location of Chartrené
- Location within France Location within Pays de la Loire
- Coordinates: 47°29′34″N 0°07′30″W
- Country: France
- Region: Pays de la Loire
- Department: Maine-et-Loire
- Arrondissement: Saumur
- Canton: Beaufort-en-Vallée
- Commune: Baugé-en-Anjou
- Area^{1}: 3.79 km^{2} (1.46 sq mi)
- Elevation: 43 m (141 ft)
- Highest elevation: 97 m (318 ft)
- Lowest elevation: 33 m (108 ft)
- Population (2022): 41
  - Density: 11/km^{2} (28/sq mi)
- Demonym(s): Chartrénéen, Chartrénéenne
- Time zone: UTC+01:00 (CET)
  - Summer (DST): UTC+02:00 (CEST)
- Postal code: 49150
- ^{1} French Land Register data, which excludes lakes, ponds, glaciers > 1 km^{2} (0.386 sq mi or 247 acres) and river estuaries.

Chartrené (French pronunciation: [ʃaʁtʁəne]) is a former commune in the Maine-et-Loire department of western France. On 1 January 2016, it was merged into the commune of Baugé-en-Anjou.

== See also ==
- Communes of the Maine-et-Loire department
