= Bocé =

- Part of Baugé-en-Anjou
- Location of Bocé
- Location within France Location within Pays de la Loire
- Coordinates: 47°30′27″N 0°04′55″W
- Country: France
- Region: Pays de la Loire
- Department: Maine-et-Loire
- Arrondissement: Saumur
- Canton: Baugé
- Commune: Baugé-en-Anjou
- Area^{1}: 16.01 km^{2} (6.18 sq mi)
- Elevation: 52 m (171 ft)
- Highest elevation: 97 m (318 ft)
- Lowest elevation: 39 m (128 ft)
- Population (2023): 637
  - Density: 39.8/km^{2} (103/sq mi)
- Time zone: UTC+01:00 (CET)
  - Summer (DST): UTC+02:00 (CEST)
- Postal code: 49150
- ^{1} French Land Register data, which excludes lakes, ponds, glaciers > 1 km^{2} (0.386 sq mi or 247 acres) and river estuaries.

Bocé (French pronunciation: [bɔse]) is a former commune in the Maine-et-Loire department in western France. On 1 January 2016, it was merged into the commune of Baugé-en-Anjou.

== See also ==
- Communes of the Maine-et-Loire department
