= Castle of Baugé =

Castle in Pays de la Loire, France

Coordinates: 47°32′37″N 0°06′10″W

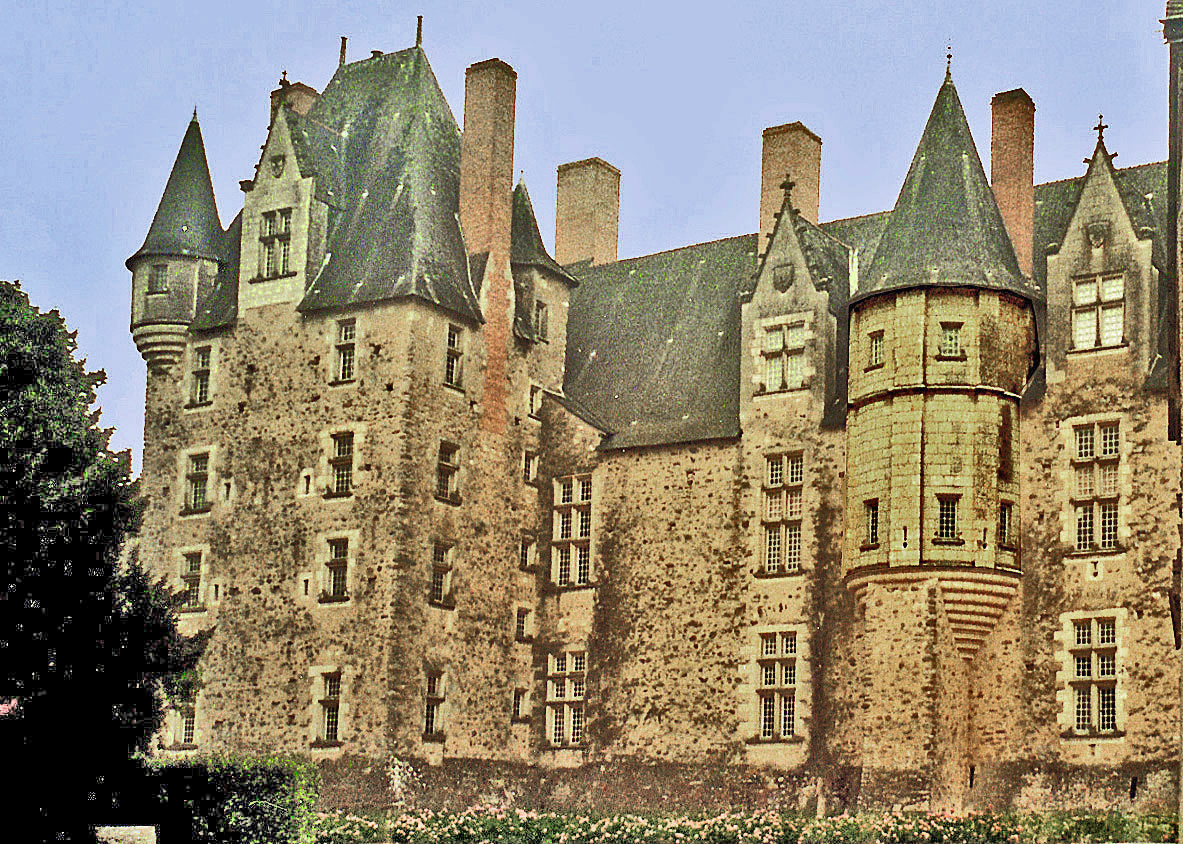
Exterior view (2003).

The Château de Baugé is a castle, extensively altered and restored to create a château, in the commune of Baugé-en-Anjou in the Maine-et-Loire département of France. Construction dates from the first quarter of the 11th century, the second half of the 14th century, the second and third quarters of the 15th century and the second quarter of the 16th century.

== History ==
In 1007, Count Fulk III of Anjou built a powerful fortress on a rocky outcrop at the confluence of two rivers, the Couasnon and the Altrée. The fortress had to withstand the later attacks of his enemy, the count of Blois.

In the 15th century, Yolande of Aragon began construction of a castle within the fortress. She burnt it down during the Hundred Years' War to prevent it being taken by the English. The present structure dates from 1442, when her son René of Anjou inherited the ruin. He decided to build a majestic residence on the site to benefit from the well-stocked game forest of the country and to reside. In 1454, he appointed as his architect Guillaume Robin and construction began the same year. By 1462, some parts were occupied, and the whole was completed in 1465. René also designed the gardens which were planted with shrubs and flowers. The château became one of his favourite homes and he often visited to hunt and for magnificent banquets.

After René's death in 1480, Anjou was annexed under the crown by Louis XI. The barony of Baugé and its château passed through several hands and noted families, notably the family of Alençon, the count of Enghien, the countess of Soissons, Louise et Marie de Savoie-Carignan, the duchess of Luynes, the duke of La Rochefoucauld and the duke of Estissac. Eventually, the barony was given to the future Louis XVIII.

Upkeep of the château was neglected by successive owners who preferred to live elsewhere. In 1790, it was very dilapidated. During the 19th century it was partly used as a cavalry barracks; part was given to the commune and a theatre was installed in 1844. Various piecemeal attempts at repair and restoration were made. In 1960, a major project was begun for the restoration of the exterior of the château.

The castle is the property of the commune and is now a municipal museum. It has been protected since 1961 as a monument historique by the French Ministry of Culture.

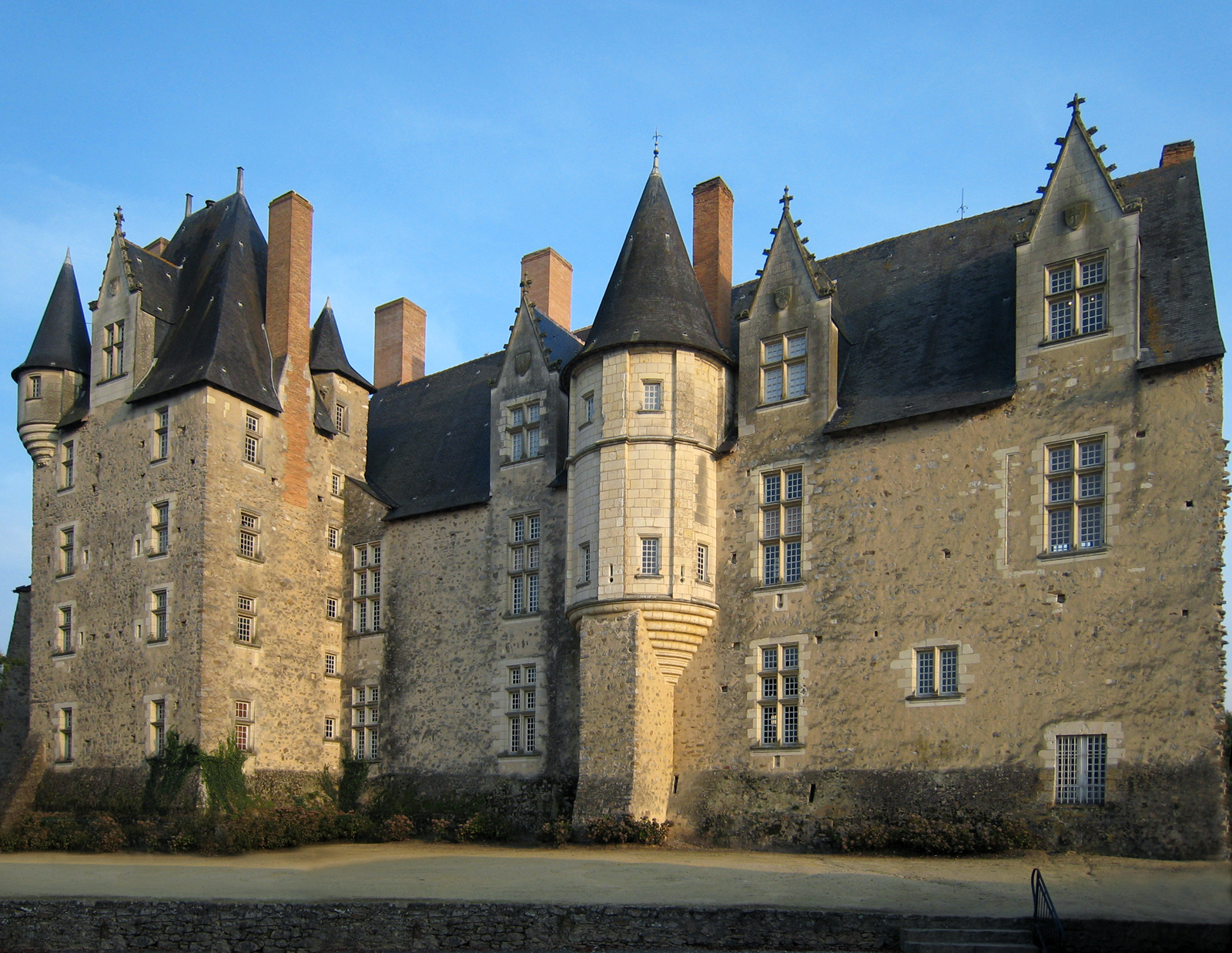
Exterior view (2007).

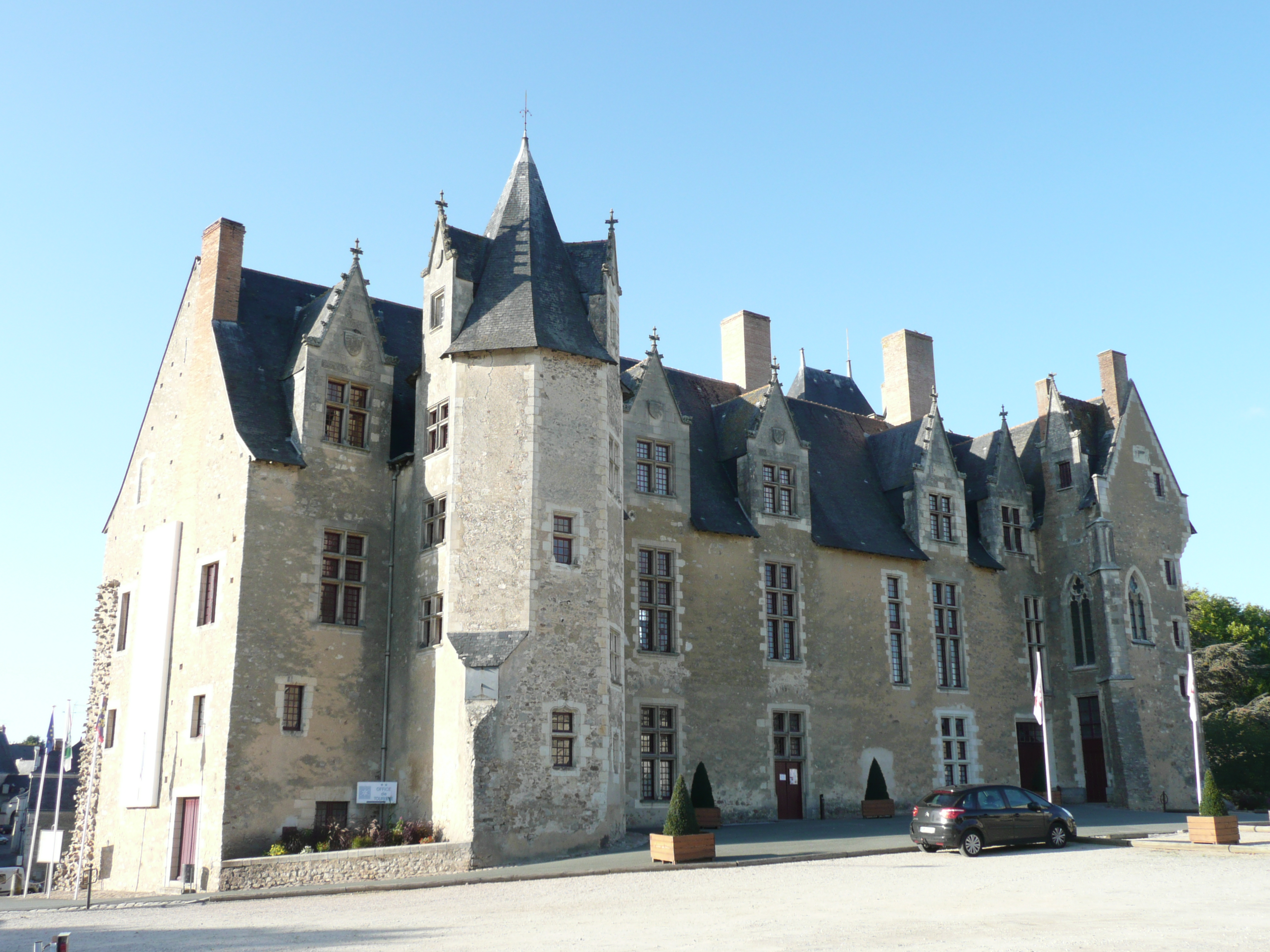
Exterior view (2011).

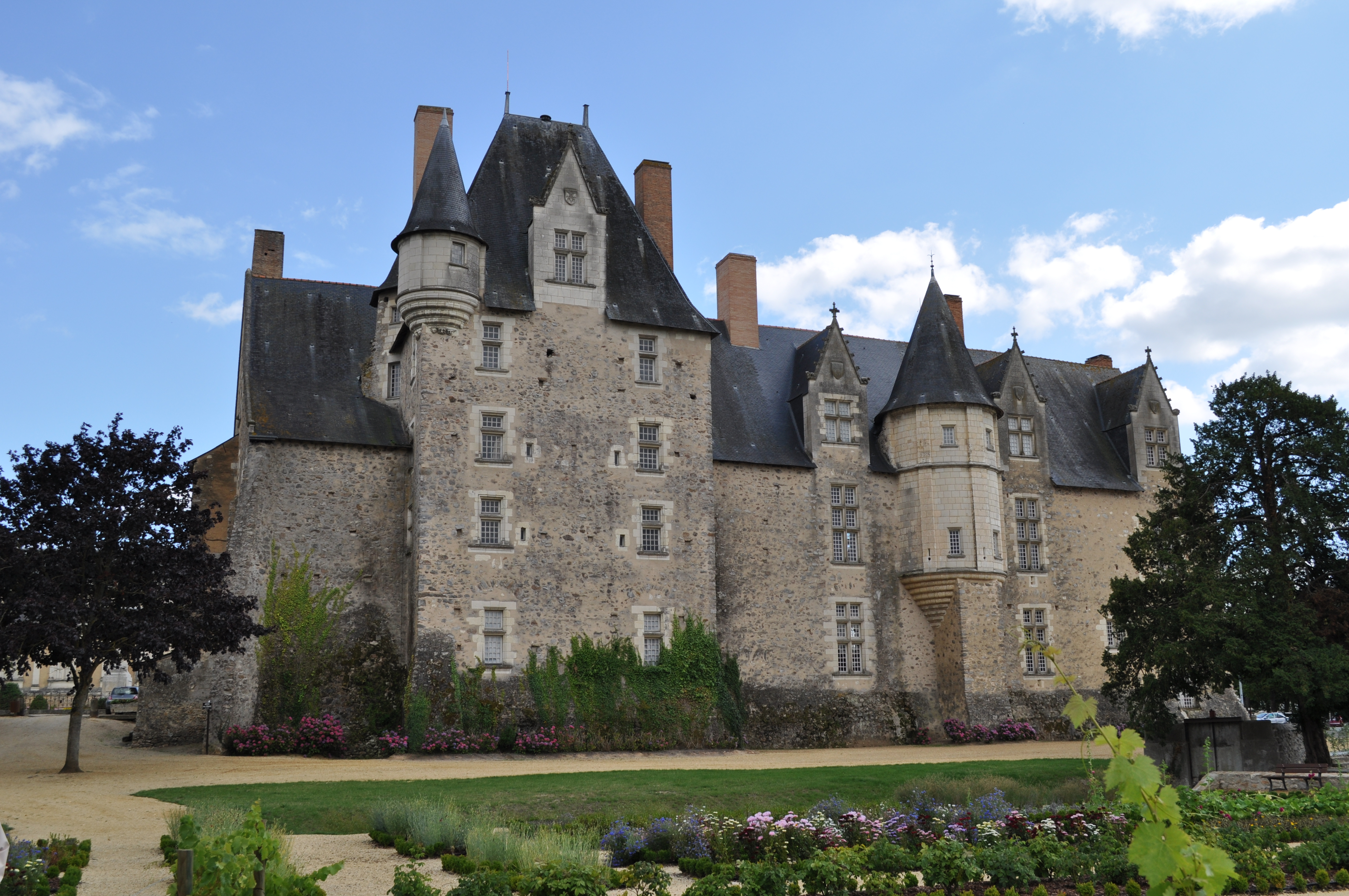
Rear façade (2011).

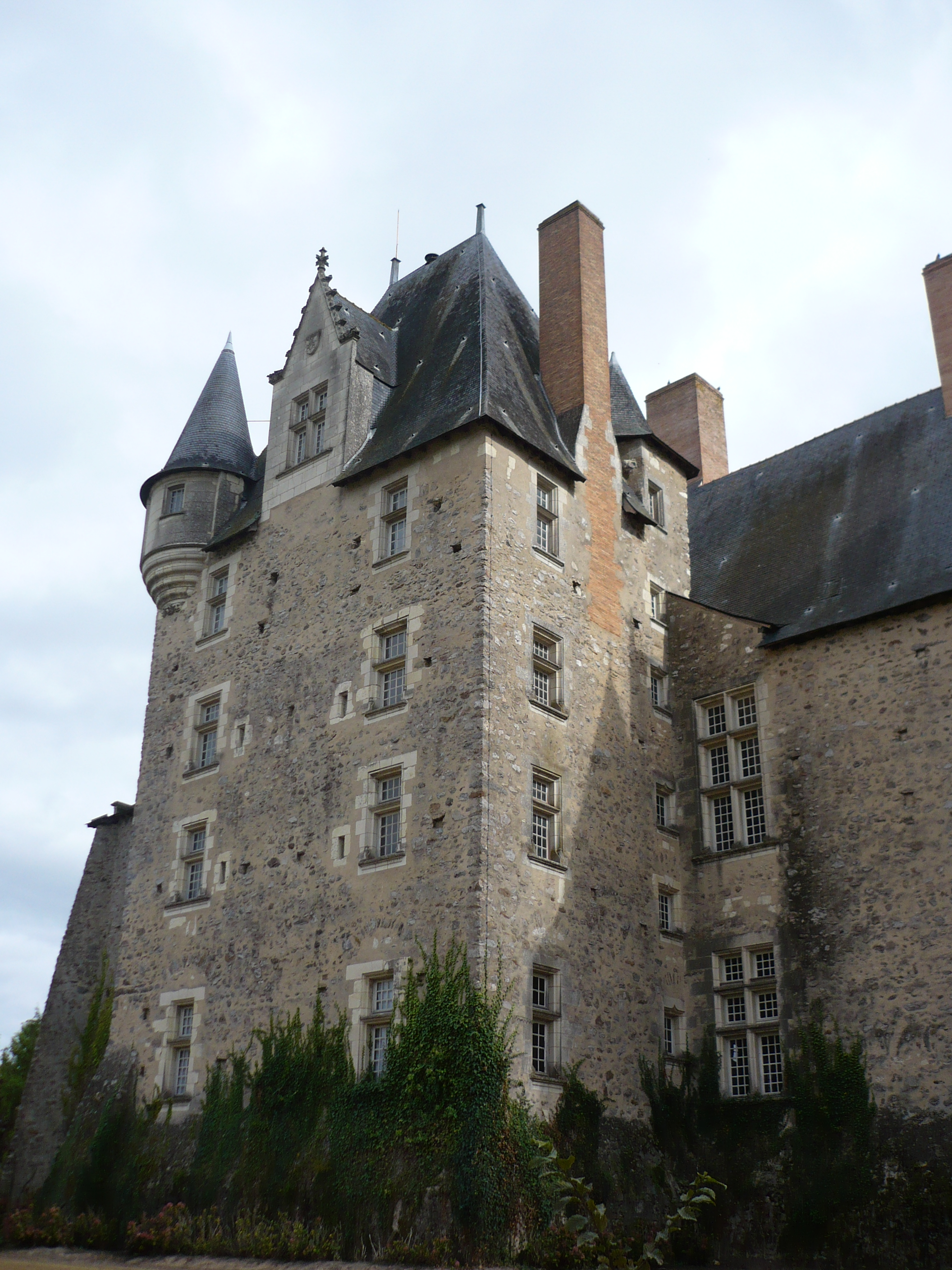
Tower.

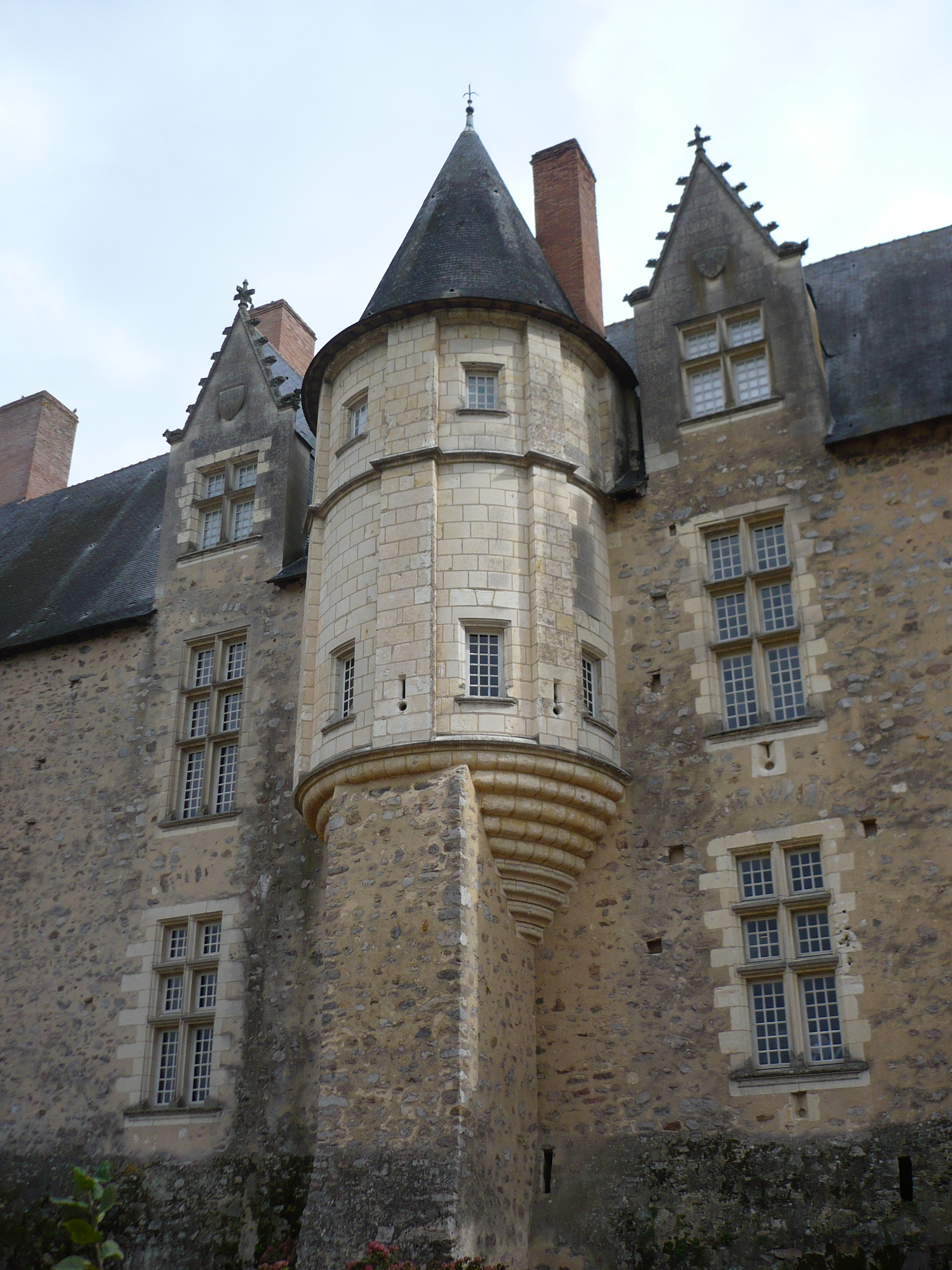
Retreat.

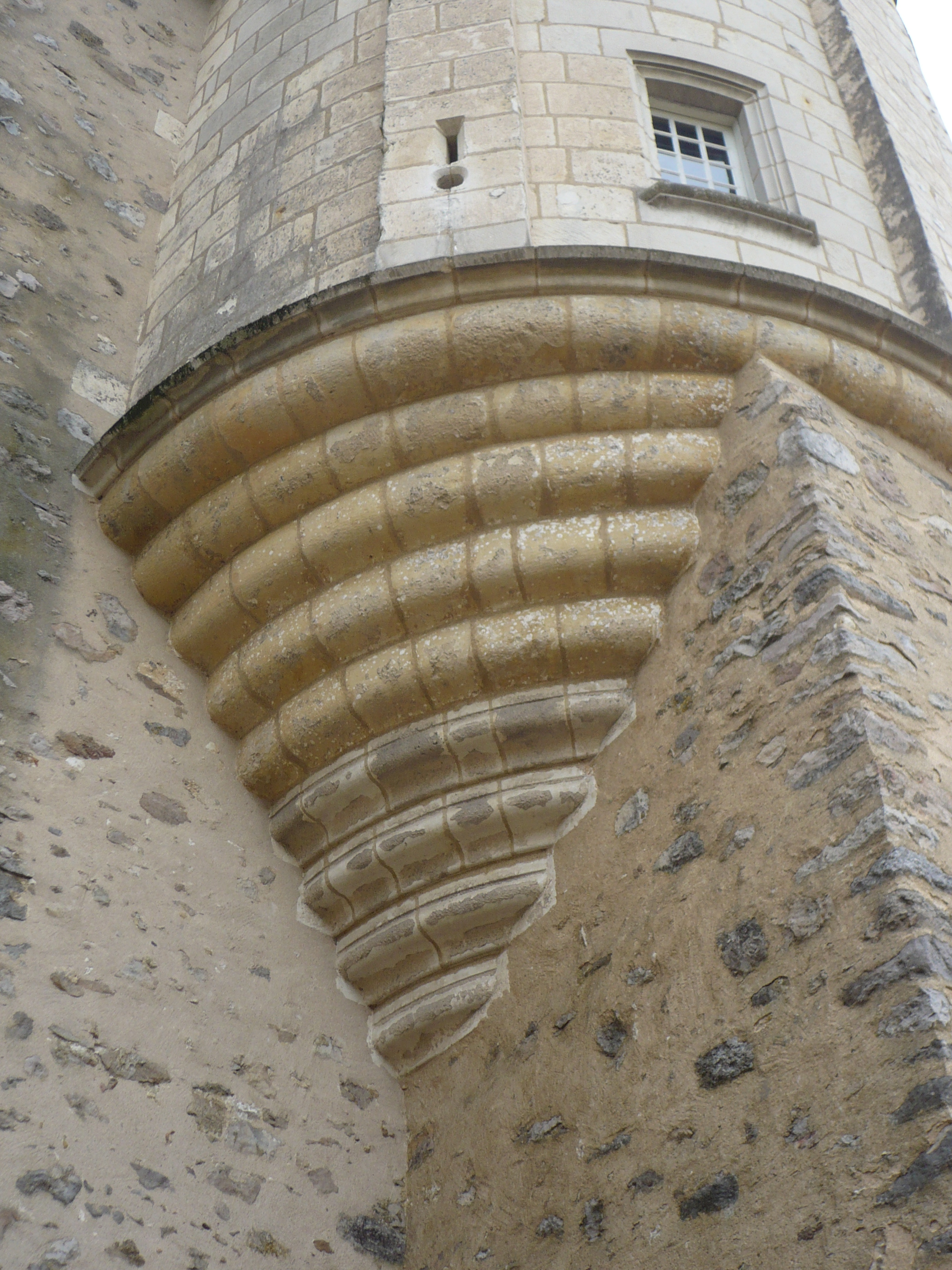
Corbelling.

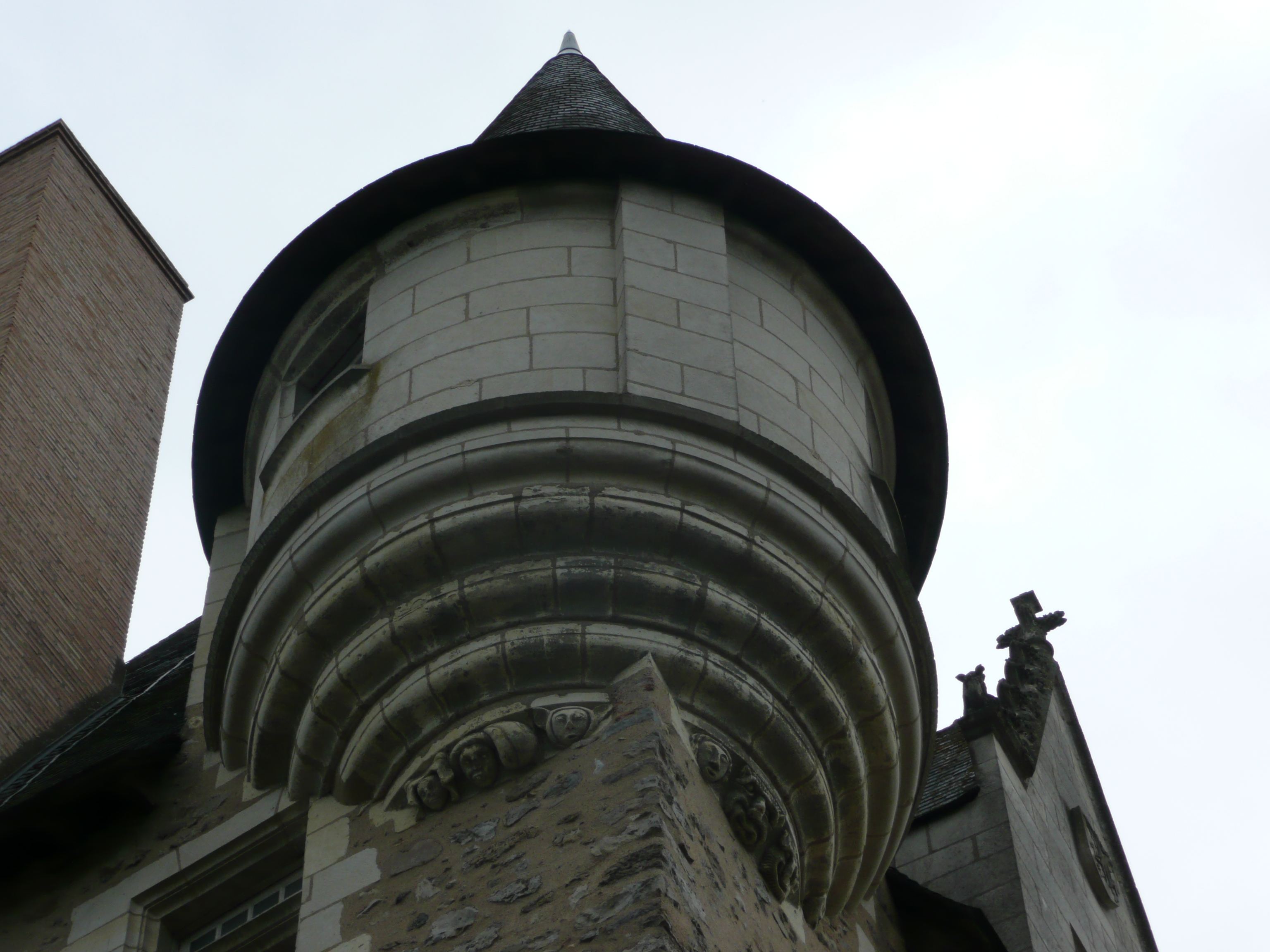
Bartizan.

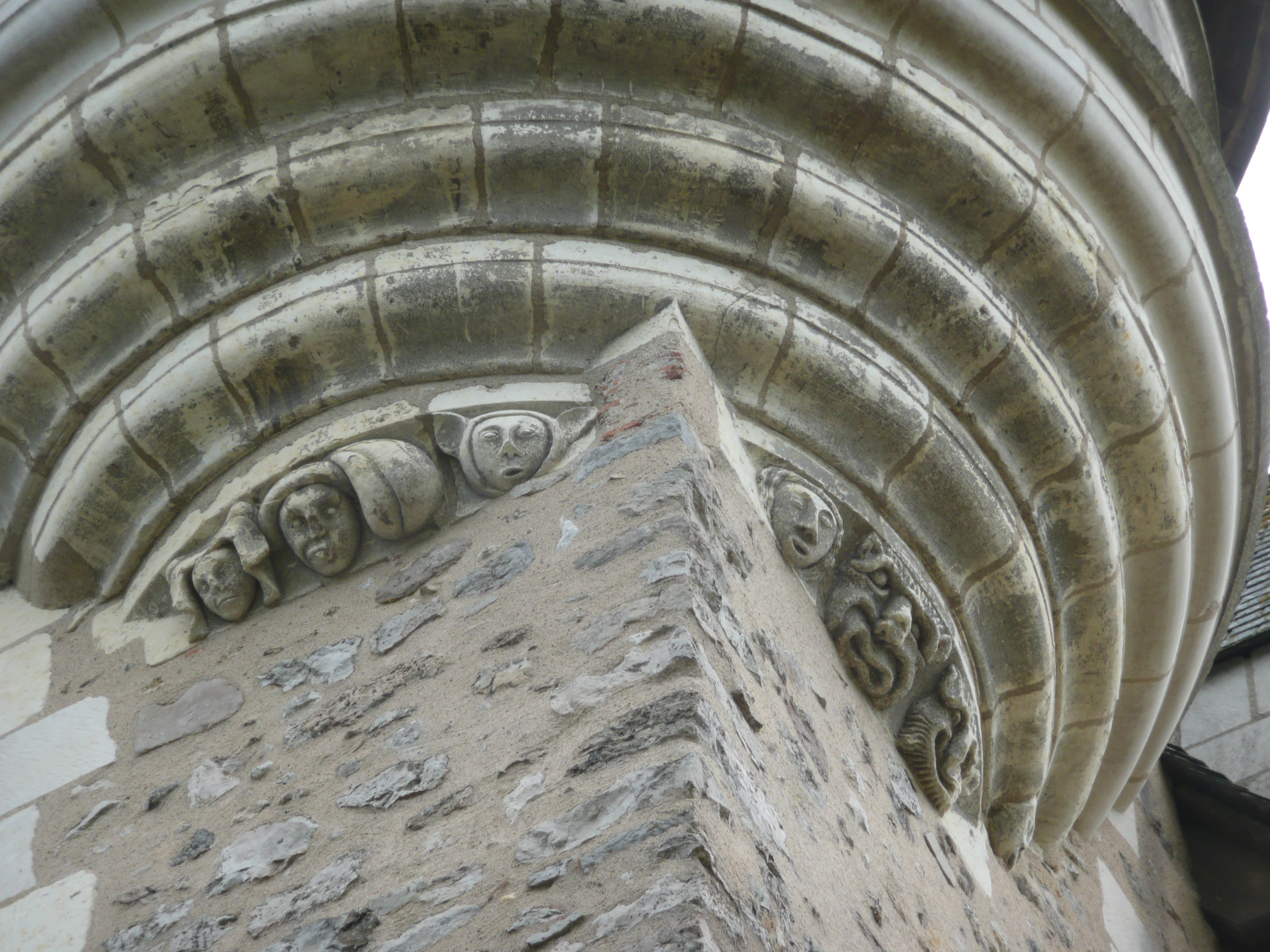
Echaugette (detail).

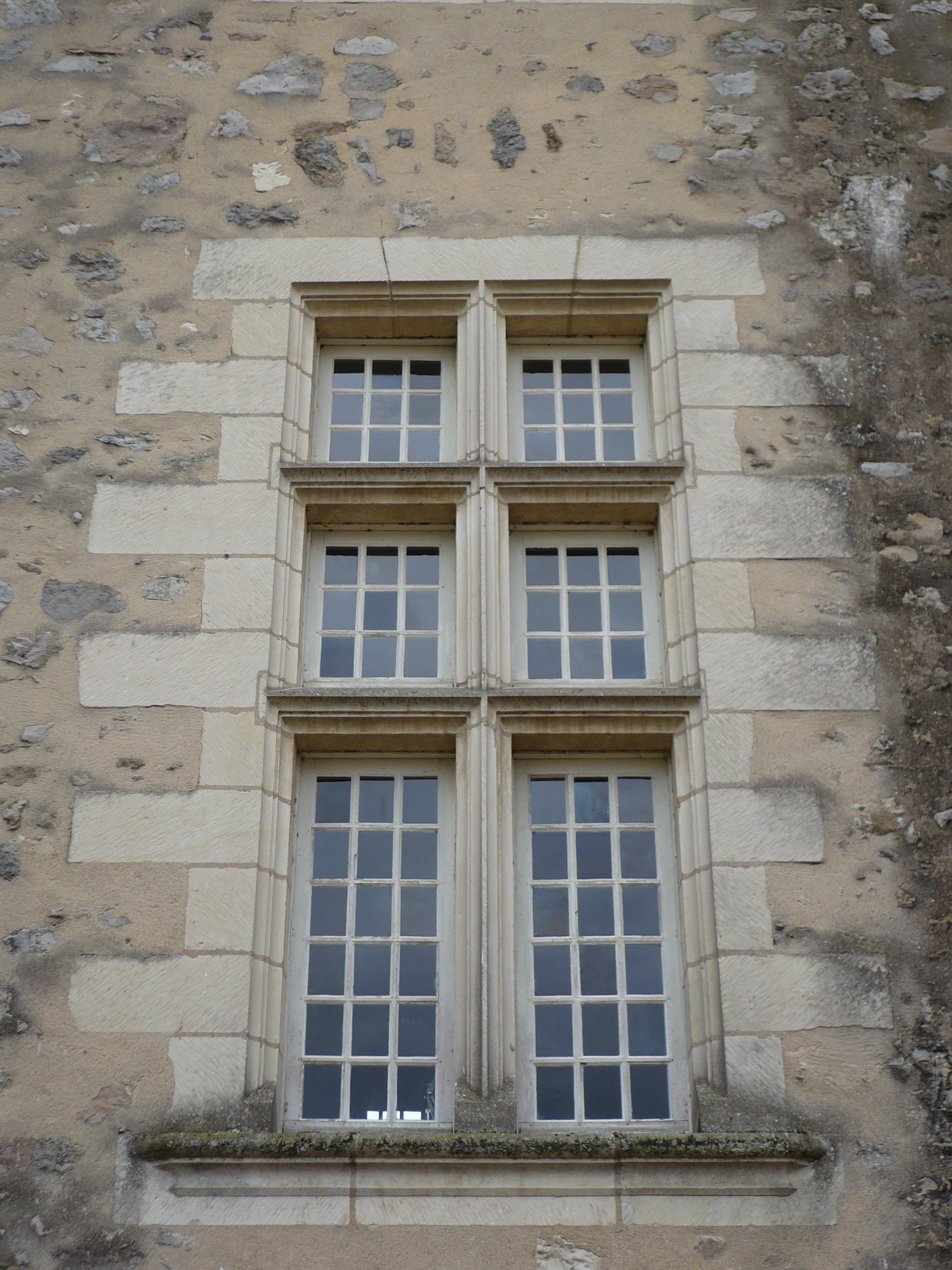
Window.

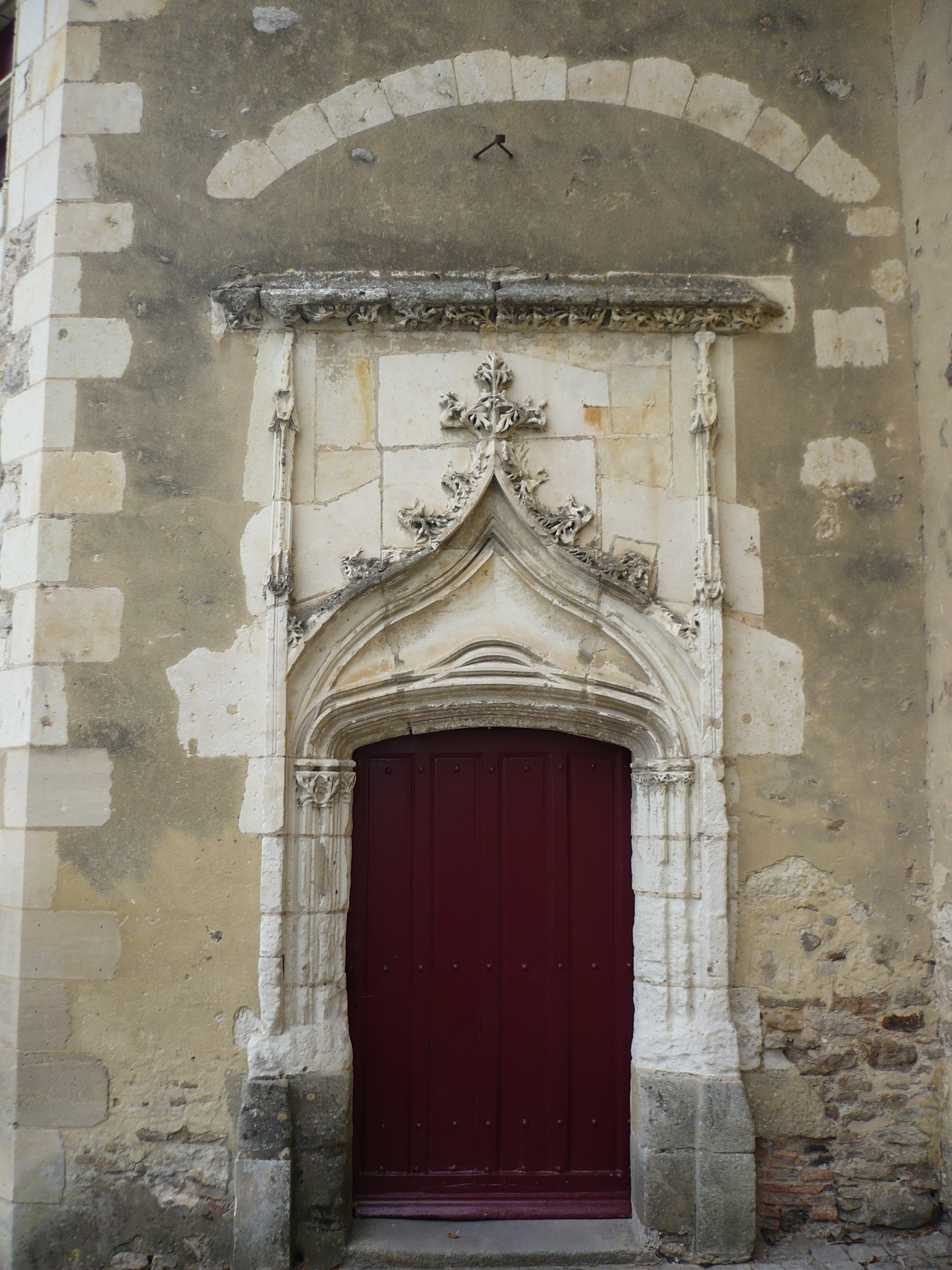
Doorway.

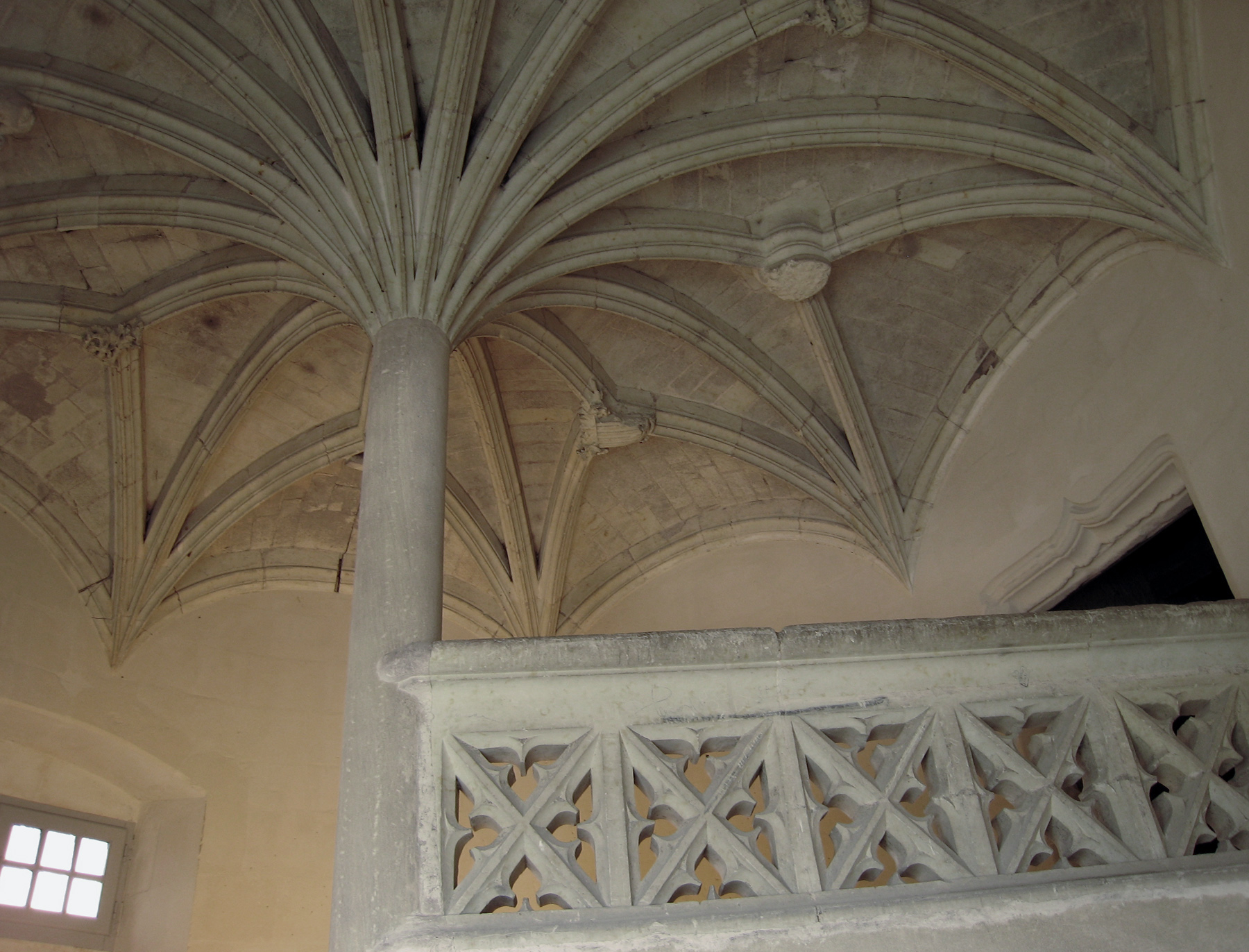
Stone staircase with central column and palm tree vaulting.

== See also ==
- List of castles in France
