= Le Vieil-Baugé =

- Part of Baugé-en-Anjou
- Coat of arms
- Location of Le Vieil-Baugé
- Location within France Location within Pays de la Loire
- Coordinates: 47°31′56″N 0°07′09″W
- Country: France
- Region: Pays de la Loire
- Department: Maine-et-Loire
- Arrondissement: Saumur
- Canton: Baugé
- Commune: Baugé-en-Anjou
- Area^{1}: 28.63 km^{2} (11.05 sq mi)
- Elevation: 52 m (171 ft)
- Highest elevation: 89 m (292 ft)
- Lowest elevation: 27 m (89 ft)
- Population (2022): 1,218
  - Density: 42.54/km^{2} (110.2/sq mi)
- Demonym(s): Vieil-Baugeois, Vieil-Baugeoise
- Time zone: UTC+01:00 (CET)
  - Summer (DST): UTC+02:00 (CEST)
- Postal code: 49150
- ^{1} French Land Register data, which excludes lakes, ponds, glaciers > 1 km^{2} (0.386 sq mi or 247 acres) and river estuaries.

Le Vieil-Baugé (French pronunciation: [lə vjɛj boʒe]) is a former commune in the Maine-et-Loire département in western France. On 1 January 2013, it was merged with the former communes of Baugé, Montpollin, Pontigné and Saint-Martin-d'Arcé to create the commune of Baugé-en-Anjou. Its population was 1,218 in 2022.

== See also ==
- Communes of the Maine-et-Loire department
