= Baugé-en-Anjou =

- Commune
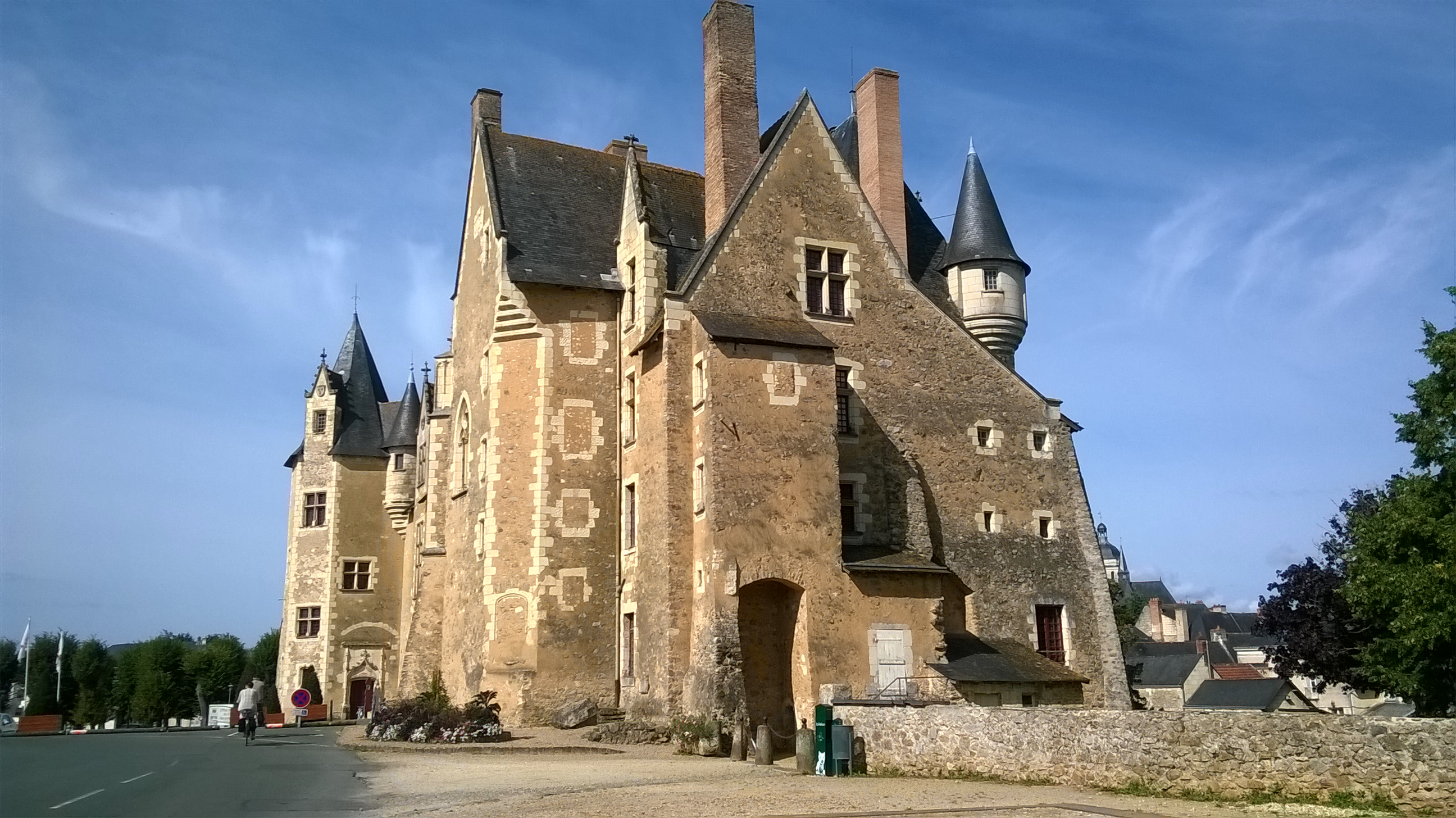
- The Château of Baugé
- Location of Baugé-en-Anjou
- Location within France Location within Pays de la Loire
- Coordinates: 47°32′31″N 0°06′11″W
- Country: France
- Region: Pays de la Loire
- Department: Maine-et-Loire
- Arrondissement: Saumur
- Canton: Beaufort-en-Anjou

Government
  - Mayor (2020–2026): Philippe Chalopin
- Area^{1}: 268.25 km^{2} (103.57 sq mi)
- Highest elevation: 102 m (335 ft)
- Lowest elevation: 27 m (89 ft)
- Population (2023): 11,712
  - Density: 43.661/km^{2} (113.08/sq mi)
- Time zone: UTC+01:00 (CET)
  - Summer (DST): UTC+02:00 (CEST)
- INSEE/Postal code: 49018 /49150
- ^{1} French Land Register data, which excludes lakes, ponds, glaciers > 1 km^{2} (0.386 sq mi or 247 acres) and river estuaries.

Baugé-en-Anjou (French pronunciation: [boʒe ɑ̃.n‿ɑ̃ʒu], literally Baugé in Anjou) is a commune in the Maine-et-Loire department in western France. This new commune was created on 1 January 2013 from the merger of five former communes, Baugé, Montpollin, Pontigné, Saint-Martin-d'Arcé and Le Vieil-Baugé, which became communes déléguées (lit. "delegated communes"). Its center is Baugé. On 1 January 2016, it was further expanded with the former communes Bocé, Chartrené, Cheviré-le-Rouge, Clefs-Val d'Anjou, Cuon, Échemiré, Fougeré, Le Guédeniau and Saint-Quentin-lès-Beaurepaire. Clefs-Val d'Anjou was the result of the merger, on 1 January 2013, of the former communes Clefs and Vaulandry.

== Population ==
Historical population
| Year | Pop. | ±% p.a. |
|---|---|---|
| 1968 | 10,864 | — |
| 1975 | 10,313 | −0.74% |
| 1982 | 10,441 | +0.18% |
| 1990 | 10,329 | −0.13% |
| 1999 | 10,516 | +0.20% |
| 2007 | 11,232 | +0.83% |
| 2012 | 11,833 | +1.05% |
| 2017 | 11,892 | +0.10% |
| 2023 | 11,712 | −0.25% |
Populations of the area corresponding with the commune of Baugé-en-Anjou at 1 January 2025. Source: INSEE

== See also ==
- Communes of the Maine-et-Loire department
