= Saint-Quentin-lès-Beaurepaire =

- Part of Baugé-en-Anjou
- Location of Saint-Quentin-lès-Beaurepaire
- Location within France Location within Pays de la Loire
- Coordinates: 47°37′41″N 0°06′24″W
- Country: France
- Region: Pays de la Loire
- Department: Maine-et-Loire
- Arrondissement: Saumur
- Canton: Baugé
- Commune: Baugé-en-Anjou
- Area^{1}: 7.51 km^{2} (2.90 sq mi)
- Elevation: 44 m (144 ft)
- Highest elevation: 66 m (217 ft)
- Lowest elevation: 31 m (102 ft)
- Population (2022): 276
  - Density: 36.8/km^{2} (95.2/sq mi)
- Time zone: UTC+01:00 (CET)
  - Summer (DST): UTC+02:00 (CEST)
- Postal code: 49150
- ^{1} French Land Register data, which excludes lakes, ponds, glaciers > 1 km^{2} (0.386 sq mi or 247 acres) and river estuaries.

Saint-Quentin-lès-Beaurepaire (French pronunciation: [sɛ̃ kɑ̃tɛ̃ lɛ boʁpɛʁ]) is a former commune in the Maine-et-Loire department in western France. On 1 January 2016, it was merged into the commune of Baugé-en-Anjou. Its population was 276 in 2022.

== See also ==
- Communes of the Maine-et-Loire department
