= Lasse (disambiguation) =

Lasse is a male Scandinavian given name.

Lasse may also refer to:

== Places ==
- Lasse, Maine-et-Loire, France, a commune
- Lasse, Pyrénées-Atlantiques, France, a commune

== People ==
- Dick Lasse (born 1935), American former National Football League player and former college football coach
- Kurt Lasse (1918–1941), German World War II Luftwaffe ace
