= Breil, Maine-et-Loire =

Breil
- Part of Noyant-Villages
- Location of Breil
- Location within France Location within Pays de la Loire
- Coordinates: 47°28′32″N 0°09′29″E
- Country: France
- Region: Pays de la Loire
- Department: Maine-et-Loire
- Arrondissement: Saumur
- Canton: Beaufort-en-Vallée
- Commune: Noyant-Villages
- Area^{1}: 15.09 km^{2} (5.83 sq mi)
- Elevation: 81 m (266 ft)
- Highest elevation: 119 m (390 ft)
- Lowest elevation: 60 m (200 ft)
- Population (2023): 240
  - Density: 16/km^{2} (41/sq mi)
- Time zone: UTC+01:00 (CET)
  - Summer (DST): UTC+02:00 (CEST)
- Postal code: 49490
- ^{1} French Land Register data, which excludes lakes, ponds, glaciers > 1 km^{2} (0.386 sq mi or 247 acres) and river estuaries.

Breil (French pronunciation: [bʁɛj]) is a former commune in the Maine-et-Loire department in western France. On 15 December 2016, it was merged into the new commune Noyant-Villages. The inhabitants are known as Breillois in French. Breil's nearest town is Noyant (6 km).

== Sights ==
Breil is most famous for its Chateau in the Parc du Lathan, where a major Fête de la Chasse (Hunting Fair) was held each August 15. Breil is near the Lac de Rillé, a lake stretching from Rillé to Gué Morin, a hamlet in Breil, where the River Lathan was dammed in 1978 principally for irrigating the valley of the Authion.

== See also ==
- Communes of the Maine-et-Loire department
