= Broc, Maine-et-Loire =

Broc
- Part of Noyant-Villages
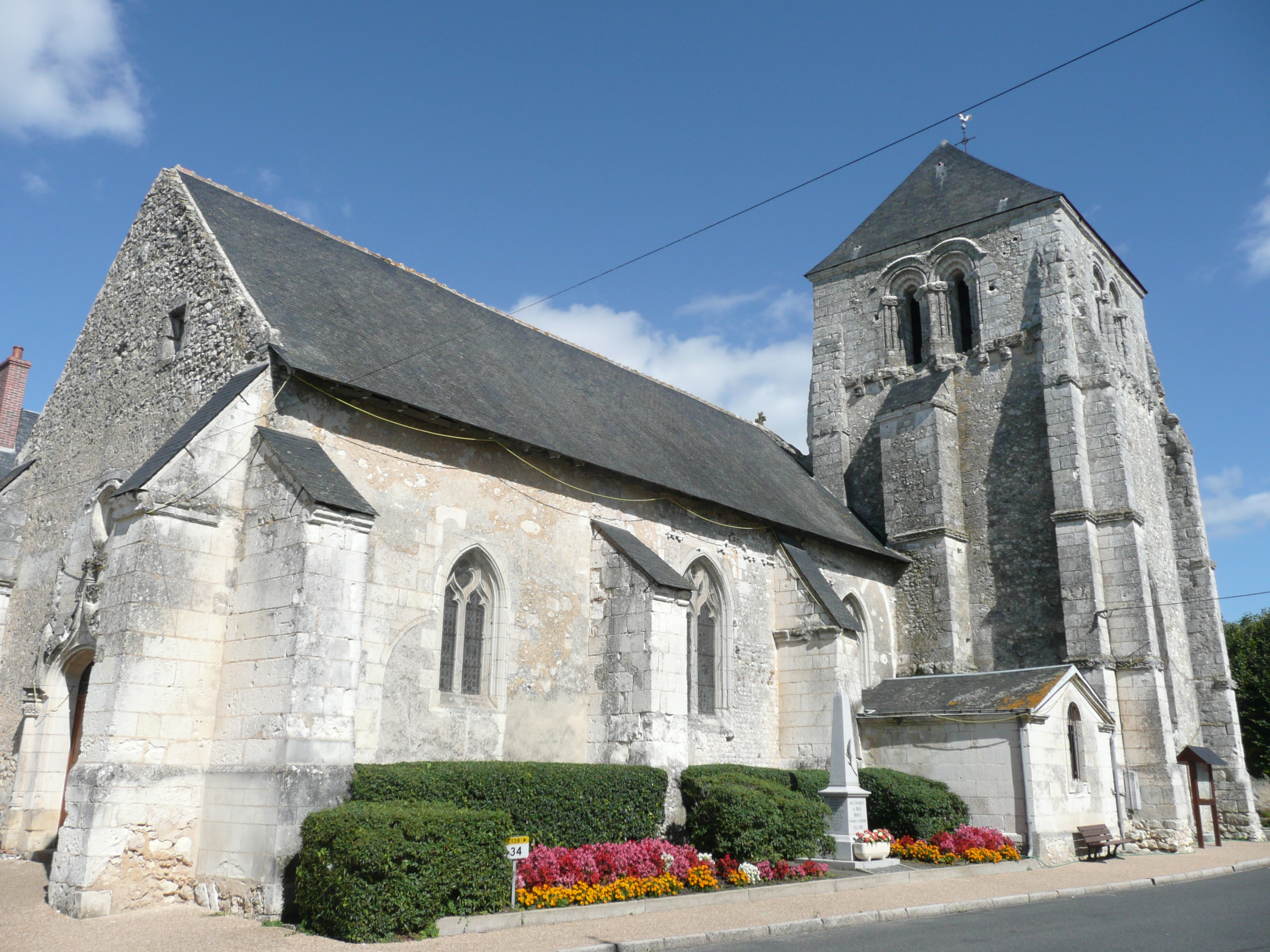
- The church in Broc
- Location of Broc
- Location within France Location within Pays de la Loire
- Coordinates: 47°34′50″N 0°10′02″E
- Country: France
- Region: Pays de la Loire
- Department: Maine-et-Loire
- Arrondissement: Saumur
- Canton: Beaufort-en-Vallée
- Commune: Noyant-Villages
- Area^{1}: 21.23 km^{2} (8.20 sq mi)
- Elevation: 115 m (377 ft)
- Highest elevation: 117 m (384 ft)
- Lowest elevation: 40 m (130 ft)
- Population (2023): 299
  - Density: 14.1/km^{2} (36.5/sq mi)
- Time zone: UTC+01:00 (CET)
  - Summer (DST): UTC+02:00 (CEST)
- Postal code: 49490
- ^{1} French Land Register data, which excludes lakes, ponds, glaciers > 1 km^{2} (0.386 sq mi or 247 acres) and river estuaries.

Broc (French pronunciation: [bʁo]) is a former commune in the Maine-et-Loire department in western France. On 15 December 2016, it was merged into the new commune Noyant-Villages. It is between Le Mans, Tours and Angers (roughly 40–50 km from each).

== See also ==
- Communes of the Maine-et-Loire department
