= Meigné-le-Vicomte =

- Part of Noyant-Villages
- Coat of arms
- Location of Meigné-le-Vicomte
- Location within France Location within Pays de la Loire
- Coordinates: 47°30′36″N 0°11′32″E
- Country: France
- Region: Pays de la Loire
- Department: Maine-et-Loire
- Arrondissement: Saumur
- Canton: Beaufort-en-Vallée
- Commune: Noyant-Villages
- Area^{1}: 23.13 km^{2} (8.93 sq mi)
- Elevation: 89 m (292 ft)
- Highest elevation: 96 m (315 ft)
- Lowest elevation: 71 m (233 ft)
- Population (2022): 297
  - Density: 12.8/km^{2} (33.3/sq mi)
- Demonym(s): Meignéen, Meignéenne
- Time zone: UTC+01:00 (CET)
  - Summer (DST): UTC+02:00 (CEST)
- Postal code: 49490
- ^{1} French Land Register data, which excludes lakes, ponds, glaciers > 1 km^{2} (0.386 sq mi or 247 acres) and river estuaries.

Meigné-le-Vicomte (French pronunciation: [mɛɲe lə vikɔ̃t]) is a former commune in the Maine-et-Loire department in western France. On 15 December 2016, it was merged into the new commune Noyant-Villages.

== See also ==
- Communes of the Maine-et-Loire department
