= Chalonnes =

Chalonnes is part of the name of two communes in France:

- Chalonnes-sous-le-Lude, in the Maine-et-Loire département
- Chalonnes-sur-Loire, in the Maine-et-Loire département
