= Mazé =

Commune in Maine-et-Loire, France

- Part of Mazé-Milon
- Coat of arms
- Location of Mazé
- Location within France Location within Pays de la Loire
- Coordinates: 47°27′25″N 0°16′18″W
- Country: France
- Region: Pays de la Loire
- Department: Maine-et-Loire
- Arrondissement: Saumur
- Canton: Beaufort-en-Vallée
- Commune: Mazé-Milon
- Area^{1}: 33.33 km^{2} (12.87 sq mi)
- Highest elevation: 53 m (174 ft)
- Lowest elevation: 18 m (59 ft)
- Population (2022): 5,193
  - Density: 155.8/km^{2} (403.5/sq mi)
- Demonym(s): Mazéiais, Mazéiaise
- Time zone: UTC+01:00 (CET)
  - Summer (DST): UTC+02:00 (CEST)
- Postal code: 49630
- ^{1} French Land Register data, which excludes lakes, ponds, glaciers > 1 km^{2} (0.386 sq mi or 247 acres) and river estuaries.

Mazé (French pronunciation: [maze]) is a former commune in the Maine-et-Loire department in western France. On 1 January 2016, it was merged into the new commune of Mazé-Milon.

== See also ==
- Communes of the Maine-et-Loire department
