= Parçay-les-Pins =

- Part of Noyant-Villages
- Coat of arms
- Location of Parçay-les-Pins
- Location within France Location within Pays de la Loire
- Coordinates: 47°26′17″N 0°09′37″E
- Country: France
- Region: Pays de la Loire
- Department: Maine-et-Loire
- Arrondissement: Saumur
- Canton: Beaufort-en-Vallée
- Commune: Noyant-Villages
- Area^{1}: 27.85 km^{2} (10.75 sq mi)
- Elevation: 75 m (246 ft)
- Highest elevation: 119 m (390 ft)
- Lowest elevation: 48 m (157 ft)
- Population (2022): 791
  - Density: 28.4/km^{2} (73.6/sq mi)
- Demonym(s): Parçayais, Parçayaise; Parcéens, Parcéenne
- Time zone: UTC+01:00 (CET)
  - Summer (DST): UTC+02:00 (CEST)
- Postal code: 49390
- ^{1} French Land Register data, which excludes lakes, ponds, glaciers > 1 km^{2} (0.386 sq mi or 247 acres) and river estuaries.

Parçay-les-Pins (French pronunciation: [paʁsɛ le pɛ̃]) is a former commune in the Maine-et-Loire department in western France. On 15 December 2016, it was merged into the new commune Noyant-Villages.

== See also ==
- Communes of the Maine-et-Loire department
