= Brion, Maine-et-Loire =

Brion
- Part of Les Bois-d'Anjou
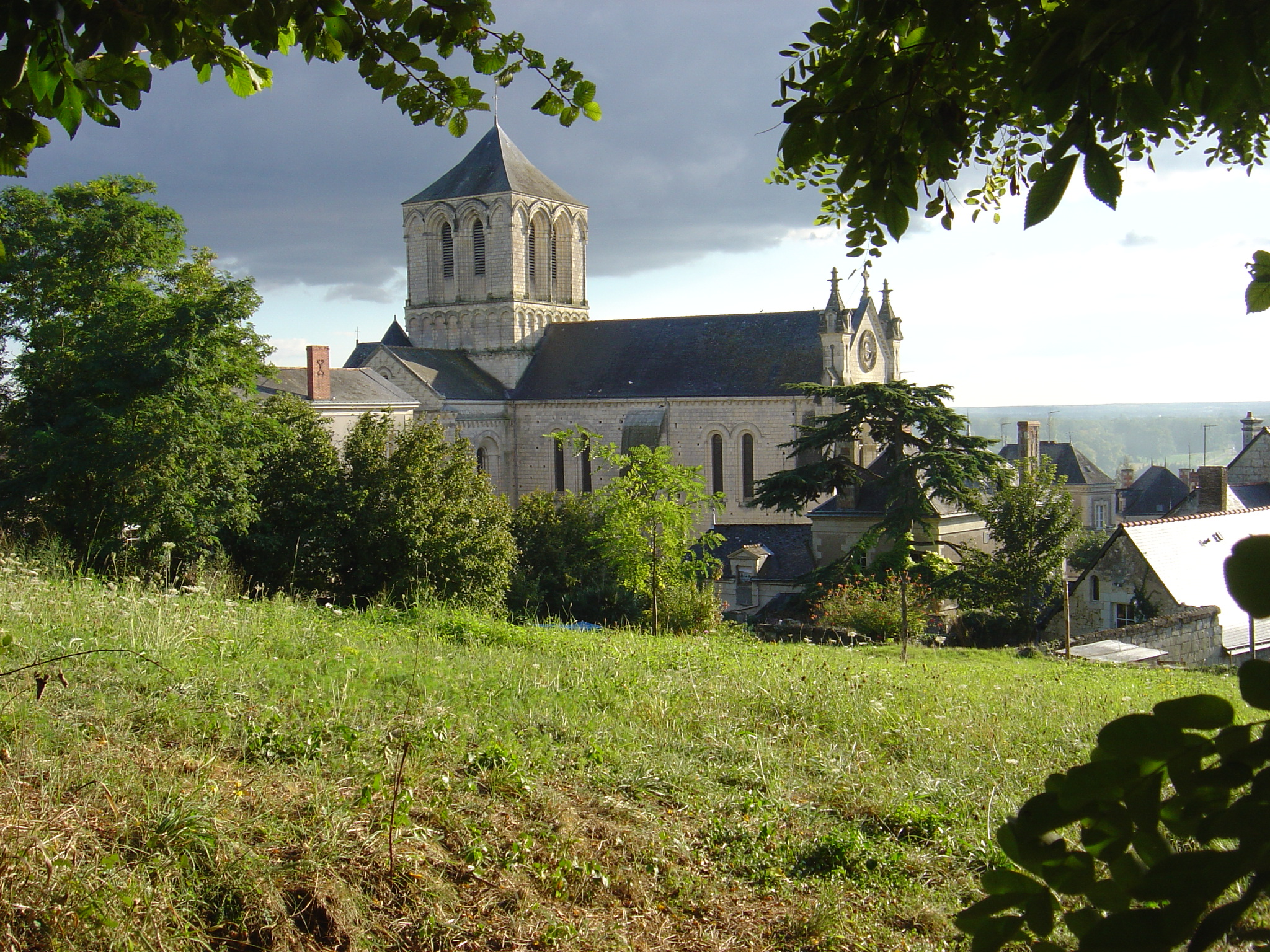
- Location of Brion
- Location within France Location within Pays de la Loire
- Coordinates: 47°26′33″N 0°09′21″W
- Country: France
- Region: Pays de la Loire
- Department: Maine-et-Loire
- Arrondissement: Saumur
- Canton: Beaufort-en-Vallée
- Commune: Les Bois-d'Anjou
- Area^{1}: 28.29 km^{2} (10.92 sq mi)
- Elevation: 85 m (279 ft)
- Highest elevation: 88 m (289 ft)
- Lowest elevation: 21 m (69 ft)
- Population (2022): 1,156
  - Density: 40.86/km^{2} (105.8/sq mi)
- Time zone: UTC+01:00 (CET)
  - Summer (DST): UTC+02:00 (CEST)
- Postal code: 49250
- ^{1} French Land Register data, which excludes lakes, ponds, glaciers > 1 km^{2} (0.386 sq mi or 247 acres) and river estuaries.

Brion (French pronunciation: [bʁijɔ̃]) is a former commune in the Maine-et-Loire department in western France. On 1 January 2016, it was merged into the new commune of Les Bois-d'Anjou.

== Population ==
Historical population

Year	Pop.	±% p.a.
1793	1,434	—
1800	1,371	−0.64%
1806	1,503	+1.54%
1821	1,573	+0.30%
1831	1,610	+0.23%
1836	1,634	+0.30%
1841	1,682	+0.58%
1846	1,650	−0.38%
1851	1,598	−0.64%
1856	1,533	−0.83%
1861	1,486	−0.62%
1866	1,526	+0.53%
1872	1,558	+0.35%
1876	1,533	−0.40%
1881	1,566	+0.43%
1886	1,520	−0.59%
1891	1,507	−0.17%
1896	1,517	+0.13%

Year	Pop.	±% p.a.
1901	1,534	+0.22%
1906	1,416	−1.59%
1911	1,387	−0.41%
1921	1,153	−1.83%
1926	1,158	+0.09%
1931	1,166	+0.14%
1936	1,167	+0.02%
1946	1,166	−0.01%
1954	1,147	−0.21%
1962	1,109	−0.42%
1968	1,087	−0.33%
1975	980	−1.47%
1982	875	−1.61%
1990	916	+0.57%
1999	1,021	+1.21%
2006	1,066	+0.62%
2022	1,156	+0.51%

Source: EHESS and INSEE

== See also ==
- Communes of the Maine-et-Loire department
