= Fontaine-Milon =

- Part of Mazé-Milon
- Location of Fontaine-Milon
- Location within France Location within Pays de la Loire
- Coordinates: 47°30′09″N 0°14′48″W
- Country: France
- Region: Pays de la Loire
- Department: Maine-et-Loire
- Arrondissement: Saumur
- Canton: Beaufort-en-Vallée
- Commune: Mazé-Milon
- Area^{1}: 8.46 km^{2} (3.27 sq mi)
- Highest elevation: 88 m (289 ft)
- Lowest elevation: 31 m (102 ft)
- Population (2022): 577
  - Density: 68.2/km^{2} (177/sq mi)
- Demonym(s): Milonnais, Milonnaise
- Time zone: UTC+01:00 (CET)
  - Summer (DST): UTC+02:00 (CEST)
- Postal code: 49140
- ^{1} French Land Register data, which excludes lakes, ponds, glaciers > 1 km^{2} (0.386 sq mi or 247 acres) and river estuaries.

Fontaine-Milon (French pronunciation: [fɔ̃tɛn milɔ̃]) is a former commune in the Maine-et-Loire department in western France. On 1 January 2016, it was merged into the new commune of Mazé-Milon.

== See also ==
- Communes of the Maine-et-Loire department
