= Auverse =

- Part of Noyant-Villages
- Location of Auverse
- Location within France Location within Pays de la Loire
- Coordinates: 47°31′08″N 0°03′07″E
- Country: France
- Region: Pays de la Loire
- Department: Maine-et-Loire
- Arrondissement: Saumur
- Canton: Beaufort-en-Vallée
- Commune: Noyant-Villages
- Area^{1}: 30.74 km^{2} (11.87 sq mi)
- Elevation: 85 m (279 ft)
- Highest elevation: 102 m (335 ft)
- Lowest elevation: 55 m (180 ft)
- Population (2023): 437
  - Density: 14.2/km^{2} (36.8/sq mi)
- Time zone: UTC+01:00 (CET)
  - Summer (DST): UTC+02:00 (CEST)
- Postal code: 49490
- ^{1} French Land Register data, which excludes lakes, ponds, glaciers > 1 km^{2} (0.386 sq mi or 247 acres) and river estuaries.

Auverse (French pronunciation: [ovɛʁs]) is a former commune in the Maine-et-Loire department in western France. On 15 December 2016, it was merged into the new commune Noyant-Villages.

== See also ==
- Communes of the Maine-et-Loire department
