= Beaufort-en-Vallée =

- Part of Beaufort-en-Anjou
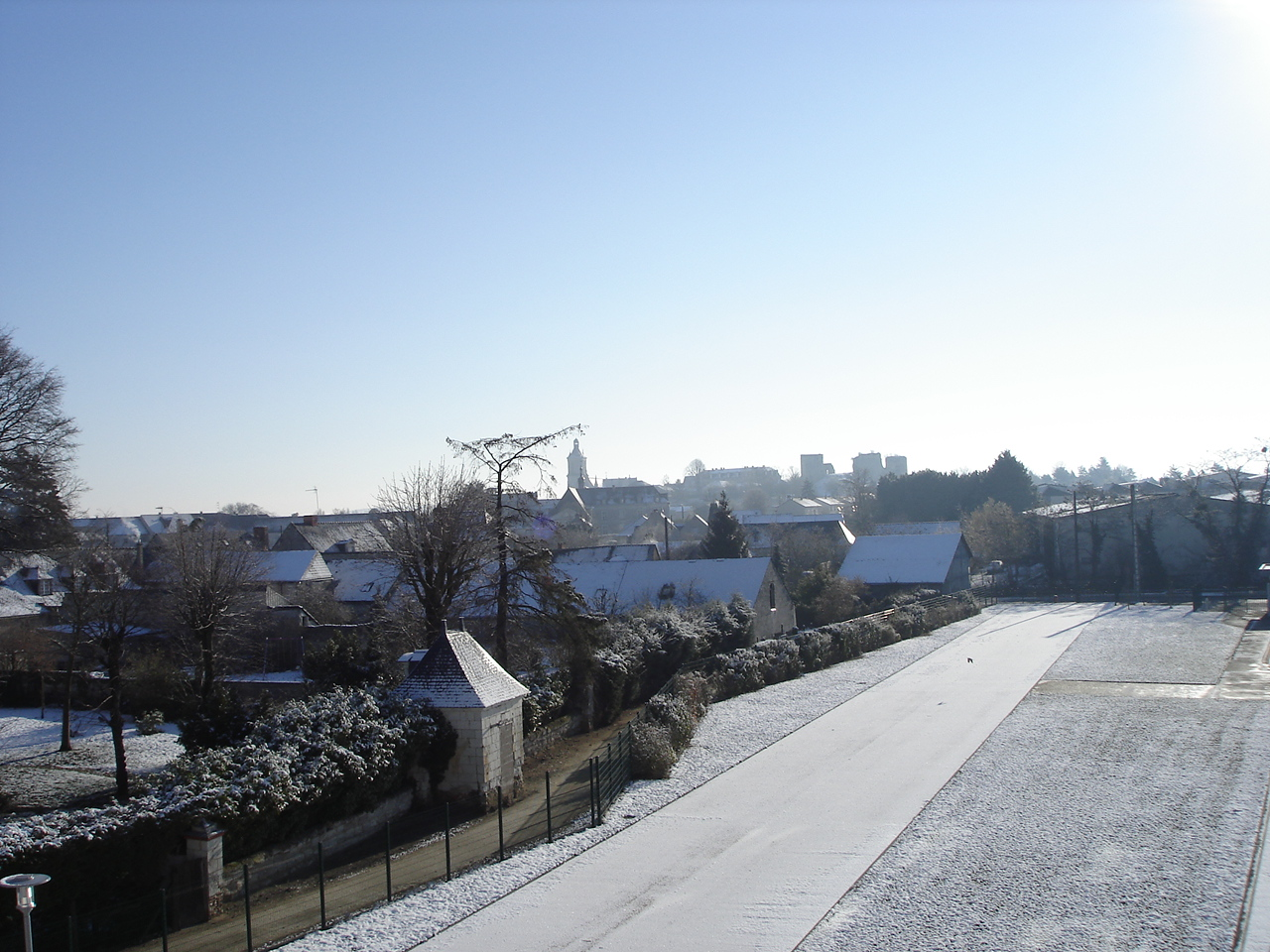

- Coat of arms
- Location of Beaufort-en-Vallée
- Location within France Location within Pays de la Loire
- Coordinates: 47°26′25″N 0°12′51″W
- Country: France
- Region: Pays de la Loire
- Department: Maine-et-Loire
- Arrondissement: Angers
- Canton: Beaufort-en-Vallée
- Commune: Beaufort-en-Anjou
- Area^{1}: 35.66 km^{2} (13.77 sq mi)
- Elevation: 25 m (82 ft)
- Highest elevation: 51 m (167 ft)
- Lowest elevation: 17 m (56 ft)
- Population (2022): 6,447
  - Density: 180.8/km^{2} (468.2/sq mi)
- Time zone: UTC+01:00 (CET)
  - Summer (DST): UTC+02:00 (CEST)
- Postal code: 49250
- ^{1} French Land Register data, which excludes lakes, ponds, glaciers > 1 km^{2} (0.386 sq mi or 247 acres) and river estuaries.

Beaufort-en-Vallée (French pronunciation: [bofɔʁ ɑ̃ vale]) is a former commune in the Maine-et-Loire department in western France. On 1 January 2016, it was merged into the new commune of Beaufort-en-Anjou.

== Population ==
Historical population

Year	Pop.	±% p.a.
1793	6,214	—
1800	5,990	−0.52%
1806	5,958	−0.09%
1821	5,972	+0.02%
1831	5,914	−0.10%
1836	5,993	+0.27%
1841	5,474	−1.80%
1846	5,423	−0.19%
1851	5,207	−0.81%
1856	5,245	+0.15%
1861	5,260	+0.06%
1866	5,120	−0.54%
1872	5,146	+0.08%
1876	4,960	−0.92%
1881	4,757	−0.83%
1886	4,627	−0.55%
1891	4,492	−0.59%
1896	4,278	−0.97%

Year	Pop.	±% p.a.
1901	4,222	−0.26%
1906	4,104	−0.57%
1911	4,038	−0.32%
1921	3,387	−1.74%
1926	3,325	−0.37%
1931	3,262	−0.38%
1936	3,171	−0.56%
1946	3,306	+0.42%
1954	3,253	−0.20%
1962	3,544	+1.08%
1968	3,623	+0.37%
1975	4,048	+1.60%
1982	4,720	+2.22%
1990	5,364	+1.61%
1999	5,390	+0.05%
2006	5,623	+0.61%
2013	6,523	+2.14%
2022	6,447	−0.13%

Source: EHESS and INSEE

== See also ==
- Communes of the Maine-et-Loire department
