= Fontaine-Guérin =

- Part of Les Bois-d'Anjou
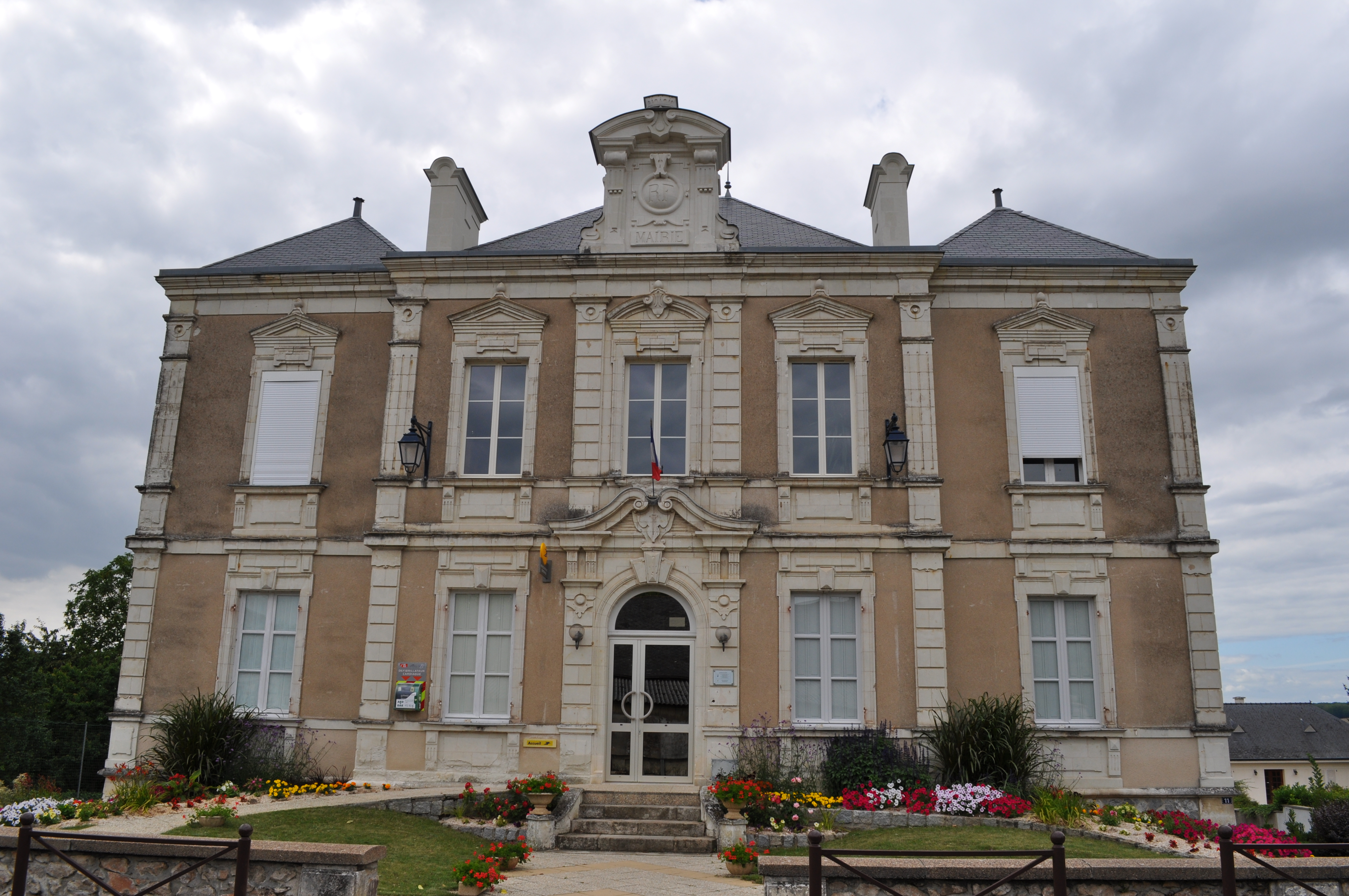
- Town Hall
- Location of Fontaine-Guérin
- Location within France Location within Pays de la Loire
- Coordinates: 47°29′16″N 0°11′17″W
- Country: France
- Region: Pays de la Loire
- Department: Maine-et-Loire
- Arrondissement: Saumur
- Canton: Beaufort-en-Vallée
- Commune: Les Bois-d'Anjou
- Area^{1}: 22.51 km^{2} (8.69 sq mi)
- Elevation: 52 m (171 ft)
- Highest elevation: 90 m (300 ft)
- Lowest elevation: 21 m (69 ft)
- Population (2022): 930
  - Density: 41/km^{2} (110/sq mi)
- Time zone: UTC+01:00 (CET)
  - Summer (DST): UTC+02:00 (CEST)
- Postal code: 49250
- ^{1} French Land Register data, which excludes lakes, ponds, glaciers > 1 km^{2} (0.386 sq mi or 247 acres) and river estuaries.

Fontaine-Guérin (French pronunciation: [fɔ̃tɛn ɡeʁɛ̃]) is a former commune in the Maine-et-Loire department in western France. On 1 January 2016, it was merged into the new commune of Les Bois-d'Anjou.

== See also ==
- Communes of the Maine-et-Loire department
