= Linières-Bouton =

- Part of Noyant-Villages
- Location of Linières-Bouton
- Location within France Location within Pays de la Loire
- Coordinates: 47°27′42″N 0°04′41″E
- Country: France
- Region: Pays de la Loire
- Department: Maine-et-Loire
- Arrondissement: Saumur
- Canton: Beaufort-en-Vallée
- Commune: Noyant-Villages
- Area^{1}: 9.89 km^{2} (3.82 sq mi)
- Elevation: 59 m (194 ft)
- Highest elevation: 78 m (256 ft)
- Lowest elevation: 44 m (144 ft)
- Population (2022): 89
  - Density: 9.0/km^{2} (23/sq mi)
- Demonym(s): Liniérois, Liniéroise
- Time zone: UTC+01:00 (CET)
  - Summer (DST): UTC+02:00 (CEST)
- Postal code: 49490
- ^{1} French Land Register data, which excludes lakes, ponds, glaciers > 1 km^{2} (0.386 sq mi or 247 acres) and river estuaries.

Linières-Bouton (French pronunciation: [linjɛʁ butɔ̃]) is a former commune in the Maine-et-Loire department in western France. On 15 December 2016, it was merged into the new commune Noyant-Villages.

== See also ==
- Communes of the Maine-et-Loire department
