= Gée =

- Part of Beaufort-en-Anjou
- Location of Gée
- Location within France Location within Pays de la Loire
- Coordinates: 47°27′27″N 0°13′48″W
- Country: France
- Region: Pays de la Loire
- Department: Maine-et-Loire
- Arrondissement: Angers
- Canton: Beaufort-en-Vallée
- Commune: Beaufort-en-Anjou
- Area^{1}: 6.38 km^{2} (2.46 sq mi)
- Highest elevation: 33 m (108 ft)
- Lowest elevation: 19 m (62 ft)
- Population (2022): 446
  - Density: 69.9/km^{2} (181/sq mi)
- Demonym(s): Géen, Géenne
- Time zone: UTC+01:00 (CET)
  - Summer (DST): UTC+02:00 (CEST)
- Postal code: 49250
- ^{1} French Land Register data, which excludes lakes, ponds, glaciers > 1 km^{2} (0.386 sq mi or 247 acres) and river estuaries.

Gée (French pronunciation: [ʒe]) is a former commune in the Maine-et-Loire department in western France. On 1 January 2016, it was merged into the new commune of Beaufort-en-Anjou.

== See also ==
- Communes of the Maine-et-Loire department
