= La Pellerine =

La Pellerine may refer to the following places in France:

- La Pellerine, Maine-et-Loire, a commune in the Maine-et-Loire department
- La Pellerine, Mayenne, a commune in the Mayenne department
