= Saint-Georges-du-Bois, Maine-et-Loire =

Saint-Georges-du-Bois
- Part of Les Bois-d'Anjou
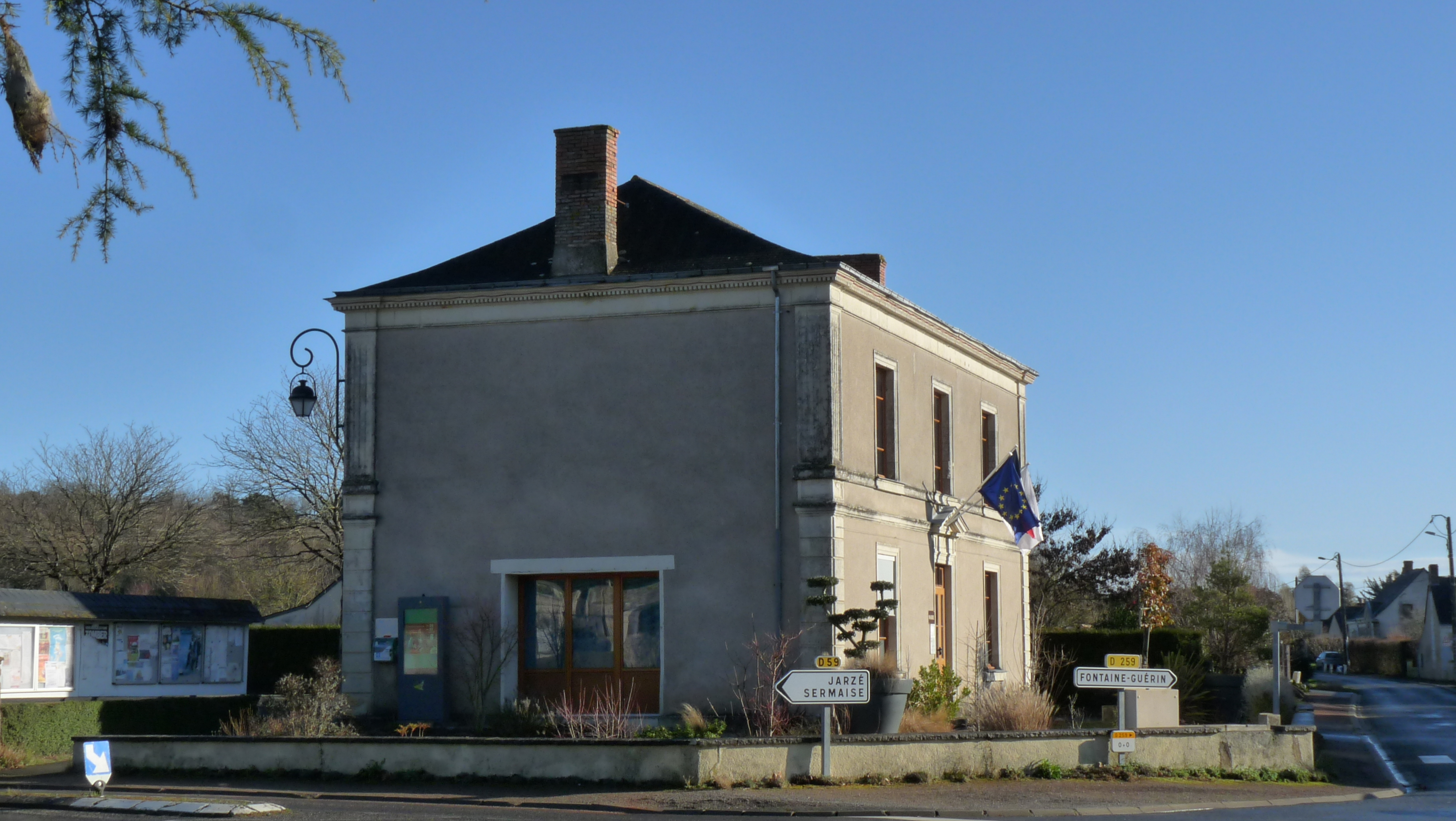
- Saint-Georges-du-Bois Town hall
- Location of Saint-Georges-du-Bois
- Location within France Location within Pays de la Loire
- Coordinates: 47°29′47″N 0°13′23″W
- Country: France
- Region: Pays de la Loire
- Department: Maine-et-Loire
- Arrondissement: Saumur
- Canton: Beaufort-en-Vallée
- Commune: Les Bois-d'Anjou
- Area^{1}: 9.42 km^{2} (3.64 sq mi)
- Highest elevation: 82 m (269 ft)
- Lowest elevation: 26 m (85 ft)
- Population (2022): 445
  - Density: 47.2/km^{2} (122/sq mi)
- Time zone: UTC+01:00 (CET)
  - Summer (DST): UTC+02:00 (CEST)
- Postal code: 49250
- ^{1} French Land Register data, which excludes lakes, ponds, glaciers > 1 km^{2} (0.386 sq mi or 247 acres) and river estuaries.

Saint-Georges-du-Bois (French pronunciation: [sɛ̃ ʒɔʁʒ dy bwa]) is a former commune in the Maine-et-Loire department in western France. On 1 January 2016, it was merged into the new commune of Les Bois-d'Anjou. Its population was 445 in 2022.

== See also ==
- Communes of the Maine-et-Loire department
