= Beaufort-en-Anjou =

- Commune
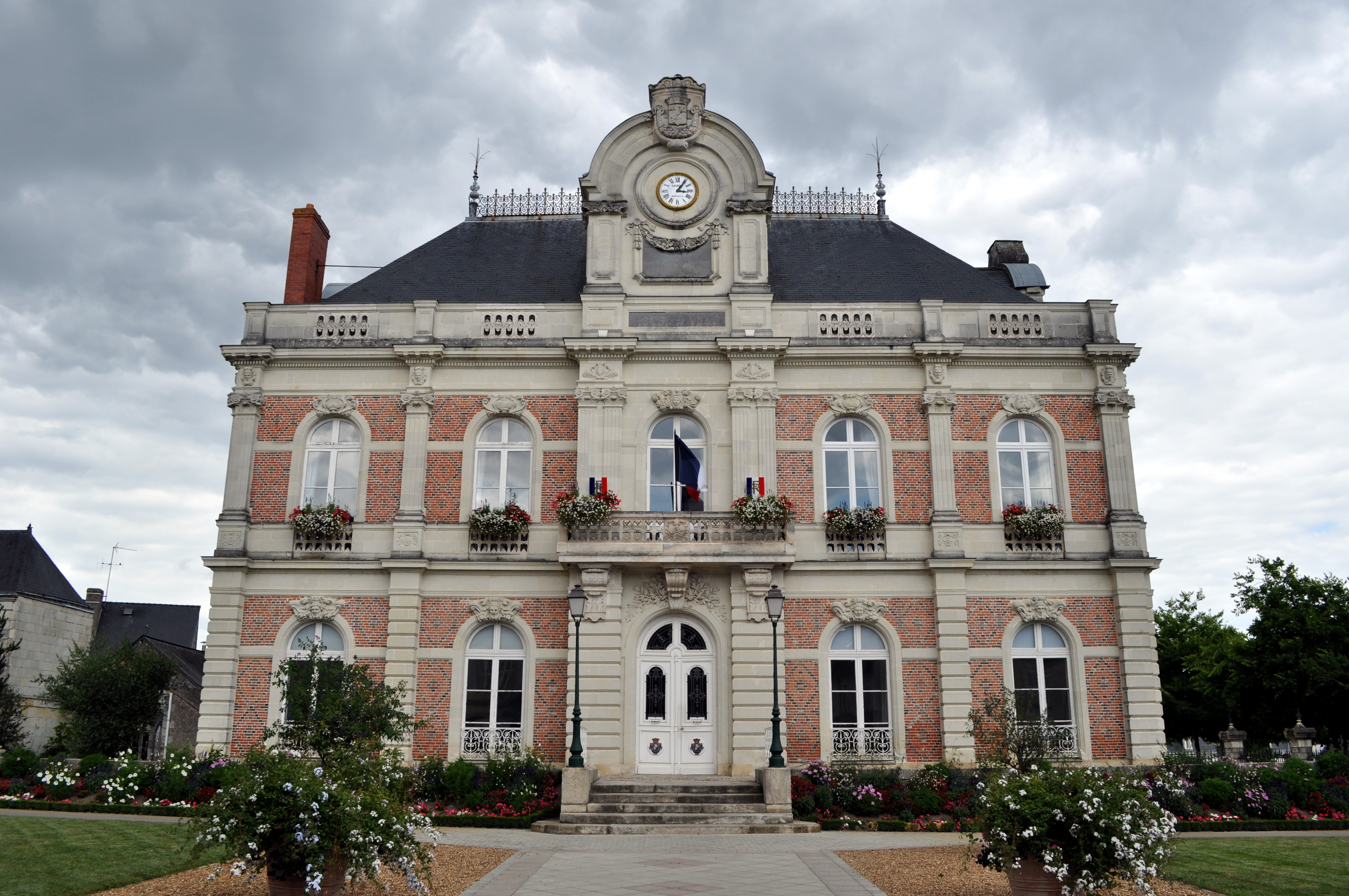
- The town hall in Beaufort
- Location of Beaufort-en-Anjou
- Location within France Location within Pays de la Loire
- Coordinates: 47°26′24″N 0°12′54″W
- Country: France
- Region: Pays de la Loire
- Department: Maine-et-Loire
- Arrondissement: Saumur
- Canton: Beaufort-en-Anjou

Government
  - Mayor (2023–2026): Alain Dozias
- Area^{1}: 42.04 km^{2} (16.23 sq mi)
- Population (2023): 6,901
  - Density: 164.2/km^{2} (425.2/sq mi)
- Time zone: UTC+01:00 (CET)
  - Summer (DST): UTC+02:00 (CEST)
- INSEE/Postal code: 49021 /49250
- ^{1} French Land Register data, which excludes lakes, ponds, glaciers > 1 km^{2} (0.386 sq mi or 247 acres) and river estuaries.

Beaufort-en-Anjou (French pronunciation: [bofɔʁ ɑ̃.n‿ɑ̃ʒu], literally Beaufort in Anjou) is a commune in the Maine-et-Loire department of western France. The municipality was established on 1 January 2016 and consists of the former communes of Beaufort-en-Vallée and Gée.

== Population ==
Population data refer to the area corresponding with the commune as of January 2025.

Historical population
Year	Pop.	±% p.a.
1968	3,818	—
1975	4,244	+1.52%
1982	4,964	+2.26%
1990	5,643	+1.62%
1999	5,677	+0.07%
2007	6,280	+1.27%
2012	6,939	+2.02%
2017	7,226	+0.81%
2023	6,901	−0.76%
Source: INSEE

== See also ==
- Communes of the Maine-et-Loire department
