= Chalonnes-sous-le-Lude =

- Part of Noyant-Villages
- Location of Chalonnes-sous-le-Lude
- Location within France Location within Pays de la Loire
- Coordinates: 47°33′35″N 0°10′25″E
- Country: France
- Region: Pays de la Loire
- Department: Maine-et-Loire
- Arrondissement: Saumur
- Canton: Beaufort-en-Vallée
- Commune: Noyant-Villages
- Area^{1}: 16.49 km^{2} (6.37 sq mi)
- Elevation: 75 m (246 ft)
- Highest elevation: 101 m (331 ft)
- Lowest elevation: 52 m (171 ft)
- Population (2022): 129
  - Density: 7.82/km^{2} (20.3/sq mi)
- Demonym(s): Chalonnais, Chalonnaise
- Time zone: UTC+01:00 (CET)
  - Summer (DST): UTC+02:00 (CEST)
- Postal code: 49490
- ^{1} French Land Register data, which excludes lakes, ponds, glaciers > 1 km^{2} (0.386 sq mi or 247 acres) and river estuaries.

Chalonnes-sous-le-Lude (French pronunciation: [ʃalɔn su lə lyd], literally Chalonnes under Le Lude) is a former commune in the Maine-et-Loire department in western France. On 15 December 2016, it was merged into the new commune Noyant-Villages.

== See also ==
- Communes of the Maine-et-Loire department
