= Les Bois-d'Anjou =

- Commune
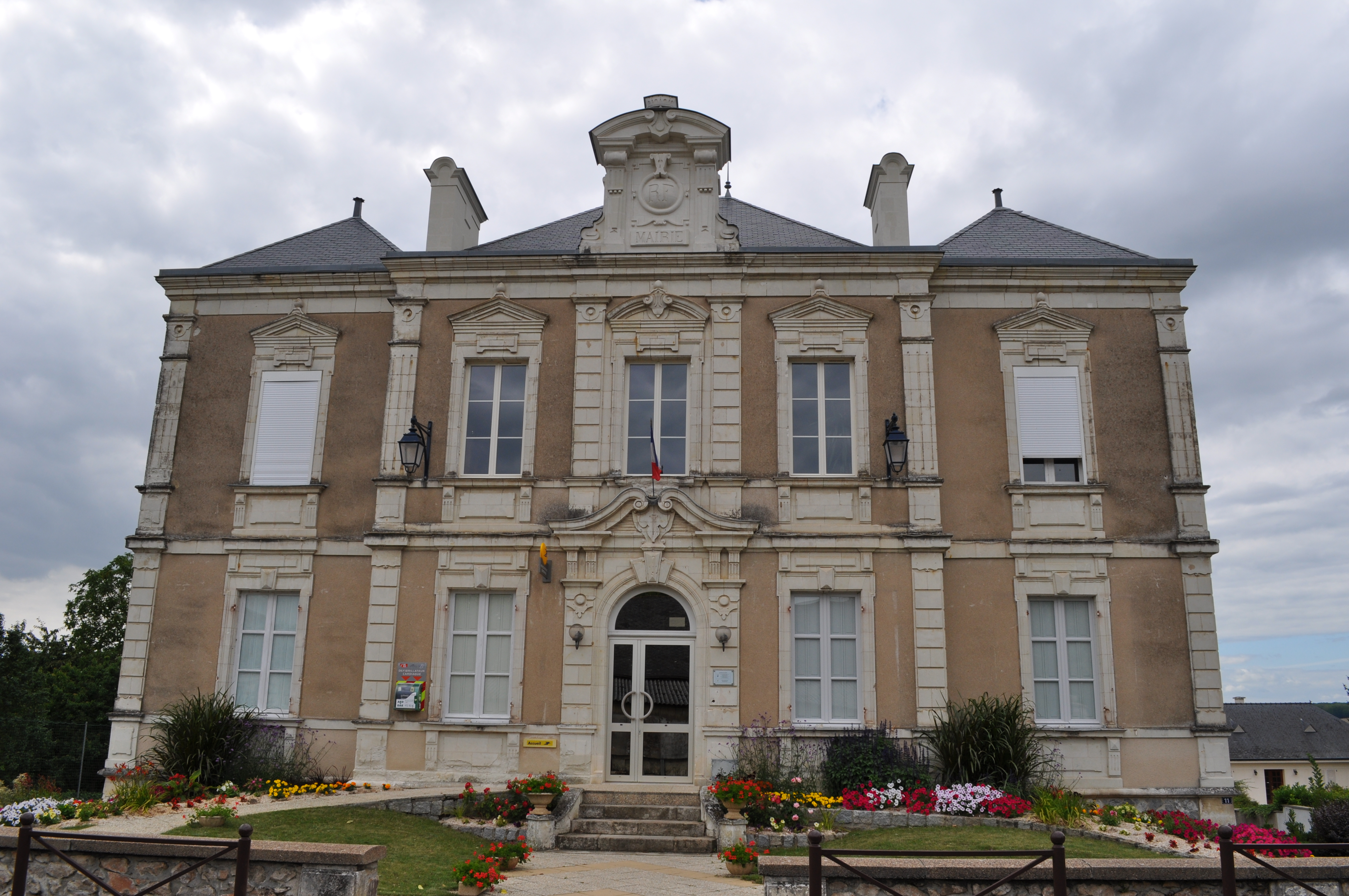
- The town hall of Fontaine-Guérin
- Location of Les Bois-d'Anjou
- Location within France Location within Pays de la Loire
- Coordinates: 47°29′13″N 0°11′20″W
- Country: France
- Region: Pays de la Loire
- Department: Maine-et-Loire
- Arrondissement: Saumur
- Canton: Beaufort-en-Anjou
- Area^{1}: 60.22 km^{2} (23.25 sq mi)
- Population (2023): 2,525
  - Density: 41.93/km^{2} (108.6/sq mi)
- Time zone: UTC+01:00 (CET)
  - Summer (DST): UTC+02:00 (CEST)
- INSEE/Postal code: 49138 /49250
- ^{1} French Land Register data, which excludes lakes, ponds, glaciers > 1 km^{2} (0.386 sq mi or 247 acres) and river estuaries.

Les Bois-d'Anjou (French pronunciation: [le bwa dɑ̃ʒu], literally The Woods of Anjou) is a commune in the Maine-et-Loire department of western France. The municipality was established on 1 January 2016 and consists of the former communes of Fontaine-Guérin, Brion and Saint-Georges-du-Bois.

== Population ==
Population data refer to the area corresponding with the commune as of January 2025.

Historical population
Year	Pop.	±% p.a.
1968	2,077	—
1975	1,866	−1.52%
1982	1,758	−0.85%
1990	1,864	+0.73%
1999	2,088	+1.27%
2007	2,368	+1.59%
2012	2,564	+1.60%
2017	2,653	+0.68%
2023	2,525	−0.82%
Source: INSEE

== See also ==
- Communes of the Maine-et-Loire department
