= Mazé-Milon =

- Commune
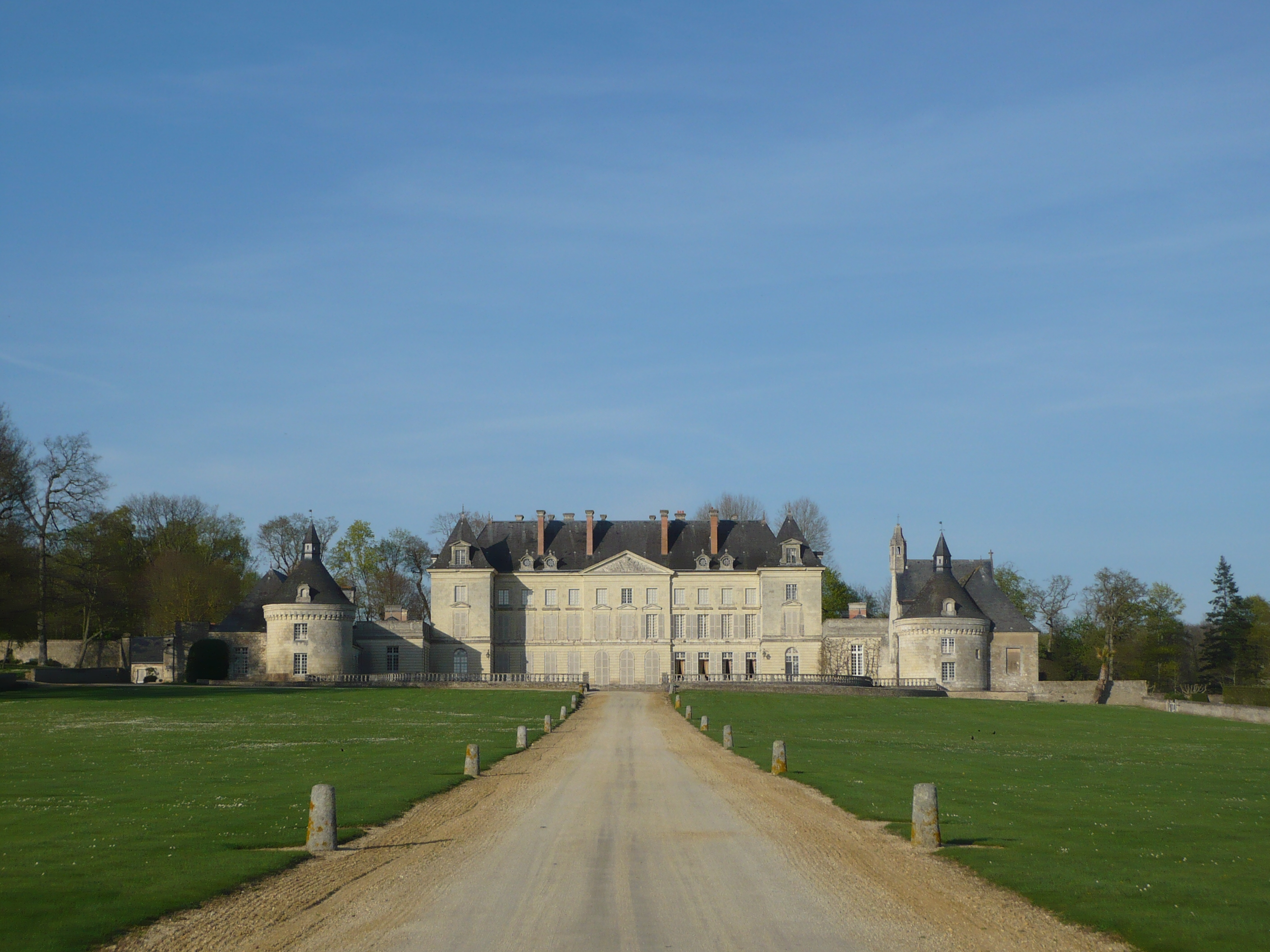
- The Château de Montgeoffroy in Mazé
- Location of Mazé-Milon
- Location within France Location within Pays de la Loire
- Coordinates: 47°27′22″N 0°16′19″W
- Country: France
- Region: Pays de la Loire
- Department: Maine-et-Loire
- Arrondissement: Saumur
- Canton: Beaufort-en-Anjou

Government
  - Mayor (2020–2026): Christophe Pot
- Area^{1}: 41.79 km^{2} (16.14 sq mi)
- Population (2023): 5,761
  - Density: 137.9/km^{2} (357.0/sq mi)
- Time zone: UTC+01:00 (CET)
  - Summer (DST): UTC+02:00 (CEST)
- INSEE/Postal code: 49194 /49630
- ^{1} French Land Register data, which excludes lakes, ponds, glaciers > 1 km^{2} (0.386 sq mi or 247 acres) and river estuaries.

Mazé-Milon (French pronunciation: [maze milɔ̃]) is a commune in the Maine-et-Loire department of western France. The municipality was established on 1 January 2016 and consists of the former communes of Mazé and Fontaine-Milon.

== Population ==
The population data given in the table below refer to the commune in its geography as of January 2025.

Historical population
Year	Pop.	±% p.a.
1968	2,814	—
1975	2,838	+0.12%
1982	3,489	+2.99%
1990	4,034	+1.83%
1999	4,229	+0.53%
2007	4,962	+2.02%
2012	5,516	+2.14%
2017	5,799	+1.01%
2023	5,761	−0.11%
Source: INSEE

== See also ==
- Communes of the Maine-et-Loire department
