= Noyant-Villages =

- Commune
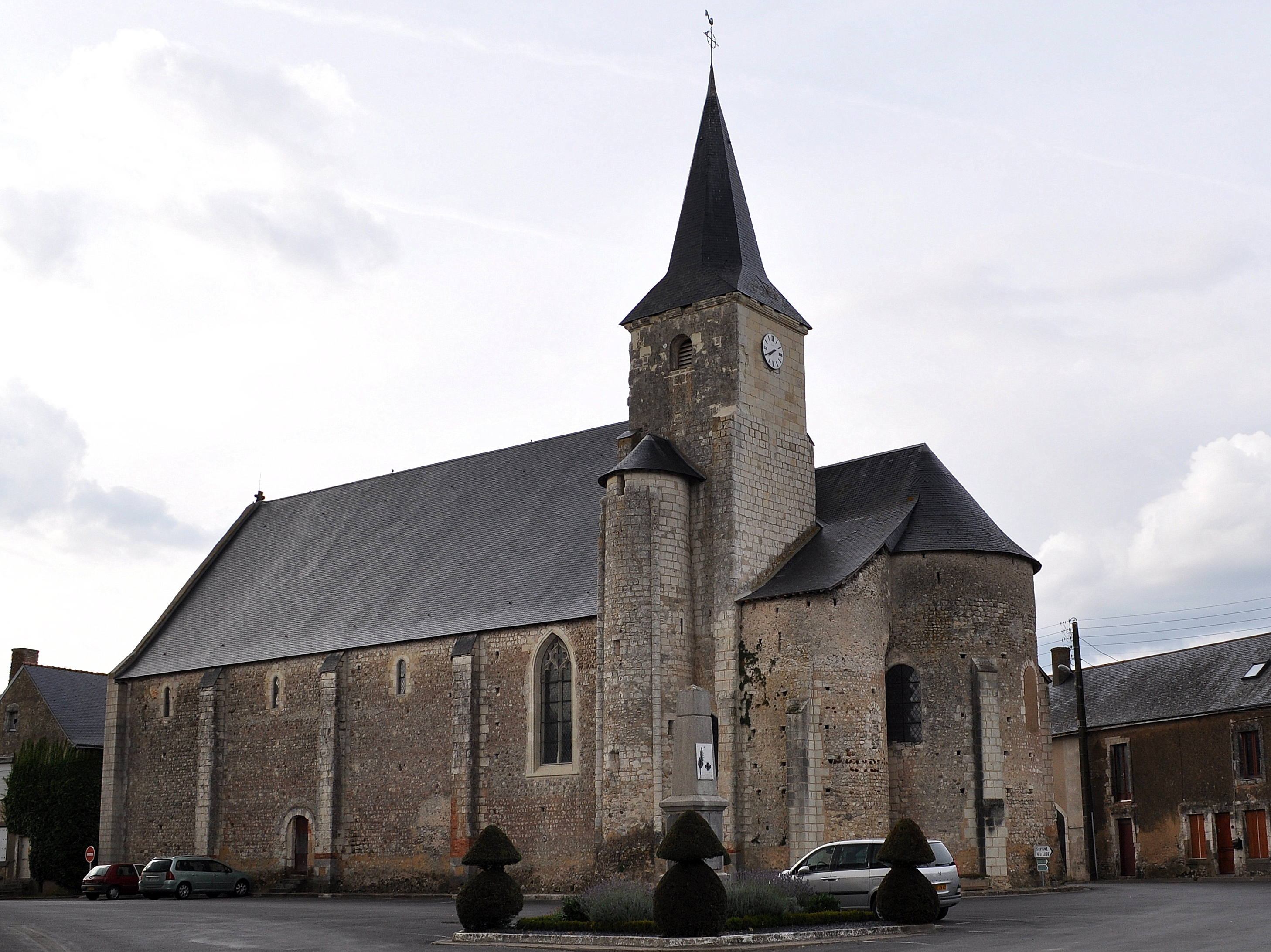
- The church of Saint-Martin in Genneteil
- Location of Noyant-Villages
- Location within France Location within Pays de la Loire
- Coordinates: 47°30′47″N 0°06′58″E
- Country: France
- Region: Pays de la Loire
- Department: Maine-et-Loire
- Arrondissement: Saumur
- Canton: Beaufort-en-Anjou
- Intercommunality: CC Baugeois Vallée

Government
  - Mayor (2020–2026): Adrien Denis
- Area^{1}: 299.45 km^{2} (115.62 sq mi)
- Population (2023): 5,448
  - Density: 18.19/km^{2} (47.12/sq mi)
- Time zone: UTC+01:00 (CET)
  - Summer (DST): UTC+02:00 (CEST)
- INSEE/Postal code: 49228 /49390, 49490
- ^{1} French Land Register data, which excludes lakes, ponds, glaciers > 1 km^{2} (0.386 sq mi or 247 acres) and river estuaries.

Noyant-Villages (French pronunciation: [nwajɑ̃ vilaʒ]) is a commune in the Maine-et-Loire department of western France. The municipality was established on 15 December 2016 and consists of the former communes of Auverse, Breil, Broc, Chalonnes-sous-le-Lude, Chavaignes, Chigné, Dénezé-sous-le-Lude, Genneteil, Lasse, Linières-Bouton, Meigné-le-Vicomte, Méon, Noyant and Parçay-les-Pins.

== Population ==
The population data given in the table below refer to the commune in its geography as of January 2025.

Historical population
| Year | Pop. | ±% p.a. |
|---|---|---|
| 1968 | 7,256 | — |
| 1975 | 6,485 | −1.59% |
| 1982 | 6,130 | −0.80% |
| 1990 | 5,669 | −0.97% |
| 1999 | 5,853 | +0.36% |
| 2007 | 5,943 | +0.19% |
| 2012 | 6,009 | +0.22% |
| 2017 | 5,633 | −1.28% |
| 2023 | 5,448 | −0.56% |
Source: INSEE

== See also ==
- Communes of the Maine-et-Loire department
