= Noyant =

Commune in Maine-et-Loire, France

- Part of Noyant-Villages
- Coat of arms
- Location of Noyant
- Location within France Location within Pays de la Loire
- Coordinates: 47°30′46″N 0°06′59″E
- Country: France
- Region: Pays de la Loire
- Department: Maine-et-Loire
- Arrondissement: Saumur
- Canton: Beaufort-en-Vallée
- Commune: Noyant-Villages
- Area^{1}: 27.41 km^{2} (10.58 sq mi)
- Elevation: 80 m (260 ft)
- Highest elevation: 89 m (292 ft)
- Lowest elevation: 51 m (167 ft)
- Population (2022): 1,746
  - Density: 63.70/km^{2} (165.0/sq mi)
- Demonym(s): Noyantais, Noyantaise
- Time zone: UTC+01:00 (CET)
  - Summer (DST): UTC+02:00 (CEST)
- Postal code: 49490
- Website: Site de la commune de Noyant
- ^{1} French Land Register data, which excludes lakes, ponds, glaciers > 1 km^{2} (0.386 sq mi or 247 acres) and river estuaries.

Noyant (French pronunciation: [nwajɑ̃]) is a former commune in the Maine-et-Loire department in western France. On 15 December 2016, it was merged into the new commune Noyant-Villages. The archivist and historian François Jourda de Vaux de Foletier (1893–1988) was born in Noyant

== See also ==
- Communes of the Maine-et-Loire department
