= Kurt Lasse =

German fighter ace and Knight's Cross recipient (1918–1941)

- Lasse as an Oberleutnant
- Born: 17 February 1918; Rawitsch
- Died: 8 October 1941 (aged 23) over the Isthmus of Perekop
- Military career
- Allegiance: Nazi Germany
- Branch: Luftwaffe
- Service years: ?–1941
- Rank: Oberleutnant (first lieutenant)
- Unit: JG 77
- Conflicts: World War II: Invasion of Norway; Battle of France; Balkans Campaign; Operation Barbarossa; Crimean Campaign
- Awards: Knight's Cross of the Iron Cross

Kurt Lasse (17 February 1918 – 8 October 1941) was a German Luftwaffe ace and a posthumous recipient of the Knight's Cross of the Iron Cross during World War II. On 8 October 1941, Lasse was killed in action in a mid-air collision with his wingman over Isthmus of Perekop. During his career he was credited with 39 aerial victories, 1 on the Western Front and 38 on the Eastern Front.

== Career ==
Lasse was born on 17 February 1918 in Rawitsch in the Province of Posen within the German Empire, present-day Rawicz, Poland.

On 25 March 1940, Lasse was posted to II. Gruppe (2nd group) of Jagdggruppe 186 (II./186—186th Fighter Group). This group, also known as the Trägerjagdgruppe (Carrier Fighter Group), was destined to be stationed on the aircraft carrier Graf Zeppelin which was never completed. II./186 (T) initially consisted of two squadrons, 4./186 (T) equipped with the Junkers Ju 87 dive bomber, (Note: The suffix 'T' denotes Träger (carrier) in German use.) and 6./186 (T).

== World War II ==
World War II in Europe had begun on Friday, 1 September 1939, when German forces invaded Poland. Following the decision by Adolf Hitler to halt work on the aircraft carrier Graf Zeppelin, II./186 (T) was redesignated and became the III. Gruppe of Jagdgeschwader 77 (JG 77—77th Fighter Wing). In consequence, Lasse's Staffel 6./186 (T) became the 9. Staffel of JG 77 which was headed by Oberleutnant Lorenz Weber. A week later, III. Gruppe was withdrawn from this theater of operations and relocated to Döberitz where it was tasked with fighter protection of Berlin. In November, JG 77 was ordered to the English Channel to continue fighting the Royal Air Force (RAF) in the aftermath of the Battle of Britain. 8. Staffel moved to an airfield at Cherbourg-en-Cotentin on 30 November.

In preparation for Operation Marita, the German invasion of Greece, III. Gruppe of JG 77 was moved to Deta in western Romania on 4 April 1941. On 16 April, III. Gruppe had relocated to an airfield at Korinos. Two days later, Lasser claimed his first aerial victory when elements of 9. Staffel intercepted a formation of Bristol Blenheim bombers from the Royal Air Force No. 11 Squadron. Two Blenheim bombers were claimed shot down, including one by Lasse. On 19 April, the Gruppe reached Larissa. That day, Lasse was appointed Staffelkapitän (squadron leader) of 9. Staffel of JG 77. He replace Oberleutnant Armin Schmidt was killed in action.

=== Eastern Front ===
In preparation for Operation Barbarossa, the German invasion of the Soviet Union, III. Gruppe was moved to Bucharest and was located in the sector of Heeresgruppe Süd (Army Group South). III. Gruppe arrived in Bucharest on 16 June. Four days later, III. Gruppe moved to Roman. That evening, the pilots and ground crews were briefed of the upcoming invasion of the Soviet Union, which opened the Eastern Front. On 2 July in support of the German and Romanian Operation München, III. Gruppe moved to an airfield at Iași.

Engaged in aerial combat with Mikoyan-Gurevich MiG-3 fighters, Lasse was killed in a mid-air collision with his wingman, Feldwebel Robert Helmer, on 8 October 1941. While Helmer nursed his damaged aircraft back, Lasse's Bf 109 F-4 (Werknummer 8475—factory number) crashed near Armiansk. Command of 9. Staffel was then passed on to Hauptmann Arthur Brutzer. Posthumously, Lasse was awarded the Knight's Cross of the Iron Cross (Ritterkreuz des Eisernen Kreuzes) on 3 May 1942.

== Summary of career ==
=== Aerial victory claims ===
Mathews and Foreman, authors of Luftwaffe Aces — Biographies and Victory Claims, researched the German Federal Archives and found records for 39 aerial victory claims, claimed in over 300 combat missions. This figure includes one aerial victory over the Western Allies and 38 on the Eastern Front.

Victory claims were logged to a map-reference (PQ = Planquadrat), for example "PQ 3742". The Luftwaffe grid map (Jägermeldenetz) covered all of Europe, western Russia and North Africa and was composed of rectangles measuring 15 minutes of latitude by 30 minutes of longitude, an area of about 360 square miles (930 km^{2}). These sectors were then subdivided into 36 smaller units to give a location area 3 km × 4 km (1.9 mi × 2.5 mi) in size.

Chronicle of aerial victories
This and the ? (question mark) indicates information discrepancies listed by Prien, Stemmer, Rodeike, Bock, Mathews and Foreman.
Claim	Date	Time	Type	Location	Claim	Date	Time	Type	Location
– 9. Staffel of Jagdgeschwader 77 – Balkans and Crete — 1 April – 1 June 1941
1	18 April 1941	12:33	Blenheim						
– 9. Staffel of Jagdgeschwader 77 – Operation Barbarossa — 22 June – 8 October 1941
? (Note: This claim is not listed by Prien, Stemmer, Rodeike and Bock.)	22 June 1941	19:46	I-153		21	6 September 1941	09:12	I-16	
2	23 June 1941	15:33	I-153		22	6 September 1941	13:25	I-16	
3	23 June 1941	15:48	ZKB-19? (Note: According to Mathews and Foreman claimed as an Ilyushin DB-3.)		23	7 September 1941	13:50	DB-3	
4	23 June 1941	15:57? (Note: According to Mathews and Foreman claimed at 18:57 as an Ilyushin DB-3.)	ZKB-19?		24	7 September 1941	13:53	DB-3	
5? (Note: This claim is not listed by Mathews and Foreman.)	23 June 1941	18:45	SB-2		25	7 September 1941	13:55	DB-3	
6	2 July 1941	17:38	DB-3		26	16 September 1941	07:42	MiG-3	
7	5 July 1941	16:48	ZKB-19?		27	16 September 1941	10:35	DB-3	
8	8 July 1941	18:22	MiG-3		28	16 September 1941	10:39	DB-3	
9	8 July 1941	18:27? (Note: According to Mathews and Foreman claimed at 18:24.)	MiG-3		29	18 September 1941	17:15	DB-3	
10	10 July 1941	17:46	I-16		30	19 September 1941	13:17	unknown	
11	11 July 1941	16:36	I-16		31	20 September 1941	07:30	MiG-3	
12	4 August 1941	16:37	R-10 (Seversky)		32	21 September 1941	10:46	I-153	
13	17 August 1941	18:56	I-16		33	21 September 1941	10:52	I-16	
14	22 August 1941	11:05	I-15		34	25 September 1941	13:05	I-16	
15	22 August 1941	14:18	I-15		35	28 September 1941	12:25	Il-2	
16	27 August 1941	10:45	MiG-3		36	29 September 1941	14:45	Il-2	
17	27 August 1941	10:47	MiG-3		37	30 September 1941	14:47	MiG-3	
18	27 August 1941	10:52	MiG-3		38	1 October 1941	16:46	I-16	
19	31 August 1941	16:32	SB-2		39	2 October 1941	11:56	I-16	
20	31 August 1941	17:02	SB-3	PQ 3742					

=== Awards ===
- Iron Cross (1939) 2nd and 1st Class
- Knight's Cross of the Iron Cross on 3 May 1942 as Oberleutnant and Staffelkapitän of the 9./Jagdgeschwader 77
