= La Pellerine, Maine-et-Loire =

La Pellerine
- Commune
- Location of La Pellerine
- Location within France Location within Pays de la Loire
- Coordinates: 47°27′42″N 0°07′26″E
- Country: France
- Region: Pays de la Loire
- Department: Maine-et-Loire
- Arrondissement: Saumur
- Canton: Beaufort-en-Anjou
- Intercommunality: Baugeois Vallée

Government
  - Mayor (2020–2026): Christian Boitteau
- Area^{1}: 5.3 km^{2} (2.0 sq mi)
- Highest elevation: 97 m (318 ft)
- Lowest elevation: 54 m (177 ft)
- Population (2023): 141
  - Density: 27/km^{2} (69/sq mi)
- Demonym(s): Pellerinois, Pellerinoise
- Time zone: UTC+01:00 (CET)
  - Summer (DST): UTC+02:00 (CEST)
- INSEE/Postal code: 49237 /49490
- ^{1} French Land Register data, which excludes lakes, ponds, glaciers > 1 km^{2} (0.386 sq mi or 247 acres) and river estuaries.

La Pellerine (French pronunciation: [la pɛlʁin]) is a commune in the Maine-et-Loire department in western France.

== See also ==
- Communes of the Maine-et-Loire department
