= Canton of Beaufort-en-Anjou =

Administrative division of Maine-et-Loire, France

Coordinates: 47.44°N 0.22°W

The canton of Beaufort-en-Anjou (before March 2020: canton of Beaufort-en-Vallée) is an administrative division of the Maine-et-Loire department, in western France. Its borders were modified at the French canton reorganisation which came into effect in March 2015. Its seat is in Beaufort-en-Anjou.

It consists of the following communes:

1. Baugé-en-Anjou
2. Beaufort-en-Anjou
3. Les Bois-d'Anjou
4. Mazé-Milon
5. Noyant-Villages
6. La Pellerine
