= Vaulandry =

- Part of Baugé-en-Anjou
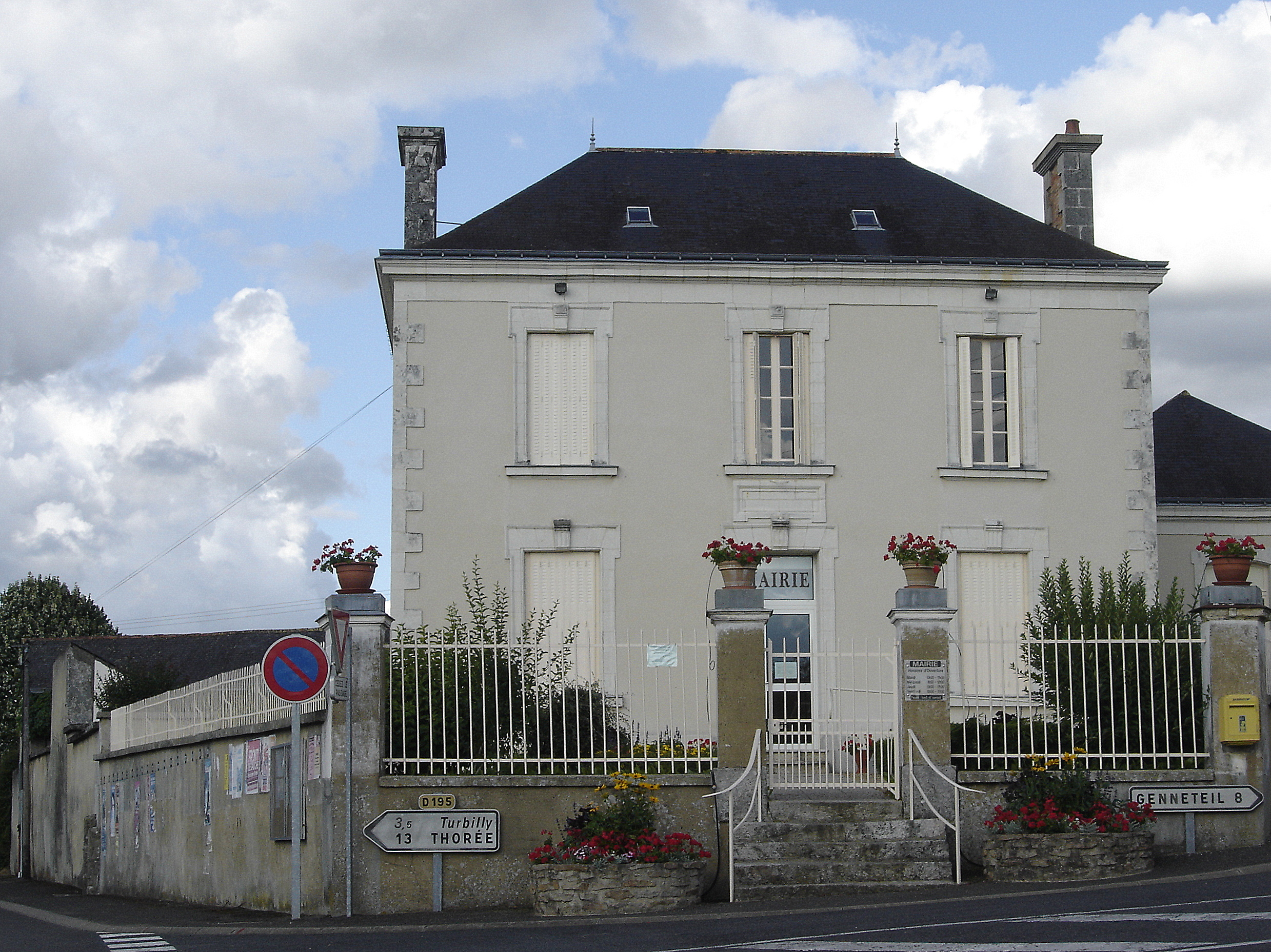
- Location of Vaulandry
- Location within France Location within Pays de la Loire
- Coordinates: 47°35′51″N 0°02′34″W
- Country: France
- Region: Pays de la Loire
- Department: Maine-et-Loire
- Arrondissement: Saumur
- Canton: Baugé
- Commune: Baugé-en-Anjou
- Area^{1}: 27.65 km^{2} (10.68 sq mi)
- Highest elevation: 87 m (285 ft)
- Lowest elevation: 46 m (151 ft)
- Population (2022): 310
  - Density: 11/km^{2} (29/sq mi)
- Demonym(s): Vallilandriais, Vallilandriaise
- Time zone: UTC+01:00 (CET)
  - Summer (DST): UTC+02:00 (CEST)
- Postal code: 49150
- ^{1} French Land Register data, which excludes lakes, ponds, glaciers > 1 km^{2} (0.386 sq mi or 247 acres) and river estuaries.

Vaulandry (French pronunciation: [volɑ̃dʁi]) is a former commune in the Maine-et-Loire department in western France. In January 2013 it merged with Clefs to form the commune of Clefs-Val d'Anjou, which merged into the commune Baugé-en-Anjou on 1 January 2016. Its population was 310 in 2022.

== See also ==
- Communes of the Maine-et-Loire department
