= Clefs, Maine-et-Loire =

Clefs
- Part of Baugé-en-Anjou
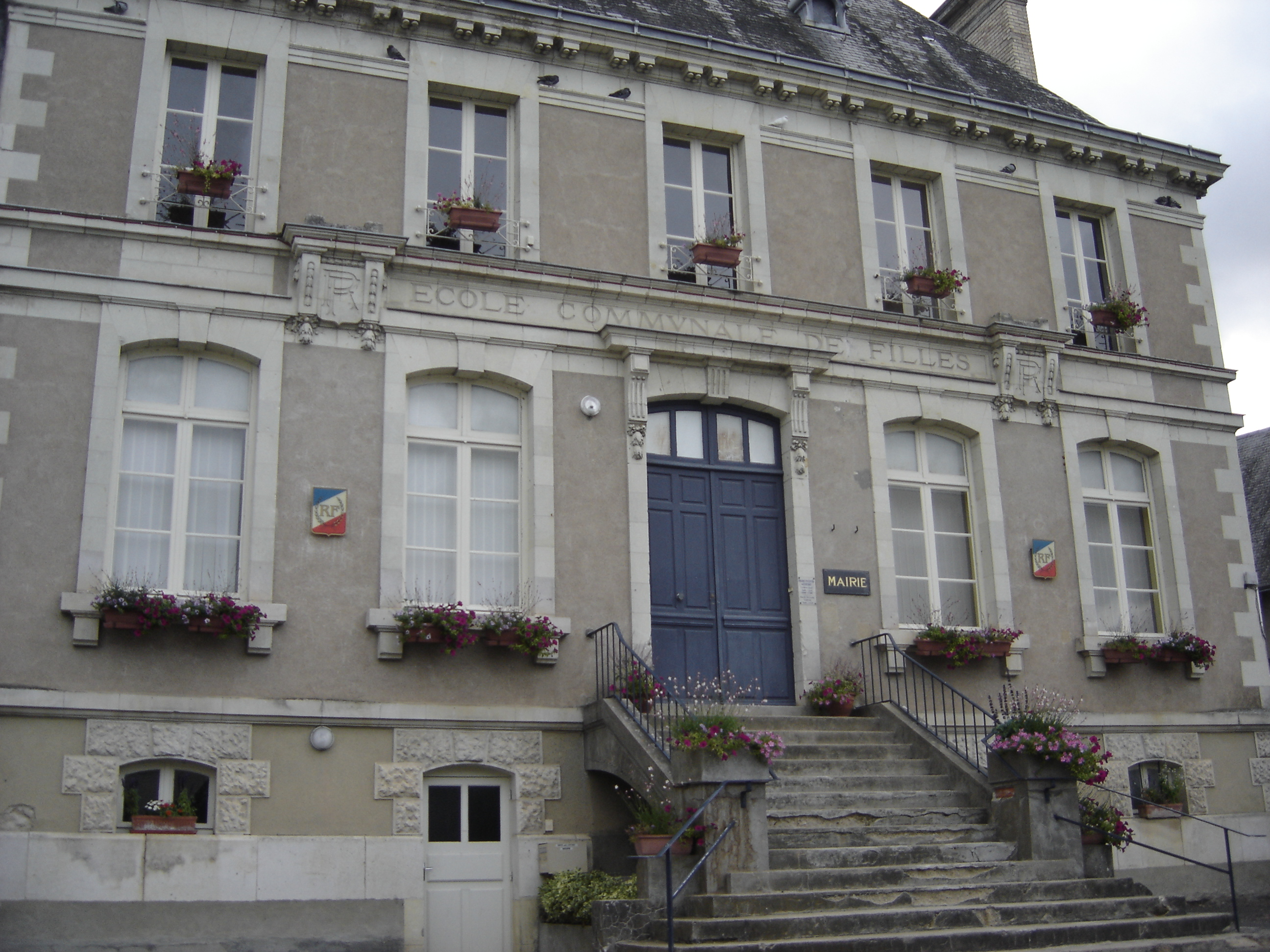
- Clefs Town hall
- Location of Clefs
- Location within France Location within Pays de la Loire
- Coordinates: 47°37′37″N 0°04′07″W
- Country: France
- Region: Pays de la Loire
- Department: Maine-et-Loire
- Arrondissement: Saumur
- Canton: Baugé
- Commune: Baugé-en-Anjou
- Area^{1}: 25.92 km^{2} (10.01 sq mi)
- Elevation: 60 m (200 ft)
- Highest elevation: 97 m (318 ft)
- Lowest elevation: 30 m (98 ft)
- Population (2022): 1,064
  - Density: 41.05/km^{2} (106.3/sq mi)
- Demonym(s): Cléfois, Cléfoise
- Time zone: UTC+01:00 (CET)
  - Summer (DST): UTC+02:00 (CEST)
- Postal code: 49150
- ^{1} French Land Register data, which excludes lakes, ponds, glaciers > 1 km^{2} (0.386 sq mi or 247 acres) and river estuaries.

Clefs (French pronunciation: [kle]) is a former commune in the Maine-et-Loire department in western France. In January 2013 it merged with Vaulandry to form the commune of Clefs-Val d'Anjou, which merged into the commune Baugé-en-Anjou on 1 January 2016. Its population was 1,064 in 2022.

== See also ==
- Communes of the Maine-et-Loire department
