= Telavi Municipality =

Coordinates: 41.9167°N 45.4833°E

Telavi Municipality თელავის მუნიციპალიტეტი
- Municipality
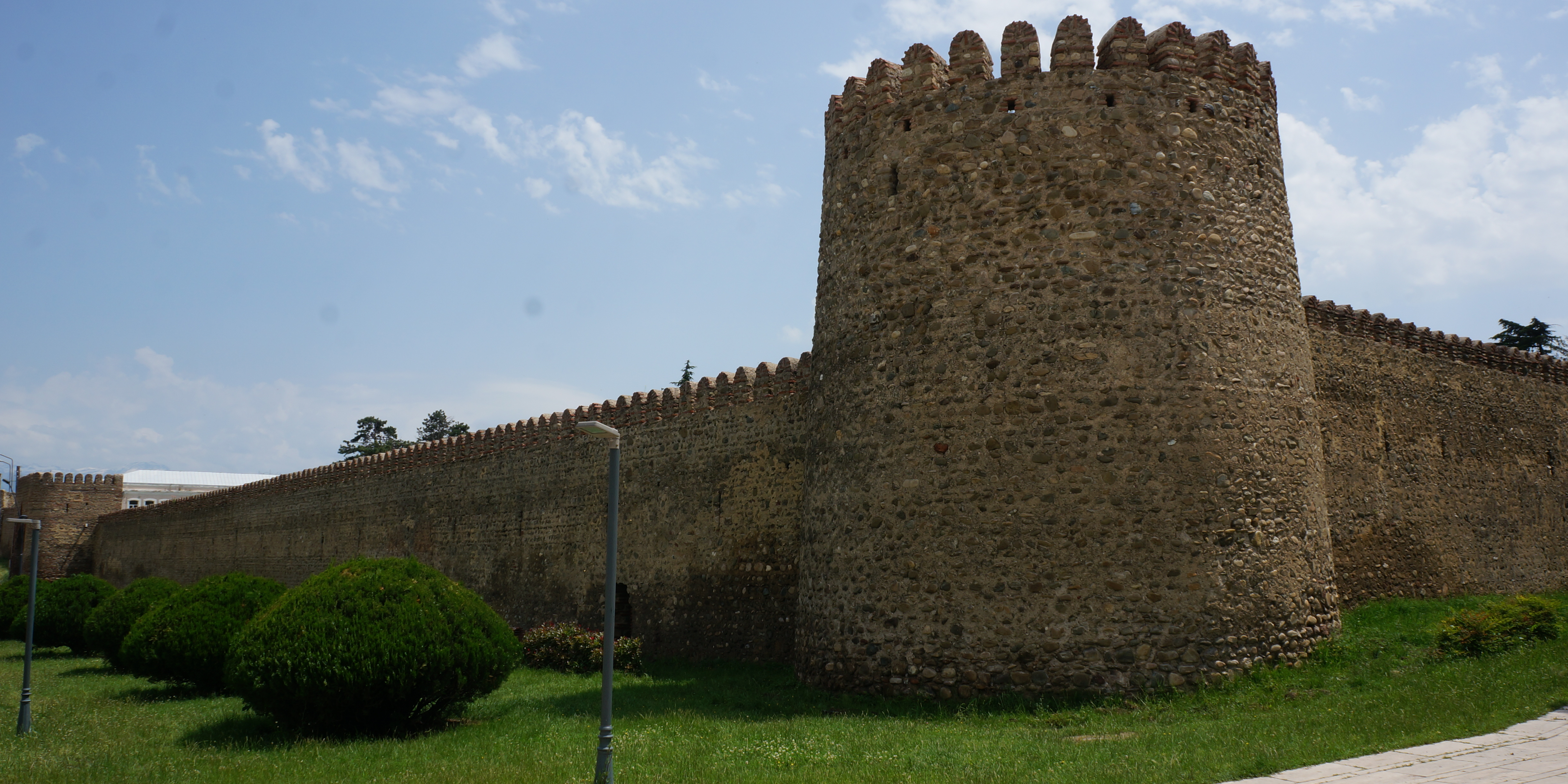
- Telavi Palace Wall

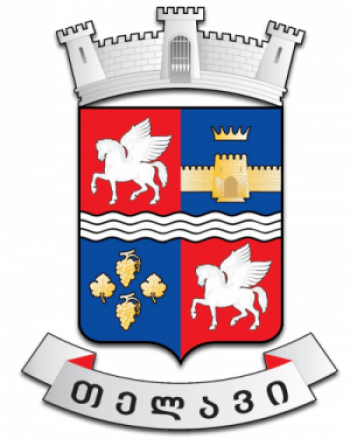
- Flag Seal

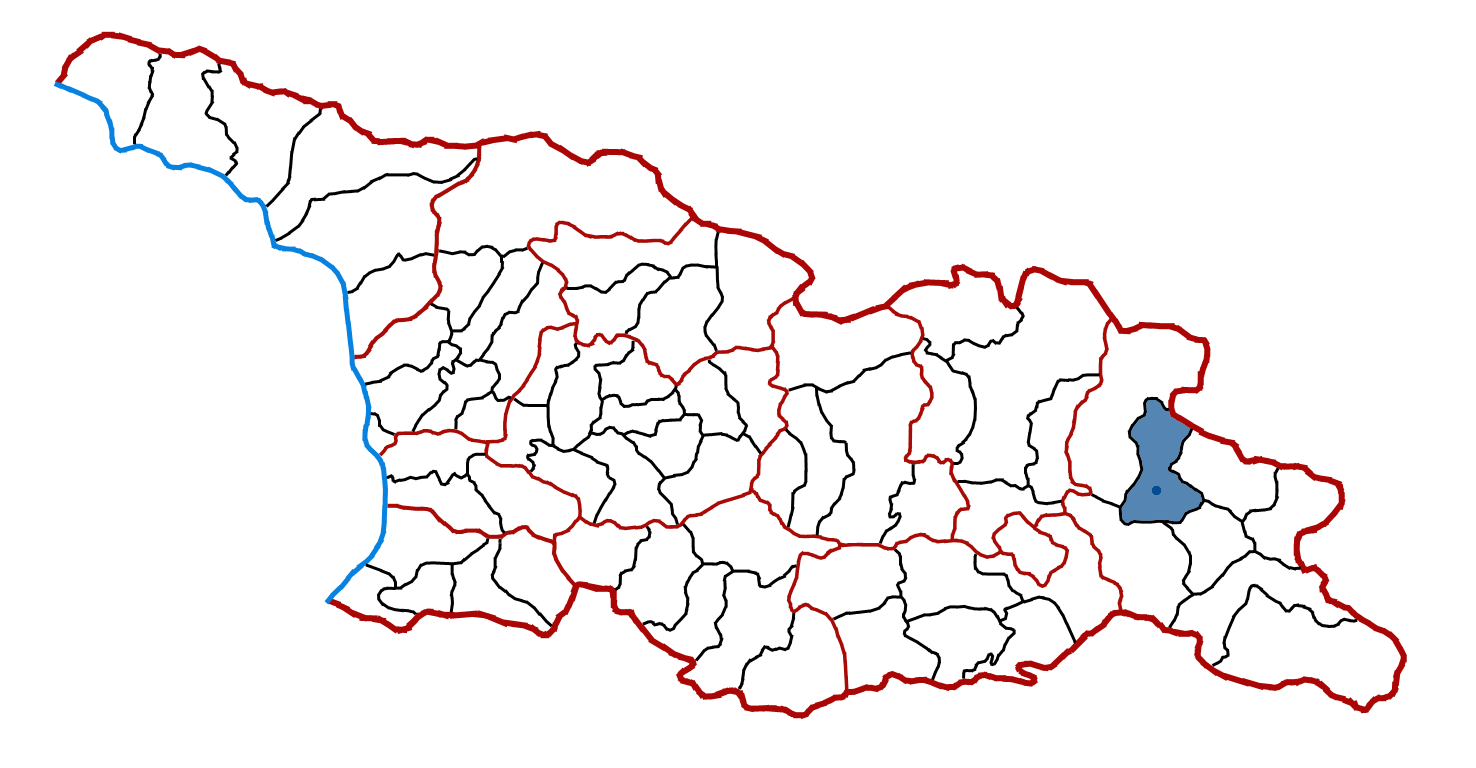
- Telavi Municipality
- Interactive map of Telavi Municipality
- Country: Georgia
- Mkhare: Kakheti
- capital city: Telavi

Government
  - mayor: Shota Nareklishvili

Area
  - Total: 1,095 km^{2} (423 sq mi)

Population (2014)
  - Total: 58,350
  - Density: 53.29/km^{2} (138.0/sq mi)

Population by ethnicity
  - Georgians: 89.72%
  - Azerbaijanis: 8.63%
  - Yazidis: 0.53%
  - Russians: 0.27%
  - Armenians: 0.25%
- Time zone: UTC+4 (Georgian Standard Time)
- Website: http://telavi.gov.ge/ge

Telavi (Georgian: თელავის მუნიციპალიტეტი) is a municipality of Georgia, in the region of Kakheti. Its administrative centre is Telavi. Telavi is an important transportation hub, industrial, agricultural (winemaking) and cultural center of Eastern Georgia.

== History ==
Until 1917, the territory of the municipality was included in the Telavi Mazra of the Tbilisi province, and from 1930 it was formed as a separate district. It has been called a municipality since 2006, and the city of Telavi has been separated from the municipality since 2014. In 2017, the city of Telavi was deprived of the status of a self-governing city, joined the self-governing community and the Telavi municipality was created.

== Administrative divisions and population ==
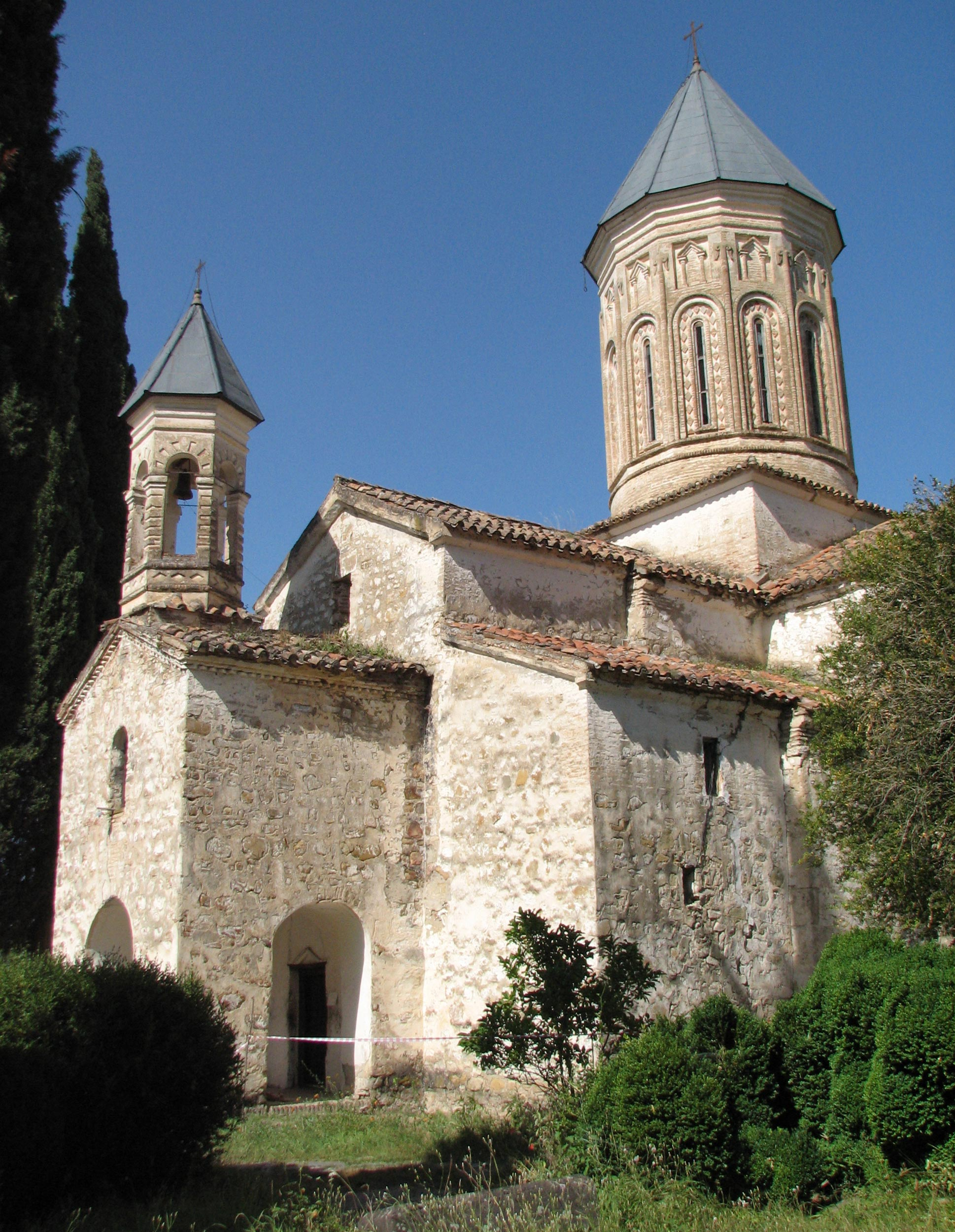
Ikalto monastery

Telavi Municipality consists of 27 administrative units and 30 settlements. According to the National Statistics Office of Georgia, the population of Telavi Municipality as of 1 January 2021, is 55.1 thousand people. 19.8 thousand people live in urban areas and 35.4 thousand people in rural areas.

1. Administrative unit of Old Telavi (part of Telavi);
2. Administrative unit of Central Telavi (part of Telavi);
3. Administrative unit of West Telavi (part of Telavi);
4. Administrative unit of Alazani-Caucasus (part of Telavi);
5. Administrative unit of East Telavi (part of Telavi);
6. Administrative unit of Akura;
7. Administrative unit of Artana;
8. Administrative unit of Busheti;
9. Administrative unit of Gulgula;
10. Administrative unit of Ikalto;
11. Administrative unit of Karajala;
12. Administrative unit of Kisiskhevi;
13. Administrative unit of Kondoli;
14. Administrative unit of Kurdghelauri;
15. Administrative unit of Kvemo Khodasheni;
16. Administrative unit of Lalisquri;
17. Administrative unit of Lapanquri;
18. Administrative unit of Napareuli;
19. Administrative unit of Nasamkhrali;
20. Administrative unit of Pshaveli (including Lechuri);
21. Administrative unit of Ruispiri (including Akhateli);
22. Administrative unit of Saniore (including Jughaani);
23. Administrative unit of Shalauri;
24. Administrative unit of Tetritsklebi (including Kobadze, Nadikvari, Serodani, Pantiani);
25. Administrative unit of Tsinandali;
26. Administrative unit of Vanta;
27. Administrative unit of Vardisubani.

=== Settlements ===
Rank	Settlement	Population
1	Telavi	19 629
2	Kurdghelauri	3 962
3	Tsinandali	2 675
4	Kondoli	2 188
5	Napareuli	2,003
6	Kisiskhevi	1,916
7	Akura	1 869
8	Pshaveli	1 624
9	Kvemo Khodasheni	1 277
10	Gulgula	1 108
11	Busheti	1 090
12	Lapanquri	620
13	Lalisquri	499
14	Akhateli	271

== Geography and climate ==
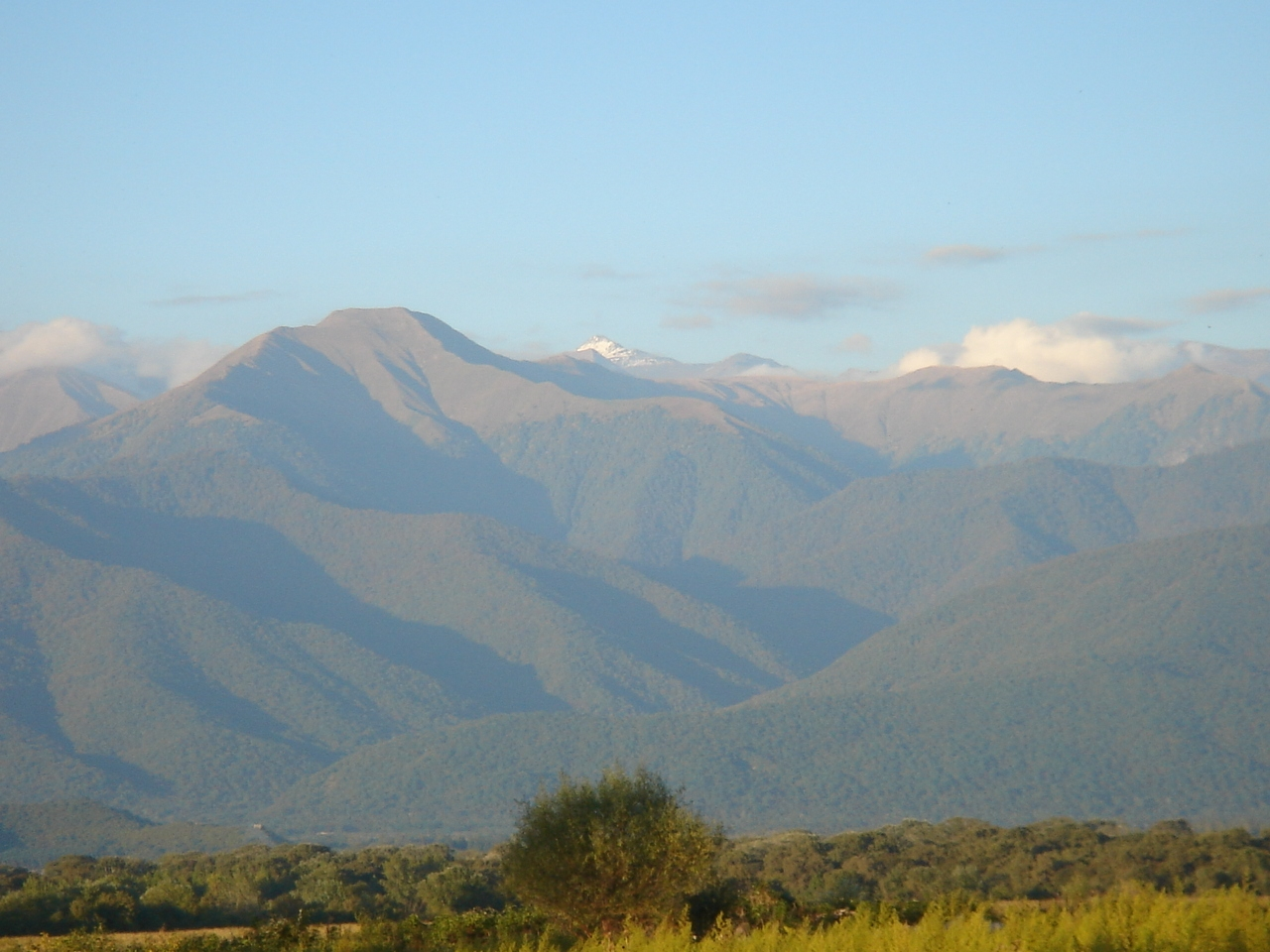
The Alazani River Plain

Telavi Municipality is bordered on the north and west by Akhmeta Municipality, on the northeast by the Republic of Dagestan, on the east by Kvareli Municipality, on the south-east by Gurjaani Municipality, and on the south-west by Sagarejo Municipality. A large part of the municipal lands is occupied by deciduous forests.

The territory of the municipality belongs to the district of moderately humid subtropical climate. The average annual air temperature is 12 °C, the amount of precipitation is 700–800 mm per year. The main hydrological artery of Telavi Municipality is formed by the Alazani River and its basin. The central part of Telavi Municipality is spread on the Alazani plain and is bordered on the south-west by the Gombori ridge, and on the northeast by the Kakheti Caucasus. The highest peak of Gombori ridge is cold (1991 m) on the territory of Telavi municipality.

== Politics ==
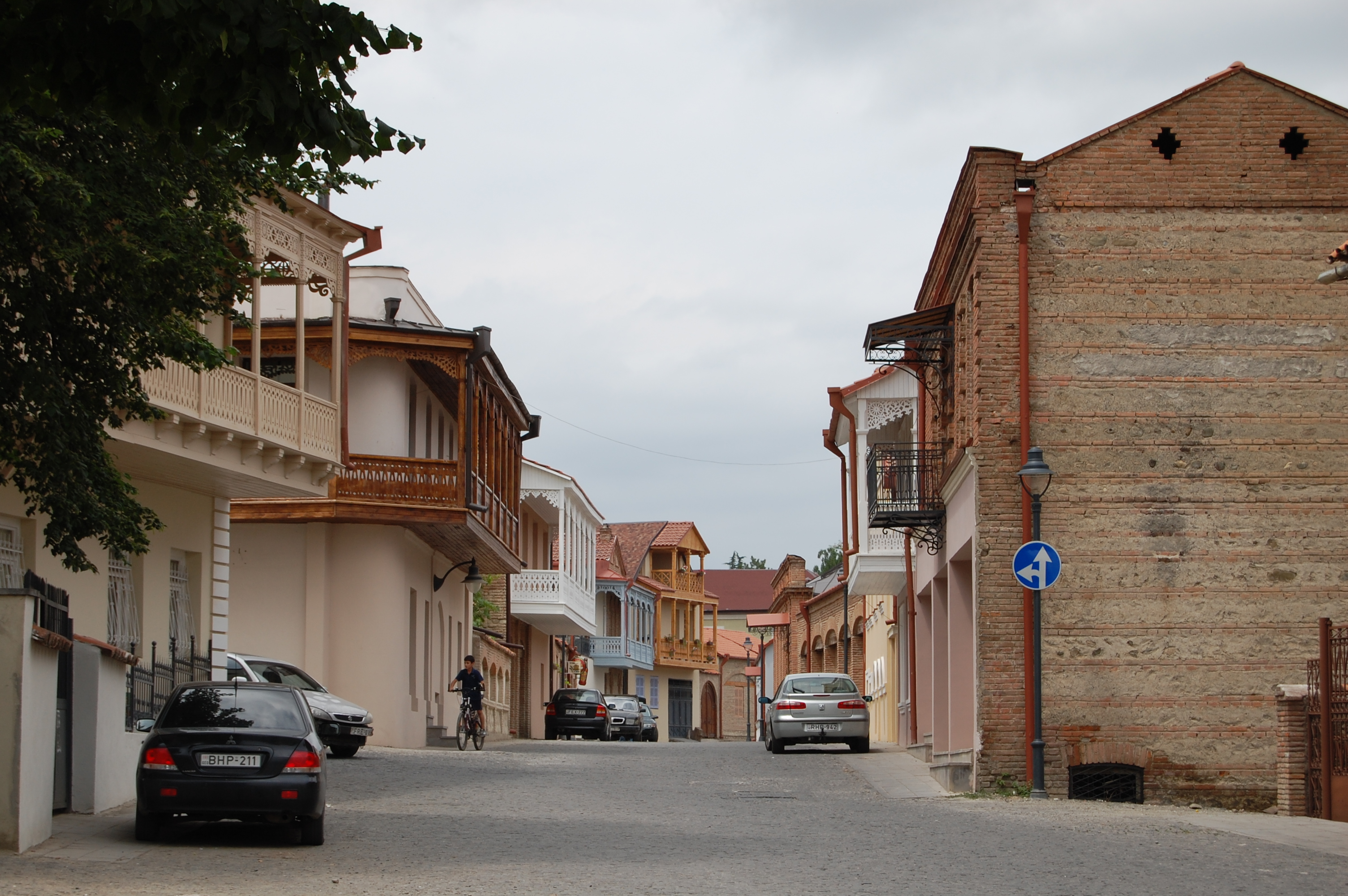
Telavi old city

Telavi Municipal Assembly (Georgian: თელავის საკრებულო) is a representative body in Telavi Municipality. currently consisting of 39 members. The council is assembled into session regularly, to consider subject matters such as code changes, utilities, taxes, city budget, oversight of city government and more. Municipal Assembly and Mayor are elected every four-year. The last election was held in October 2021.

Party	2017	2021	Current Municipal Assembly
Georgian Dream	26	21	
United National Movement	5	15	
For Georgia	1 (Note: Split from GD.)	1	
Ahali		1 (Note: Split from UNM.)	
People's Power		1 (Note: Split from GD.)	
European Georgia	2		
Alliance of Patriots	1		
Total	35	39	

== Education ==
There are 27 public and 1 private school as well as 32 nursery schools in the municipality. The number of pupils at schools is 8 728. There are 3 068 children enrolled in nursery schools.

There are 27 libraries (22 in the villages, 5 in the town), 1 youth house, 1 college, 1 university, 5 music schools, 1 professional music school and 1 art school in Telavi municipality.

== Culture ==
Telavi City

There are 3 museums in the municipality (Telavi Historical Museum, House museum of Alexander Chavchavadze in Tsinandali and Qvevri and Qvevri Wine Museum in Napareuli), Vazha-Pshavela Professional State Drama Theater of Telavi, Ketevan Iashvili Art Gallery, Song and dance ensemble and a Cultural Center, which includes village culture houses, music bands – "Ghamurebi" (The Bats) and "Musikis Qalaqi" (City of music); Ensembles – "Tsinandali" and "Patara Kakhi"; Women's folk ensemble "Telavi", "Women's Trio" and women's chamber choir – "Kakhetis Hangebi".

=== Festivals and public holidays ===
Various festivals visited by many international and local visitors are held throughout the municipality during the year.

Event	Date	Description
"Erekleoba"	7 November	To celebrate the anniversary of King Heraclius II, Erekleoba is held in Telavi on 7 November every year. During the day, a service commemorating the soul of King Heraclius II is held, as well as exhibitions, concerts, and awards of honorable Telavi residents are being organized.
Tsinandali Music Festival	September	Every year in September, the festival hosts classical, chamber, and solo concerts at the Tsinandali Historical Estate. Georgian and foreign musicians participate in the festival.
Wine Festival "Telavino"	October	The festival brings together wine companies and small entrepreneurs who are allowed to exhibit their wine. Concerts of local and invited musical bands are held at the festival.
Festival of Classical Music	Autumn	Every autumn Telavi hosts a music festival where international, as well as Georgian musicians, participate. Music masterclasses are held along with concerts.

== Sport ==
St. George of Shalauri

A complex of Telavi tennis courts operates in Telavi Municipality. It combines 6 clay courts equipped with modern infrastructure and 2 artificial grass courts, where the training of athletes and international tournaments are held.

A football school "Telavi" is operating in Telavi Givi Chokheli Stadium.

The union of Sports Clubs Telavi operates in the Telavi Tamaz Antadze Sports Complex and includes basketball, rugby, handball, volleyball, rhythmic gymnastics, chess, sports shooting, billiards, and table tennis clubs.

Wrestling Sports School Telavi operates in Mirian Tsalkalamanidze Sports School and combines Georgian wrestling, judo, sambo, freestyle wrestling, karate, boxing, and arm wrestling.

The rugby stadium Caucasus Arena was built in Telavi in 2018, where the match of the European Championship was held.

== Tourism ==
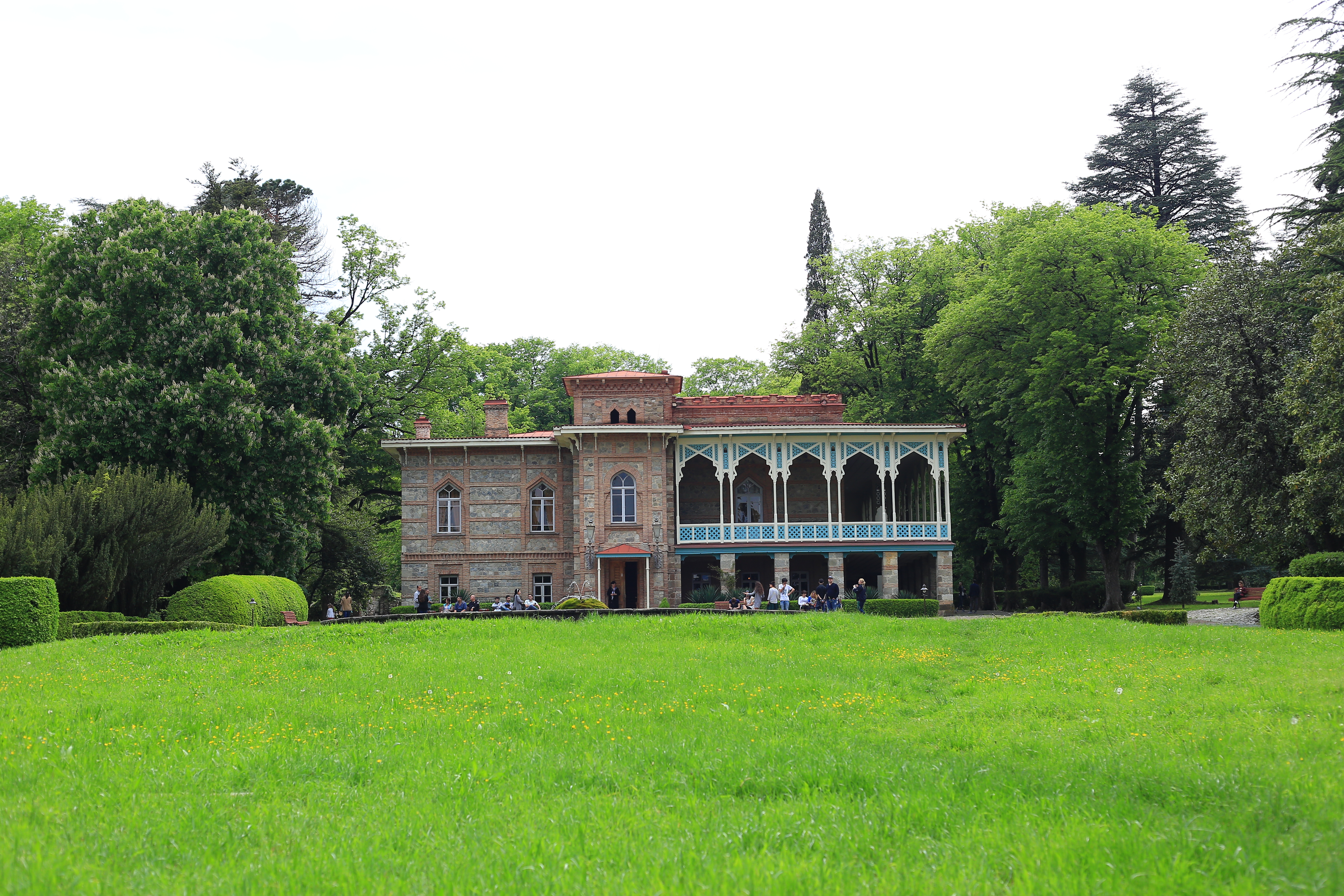
Tsinandali residence

There is a Tourism Information Center in Telavi, which provides foreign and local visitors with the necessary information on tourist infrastructure, architectural and archeological monuments, cultural events, festivals, public holidays, protected areas, transport, and other interesting issues.

=== Number of visitors ===
According to 2019 data, the total number of visitors to the hotels, museums (House Museum of Alexander Chavchavadze and Telavi Historical Museum), and the information center was 132,352 out of which 4647 visitors visited the "Telavi Tourism Information Center".

=== Types of tourism in the municipality ===
1. Cultural-religious tourism
2. Wine tourism
3. Festival tourism
4. Gastronomy tourism
5. Agrotourism

== Economy ==
The leading sectors of the economy are viticulture, horticulture, grain production, production of essential oils, meat, and milk. Important enterprises are wineries, family wineries, food, and light industry facilities. There is a railway line and a highway in the territory of the municipality.

Telavi Airport Mimino is located on the territory of Telavi Municipality, where the internship programs of the Georgian Aviation University are carried out.

== Historical landmarks and sightseeing ==
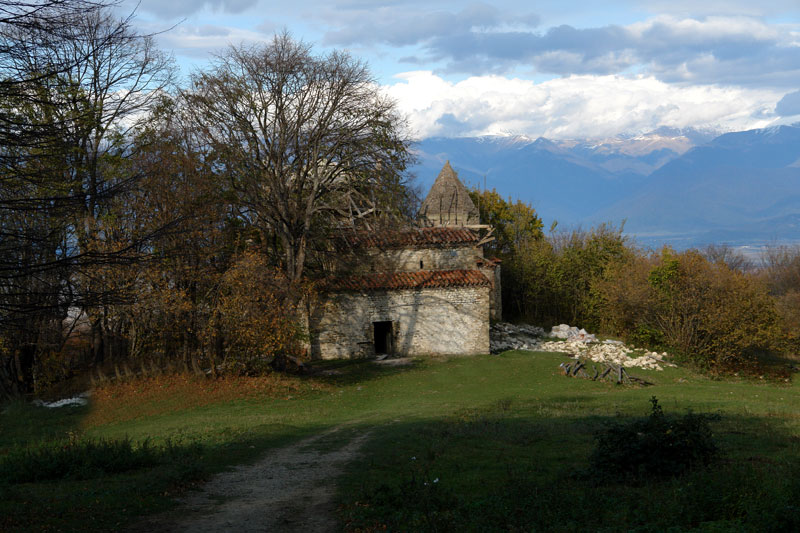
Old Shuamta

The architectural complex of Batonis Tsikhe located in the city of Telavi is a monument of cultural heritage with its architectural-historical features. The palace of King Erekle II is the only survived royal palace in Georgia.

The architectural complex includes the Palace of the Kakhetian Kings, a court church of Erekle II, a court church of King Archil, a castle fence, a bath, and a tunnel on the territory of the palace. Outside the fence is the largest bastion tower in Georgia.

A centuries-old plane tree (Platanus) stands in the center of the city of Telavi, the circumference of which reaches 12 meters. It is the largest plane tree in Georgia and is more than 900 years old.

Other notable architectural monuments include Vanta Palace Complex, Adamaant Castle, and others.

One of the architectural monuments in Telavi municipality is the Ikalto Monastery complex, which was founded by one of the Assyrian fathers Zenon Ikaltoeli in the 6th century. The old Shuamta Monastery is also noteworthy. The ensemble includes a 5th-century basilica, a domed and a small domed church. In the 16th century, the old Shuamta Monastery was emptied. The daughter of Tinatin Gurieli, the wife of King Levan II of Kakheti, founded a new monastery near Shuamta near her. In the village of Kisiskhevi stands the ancient (6th-7th centuries) Church of the Mother of God. Mamadaviti Monastery is located near the village of Akura. Monuments of historical significance are also preserved in the village of Ruispiri.

Lopota Lake is located on the territory of the municipality, around which the tourist infrastructure is developed: hotels, indoor and outdoor pools, fitness center, basketball and handball courts, mini-golf course, fishing area, stalls, Lopota Forest Spa, restaurants, Chateau Buera, Open bungalows and other entertainment facilities for both adults and children.

There are many wine and cheese companies, organic farms, and family wineries in Telavi Municipality, which are often visited by local and foreign visitors.

Historical sites include:

- Ikalto Monastery complex
- Old Shuamta
- Alexander Chavchavadze House-Museum of Tsinandali
- Erekle II Palace (Telavi Historical-Ethnographic Museum)

== Notable people ==
Photo	Name	Years	Description
	Alexander Chavchavadze	1786–1846	Lieutenant General of the Russian Imperial Army, poet, translator, winemaker.
	Ketevan Iashvili	1883–1980	Painter, patron, collector.
	Elene Akhvlediani	1898–1975	Georgian painter, graphic artist, theater and film artist.
	Vakhtang Bochorishvili	1924–2002	Doctor of Medicine, Professor.
	Givi Chokheli	1937–1994	Georgian and Soviet football player and coach.
	Kakhi Asatiani	1947–2002	Georgian and Soviet football player, midfielder.
	Zaza Kolelishvili	1957–	Georgian actor, director, screenwriter, producer, production artist.
	Ana Matnadze	1983–	Chess player, International Grandmaster.
	Lela Javakhishvili	1984–	Chess player, International Grandmaster, 2008 Chess Olympics Champion.
	Bela Khotenashvili	1988–	Chess player, International Grandmaster.

== Twin towns – sister Municipalities ==
Telavi

- Anykščiai, Lithuania
- Balta, Ukraine
- Bešeňová, Slovakia
- Biberach an der Riss, Germany
- Hlybokaye, Belarus
- Kėdainiai, Lithuania
- Kletsk, Belarus
- Laoag, Philippines
- Shaki, Azerbaijan
- Talsi, Latvia
- Viljandi, Estonia

== See also ==
- List of municipalities in Georgia (country)
