= Gulgula =

Gulgula გულგულა
- Village
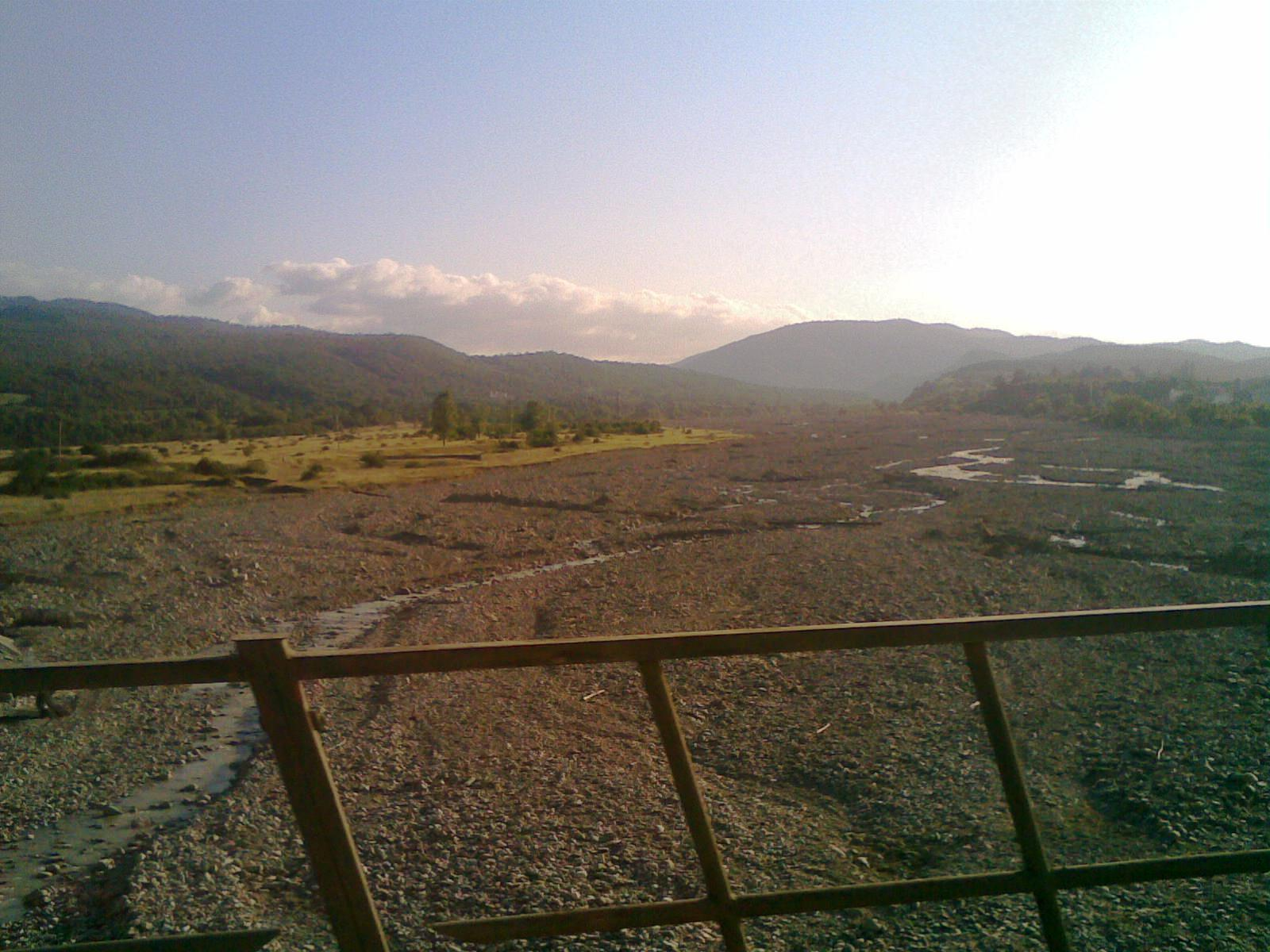
- River Turdo

- Location within Georgia
- Coordinates: 41°58′00″N 45°28′40″E
- Country: Georgia
- Region: Kakheti
- District: Telavi

Population (2014)
  - Total: 1,108 ▼
- Time zone: UTC+4:00
- Area code: +995

Gulgula (Georgian: გულგულა), is a village in Telavi district of Georgia. The village is located near the Alazani Valley.

== Demography ==
Census Year	population
2002	1252
2014	1108 ▼

== See also ==
- Telavi Municipality
