= Busheti =

Busheti ბუშეტი
- Village
- Location within Georgia
- Coordinates: 41°52′53″N 45°36′13″E
- Country: Georgia
- Region: Kakheti
- Municipality: Telavi

Population (2014)
  - Total: 1,090
- Time zone: UTC+4:00

Busheti (Georgian: ბუშეტი), is a village in Telavi district of Georgia.

== See also ==
- Telavi Municipality
- Tsinandali
