= Lapanquri =

Lapanquri ლაფანყური
- Village
- Village Lapanquri

- Telavi district

- Location within Georgia
- Coordinates: 42°3′43″N 45°35′28″E
- Country: Georgia
- Region: Kakheti
- District: Telavi
- Established: 1905-1908

Population (2014)
  - Total: 620 ▼
- Time zone: UTC+4:00
- Postal code: 2210
- Area code: +995

Lapanquri (Georgian: ლაფანყური) is a village in the Telavi district of Georgia. It is located near the Alazani Valley.

== Name ==
Its name probably derives from the Pterocarya trees (Georgian: ლაფანი lapani) which are found around the village.

== Demography ==
Census Year	population
2002	904
2014	620 ▼

== Gallery ==
Church

Bridge over the river Lopota

== See also ==
- Telavi Municipality
