= Akura, Georgia =

Akura აკურა
- Village
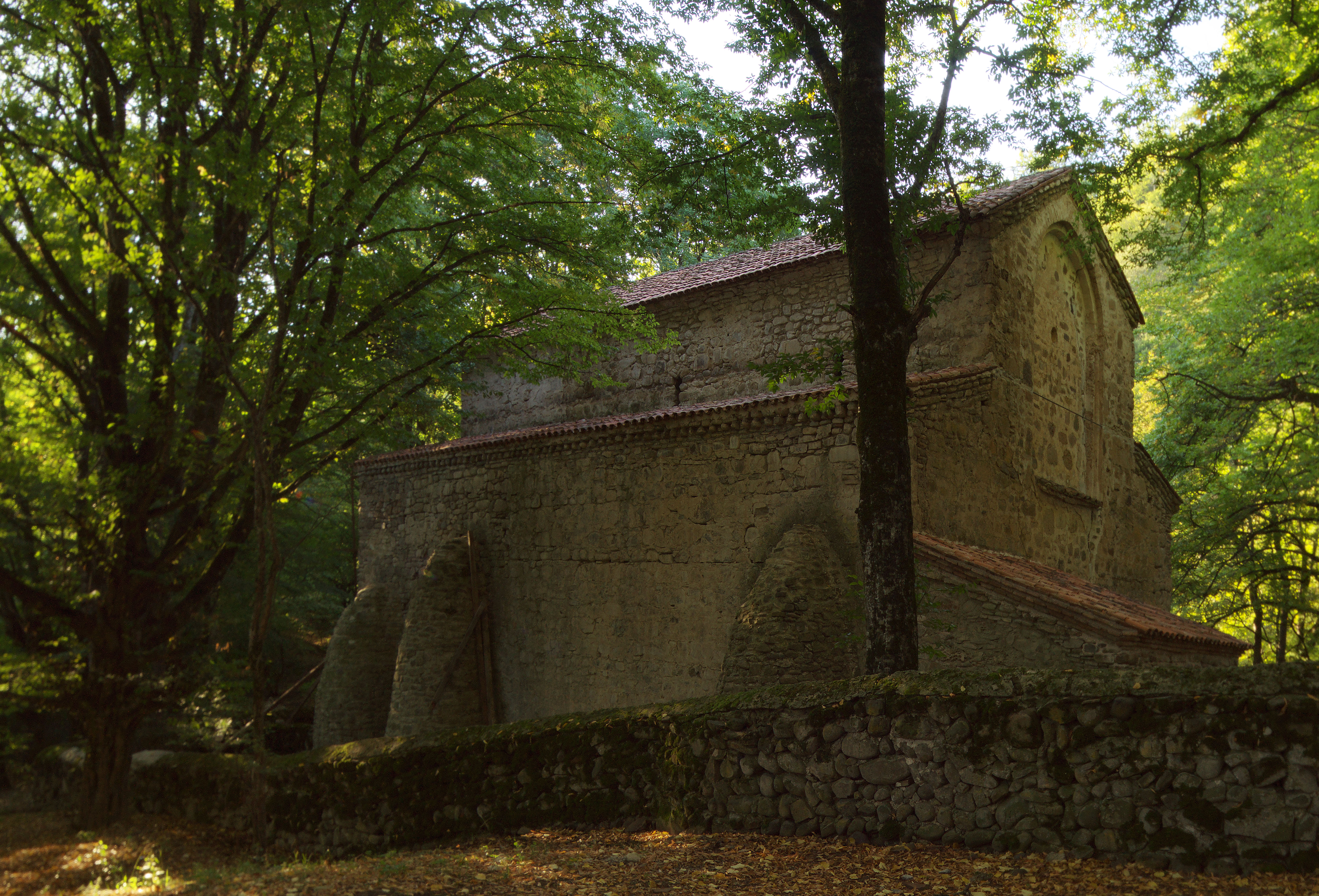

- Location within Georgia Location within Kakheti
- Coordinates: 41°51′54″N 45°37′27″E
- Country: Georgia
- Mkhare: Kakheti
- Municipality: Telavi

Population (2014)
  - Total: 1,869
- Time zone: UTC+4:00
- Area code: +995

Akura (Georgian: აკურა), is a village in Telavi Municipality of Georgia.

== See also ==
- Telavi Municipality
- Tsinandali
