= Kurdghelauri =

Kurdghelauri კურდღელაური
- Village
- Location within Georgia
- Coordinates: 41°55′55″N 45°29′45″E
- Country: Georgia
- Region: Kakheti
- District: Telavi

Population (2014)
  - Total: 3,962 ▼
- Time zone: UTC+4:00
- Area code: +995

Kurdghelauri (Georgian: კურდღელაური), is a village in the Telavi district of Georgia.

== Demography ==
Census Year	population
2002	4202
2014	3962 ▼

== See also ==
- Telavi Municipality
