= Kondoli, Telavi =

Kondoli კონდოლი
- Village
- Location within Georgia
- Coordinates: 41°55′11″N 45°34′41″E
- Country: Georgia
- Region: Kakheti
- District: Telavi

Population (2014)
  - Total: 2,188 ▼
- Time zone: UTC+4:00
- Area code: +995

Kondoli (Georgian: კონდოლი), is a village in the Telavi district of Georgia.

== Demography ==
Census Year	population
2002	2489
2014	2188 ▼

== See also ==
- Telavi Municipality
