= Akhateli =

Akhateli ახატელი
- Village
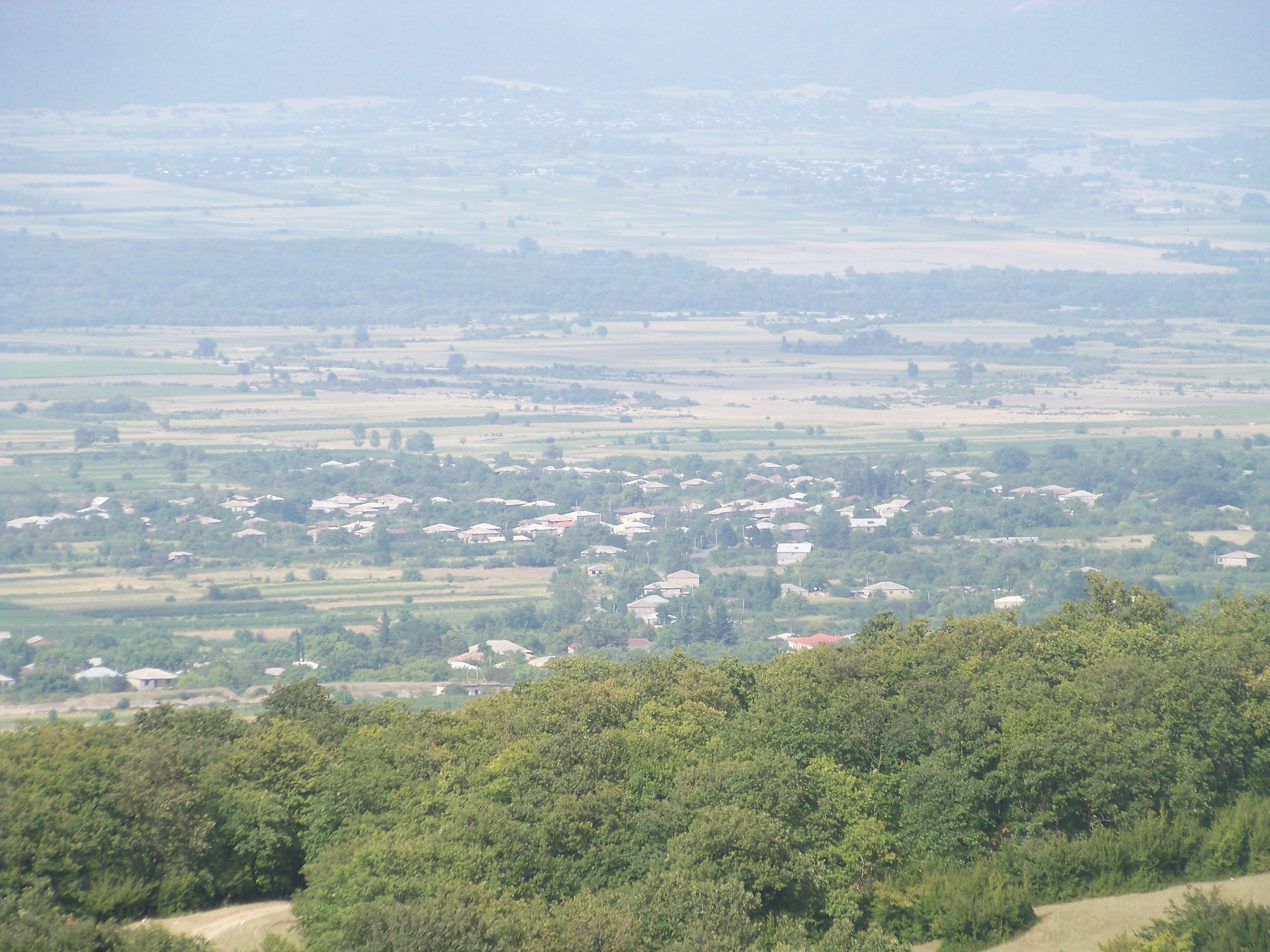
- Interactive map of Akhateli
- Coordinates: 41°58′15″N 45°25′19″E
- Country: Georgia
- Mkhare: Kakheti
- Municipality: Telavi

Population (2014)
  - Total: 271
- Time zone: UTC+4:00
- Area code: +995

Akhateli (Georgian: ახატელი), is a village in Telavi district of Georgia. The village is located on the river Turdo.

== See also ==
- Telavi Municipality
