= Lechuri =

Lechuri ლეჩური
- Village

- Location within Georgia
- Coordinates: 42°08′33″N 45°24′54″E
- Country: Georgia
- Region: Kakheti
- District: Telavi

Population (2014)
  - Total: 88 ▼
- Time zone: UTC+4:00
- Area code: +995

Lechuri (Georgian: ლეჩური), is a village in the Telavi district of Georgia.

== Demography ==
Census Year	population
2002	160
2014	88 ▼

== See also ==
- Telavi Municipality
