= Jughaani =

Jughaani ჯუღაანი
- Village
- Location within Georgia
- Coordinates: 42°3′29″N 45°29′2″E
- Country: Georgia
- Region: Kakheti
- District: Telavi

Population (2014)
  - Total: 178 ▼
- Time zone: UTC+4:00
- Area code: +995

Jughaani (Georgian: ჯუღაანი), is a village in the Telavi district of Georgia.

== Demography ==
Census Year	population
2002	241
2014	178 ▼

== See also ==
- Telavi Municipality
