= Lopota =

River in Georgia

- Location within Georgia Location within Kakheti
- Native name: ლოპოტა (Georgian)

Location
- Country: Georgia

Physical characteristics
- Mouth: Alazani
  - coordinates: 42.0066°N 45.4963°E
- Length: 33 km (21 mi)
- Basin size: 263 km^{2} (102 sq mi)

Basin features
- Progression: Alazani→ Kura→ Caspian Sea

The Lopota (Georgian: ლოპოტა) is a river in the far north-eastern part of the Kakheti region in Georgia. It flows through the village Lapanquri, and discharges into the Alazani near Telavi. Its upper reach borders with the Russian North Caucasian Republic of Dagestan and was scene of a Georgian anti-insurgency operation in August 2012.
