= Nadikvari =

Nadikvari ნადიკვარი
- Village
- Location within Georgia
- Coordinates: 41°52′01″N 45°19′12″E
- Country: Georgia
- Region: Kakheti
- District: Telavi

Population (2014)
  - Total: 69
- Time zone: UTC+4:00
- Postal code: 2205
- Area code: +995

Nadikvari (Georgian: ნადიკვარი) is a village in the Telavi district of Georgia.

== See also ==
- Telavi Municipality
