= Kvemo Khodasheni =

Kvemo Khodasheni ქვემო ხოდაშენი
- Village
- Location within Georgia
- Coordinates: 41°53′09″N 45°35′13″E
- Country: Georgia
- Region: Kakheti
- District: Telavi

Area
  - Total: 1,698 km^{2} (656 sq mi)

Population (2014)
  - Total: 1,277 ▼
  - Density: 0.7521/km^{2} (1.948/sq mi)
- Time zone: UTC+4:00
- Area code: +995

Kvemo Khodasheni (Georgian: ქვემო ხოდაშენი), is a village in the Telavi district of Georgia.

== Demography ==
Census Year	population
2002	1553
2014	1277 ▼

== See also ==
- Telavi Municipality
