= Arg of Karim Khan =

Citadel in Shiraz, Iranian national heritage site

Coordinates: 29.6174°N 52.5446°E

Karim Khan Citadel
- ارگ کریم خان زند
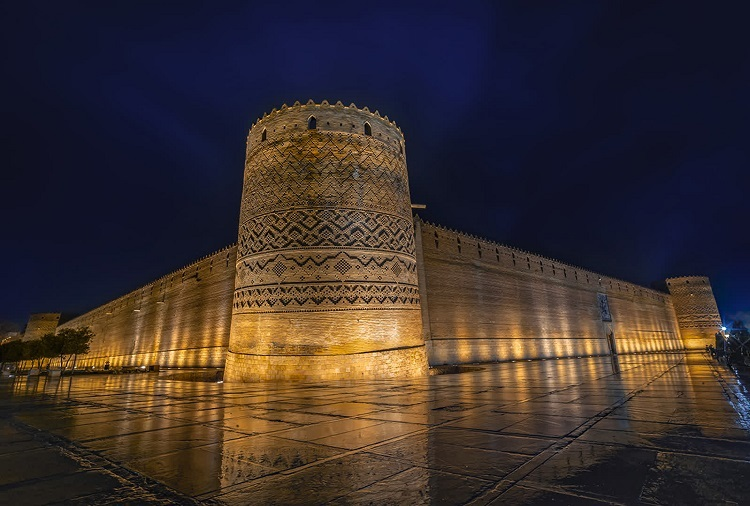
- Former names: Arg of Karim Khan

General information
- Type: Castle
- Architectural style: Iranian architecture
- Location: Shiraz, Iran
- Construction started: 1766
- Completed: 1767

Height
- Height: 14 m

Technical details
- Structural system: Imperial resident, Military. (later prison)
- Size: 4.000 m2

Design and construction
- Architect: Karim Khan Zand
- Engineer: A team of engineers all from Zand territories

The Arg of Karim Khan (Persian: ارگ کریم خان, romanized: Arg-e Karim Khān) or Karim Khan Citadel, is a citadel located in central Shiraz, Iran. It was built as part of a complex during the Zand era. It is named after Karim Khan Zand, and served as his living quarters. It is rectangular in shape and resembles a medieval fortress. In the past, the citadel was sometimes used as a prison. Today, it is a museum operated by Iran's Cultural Heritage Organization.

== History ==
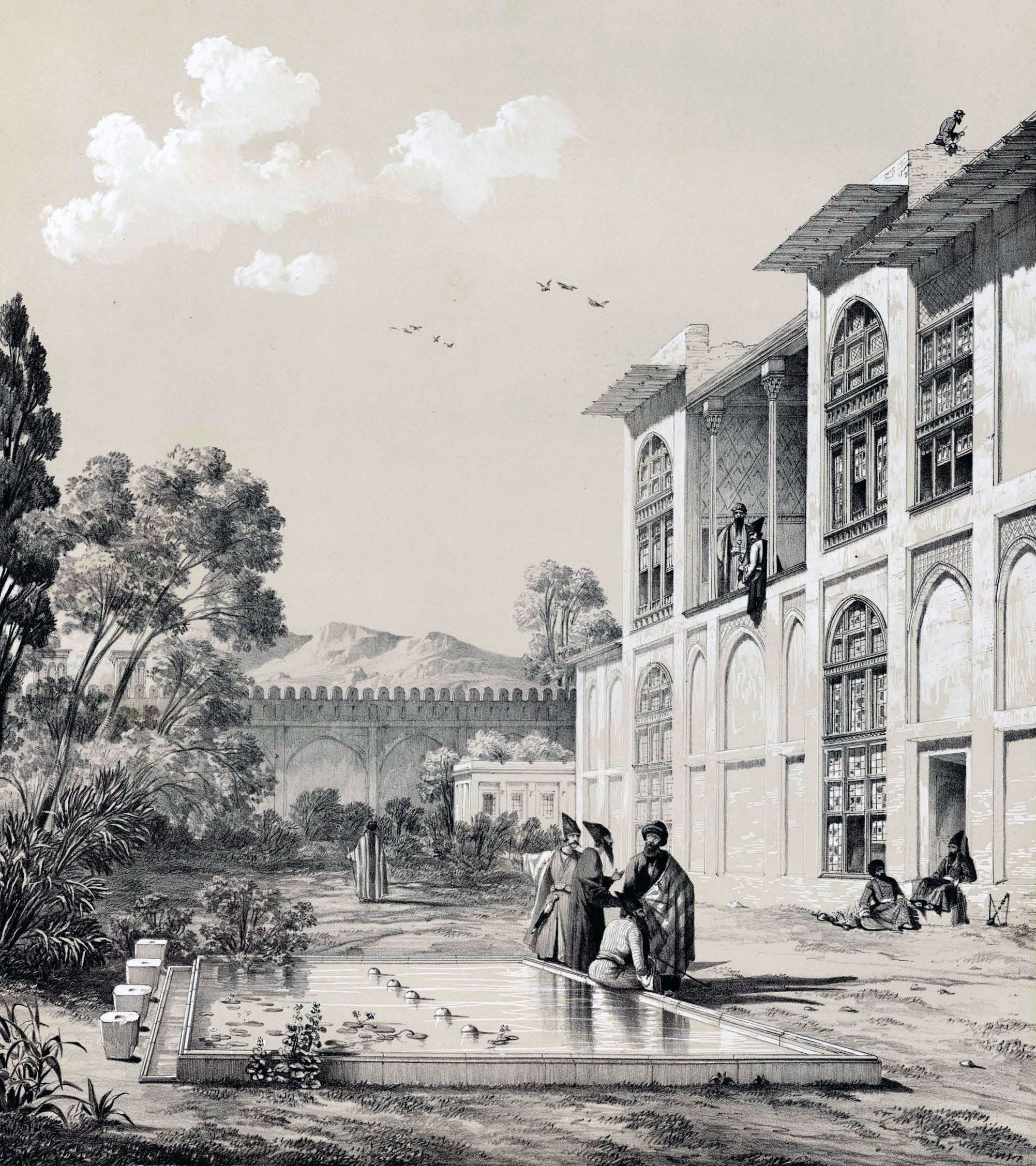
Drawing of the Arg by Eugène Flandin, 1840

Karim Khan citadel is located at the beginning of Karim Khan Zand (Shiraz) street on the corner of the Municipality Square (Shahrdari). Karim Khan was influenced by Safavid architecture when his government was established in Shiraz. After visiting Isfahan's Naqsh-e Jahan Square, he decided to build a large square in northern Shiraz. This field was known as the Artillery Square. To the north of the square, Divan Karim Khan Square was located and to its east, Vakil Bazaar and several inns. To the south of the square, Vakil Bathhouse and Vakil Mosque were located. On the southwest, there was a garden, and to the west, the Arg citadel.

After the conquest of Shiraz by Agha Mohammad Khan Qajar, he decided to demolish Karim Khan's buildings in hostility to Karim Khan. Following this decision, a number of Zand era buildings were demolished, including the border fence built around Shiraz by Karim Khan. Fortunately, the Arg citadel was protected from demolition and was used as an emirate court appointed by the central government to Amiri and the Fars governorate.

== Description ==
Karim Khan Citadel is located at Shahrdari Square. It has a land area of 4,000 m^{2} and is in the center of a 12,800 m^{2} compound. It consists of four high walls connected by four 14 m round brick towers at a 90-degree angle. Each 12 m wall is 3 meters thick at the base and 2.8 meters at the top. The design of the citadel combines military and residential architecture, for it was the home of Karim Khan and the military center of the dynasty.

In 1827, James Edward Alexander described the citadel as being surrounded by a "deep wet ditch".

== Gallery ==
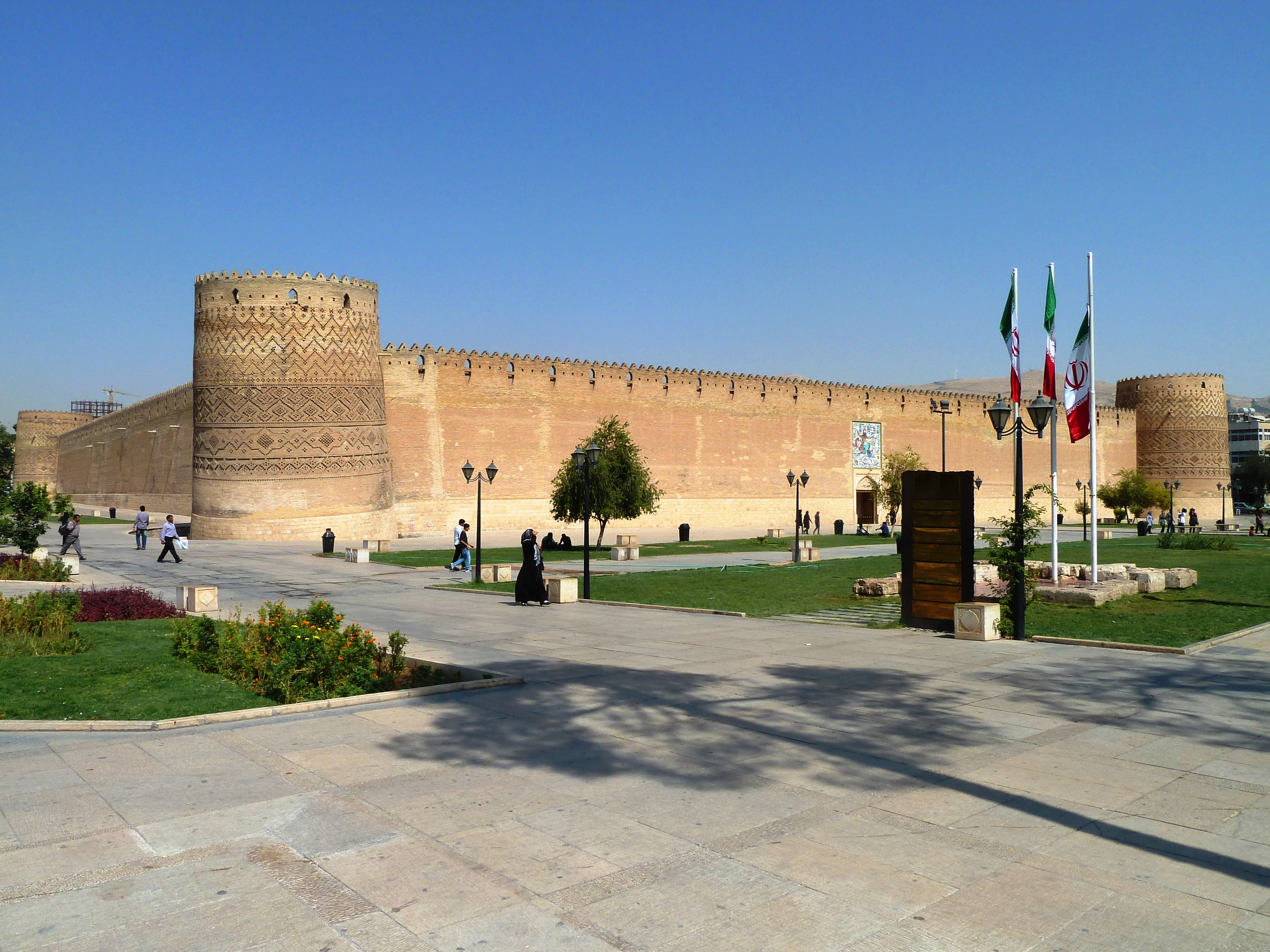
Exterior

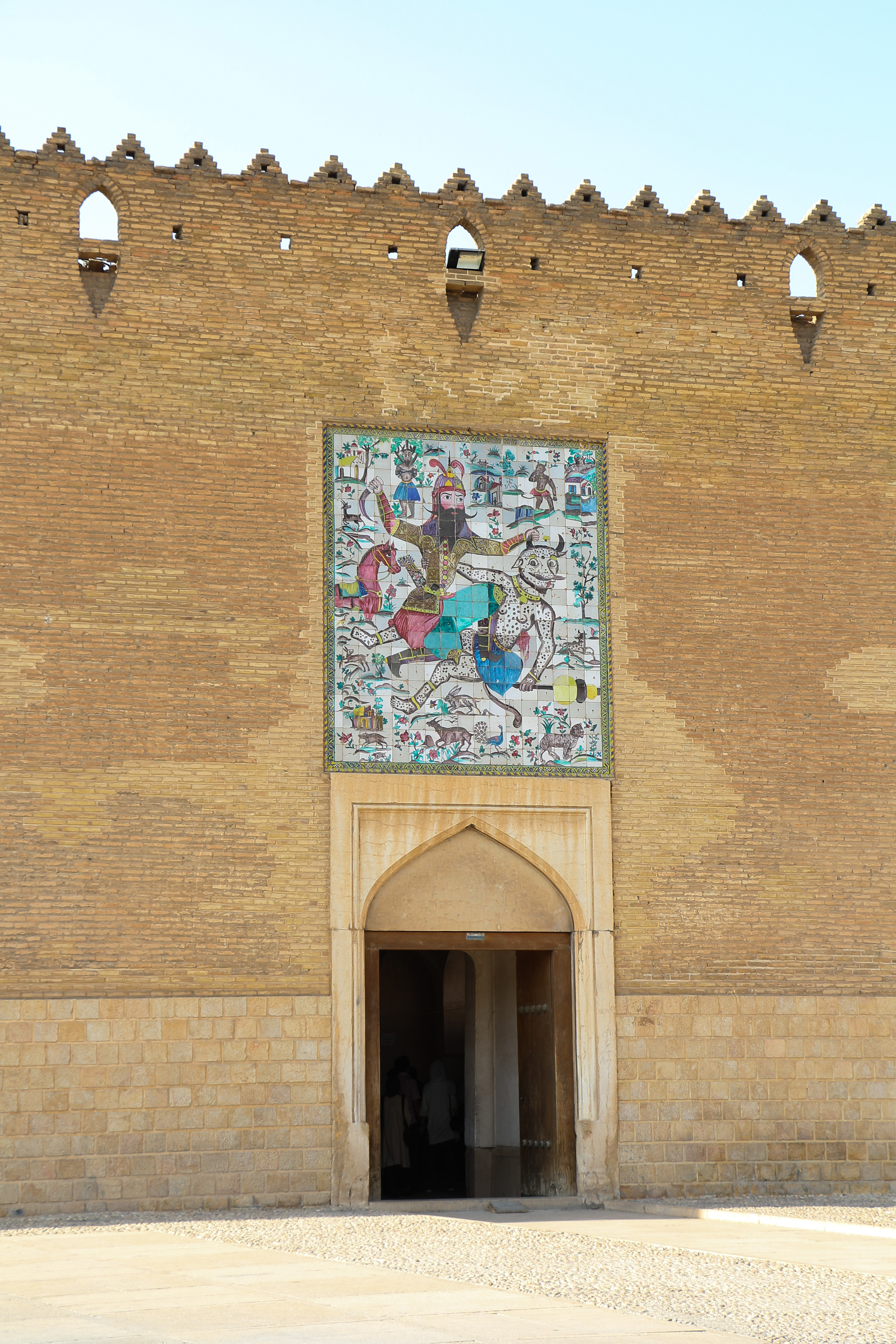
Entrance

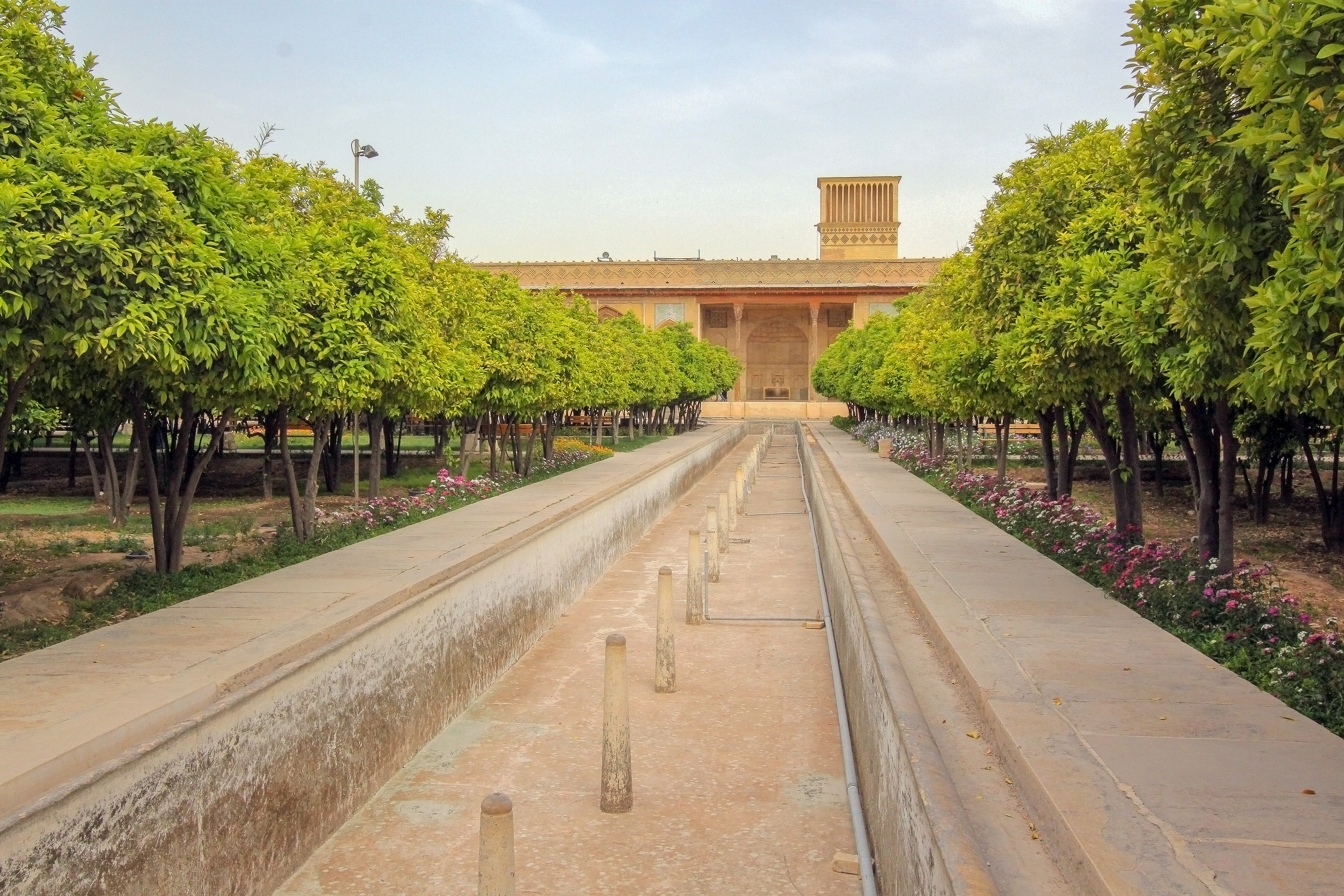
Courtyard

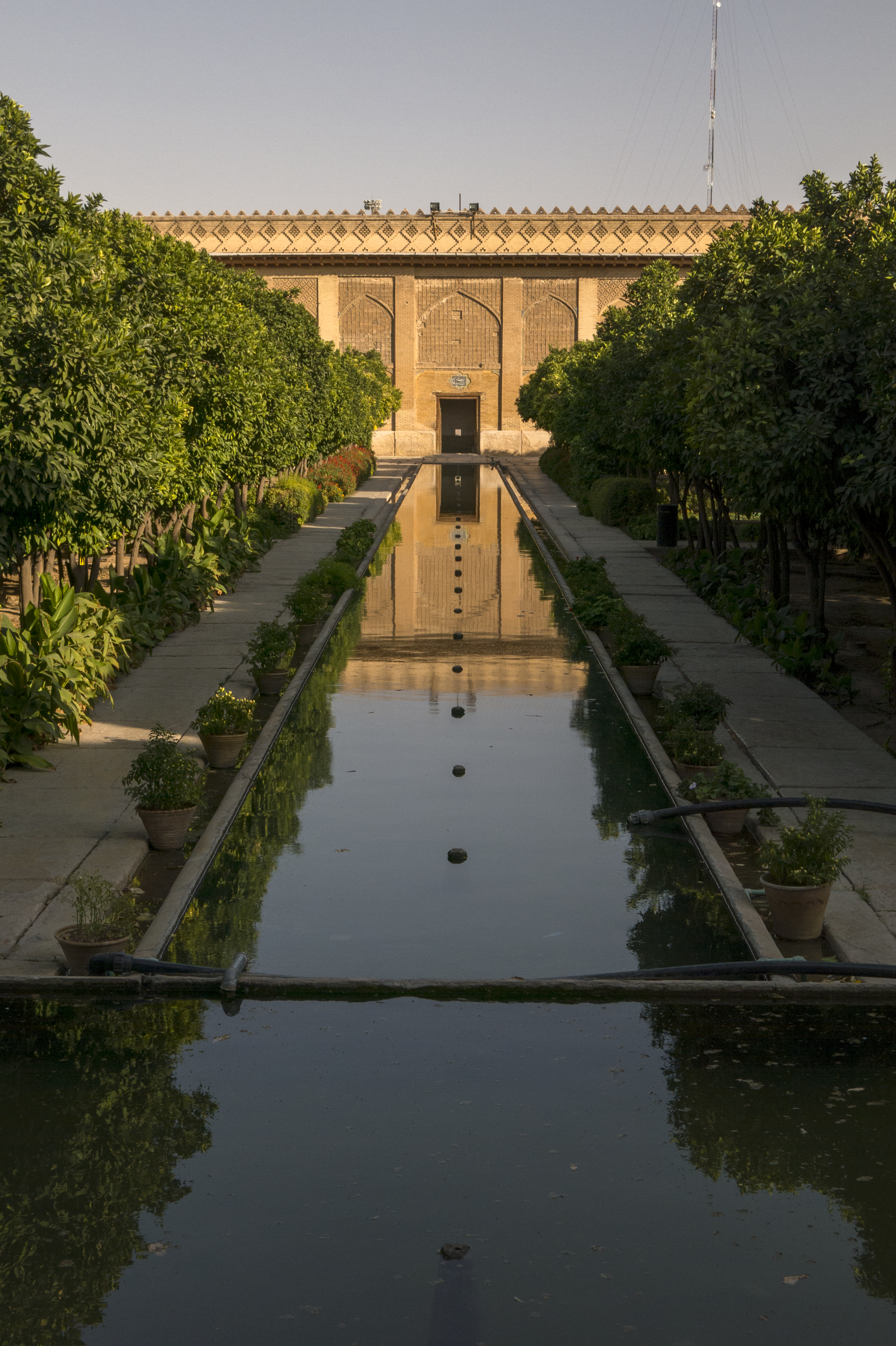
Courtyard

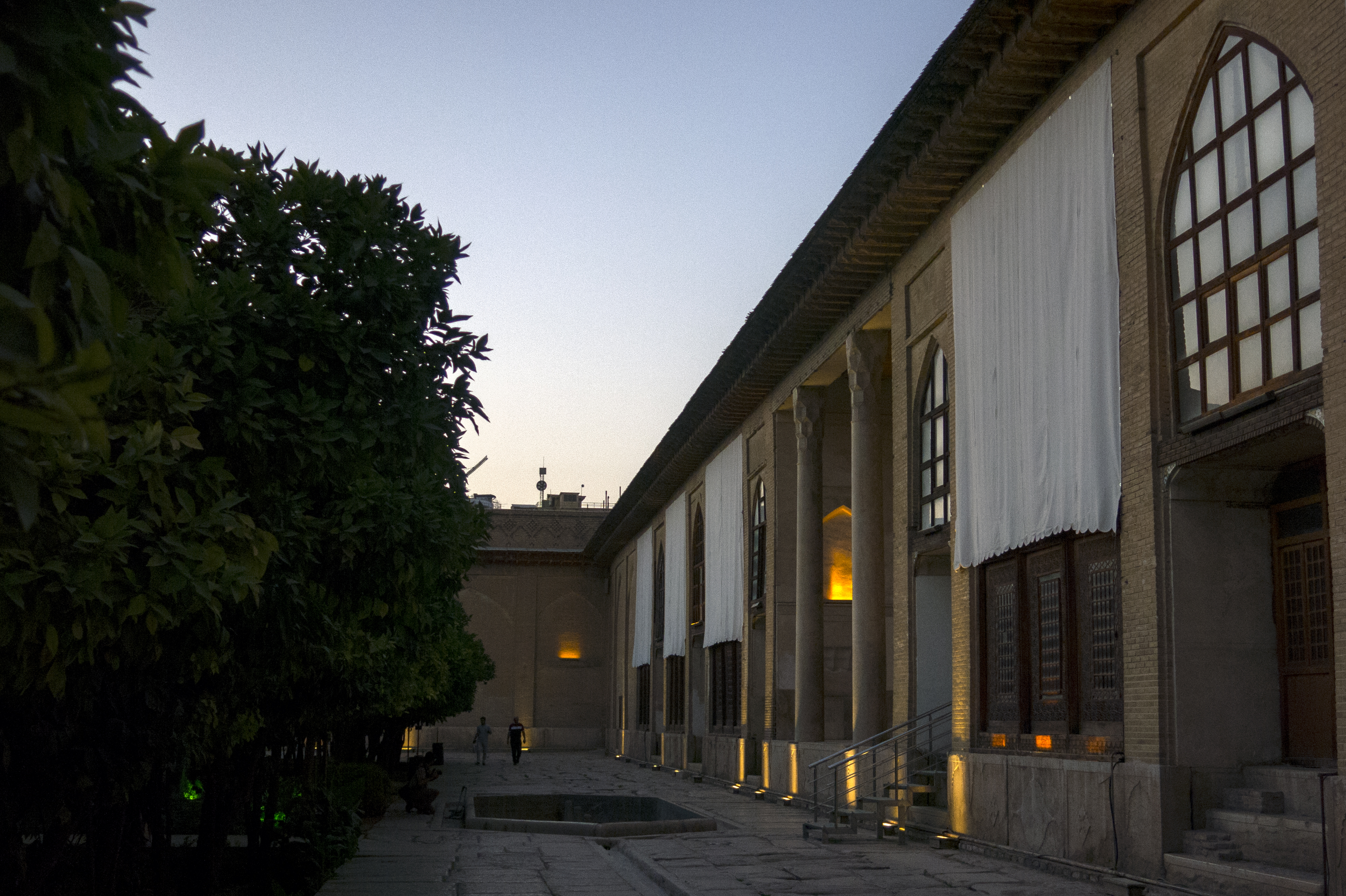
Courtyard

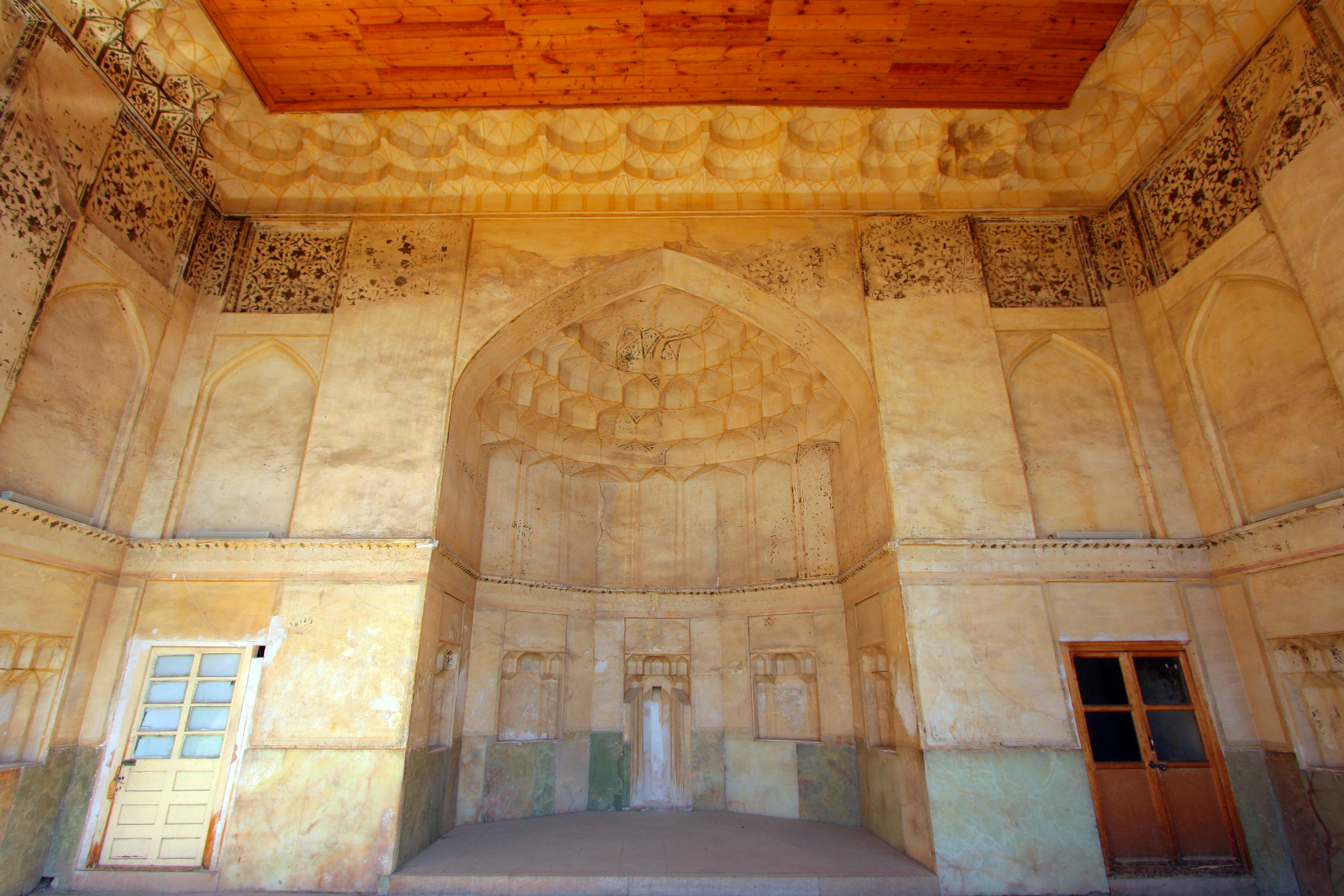
Interior

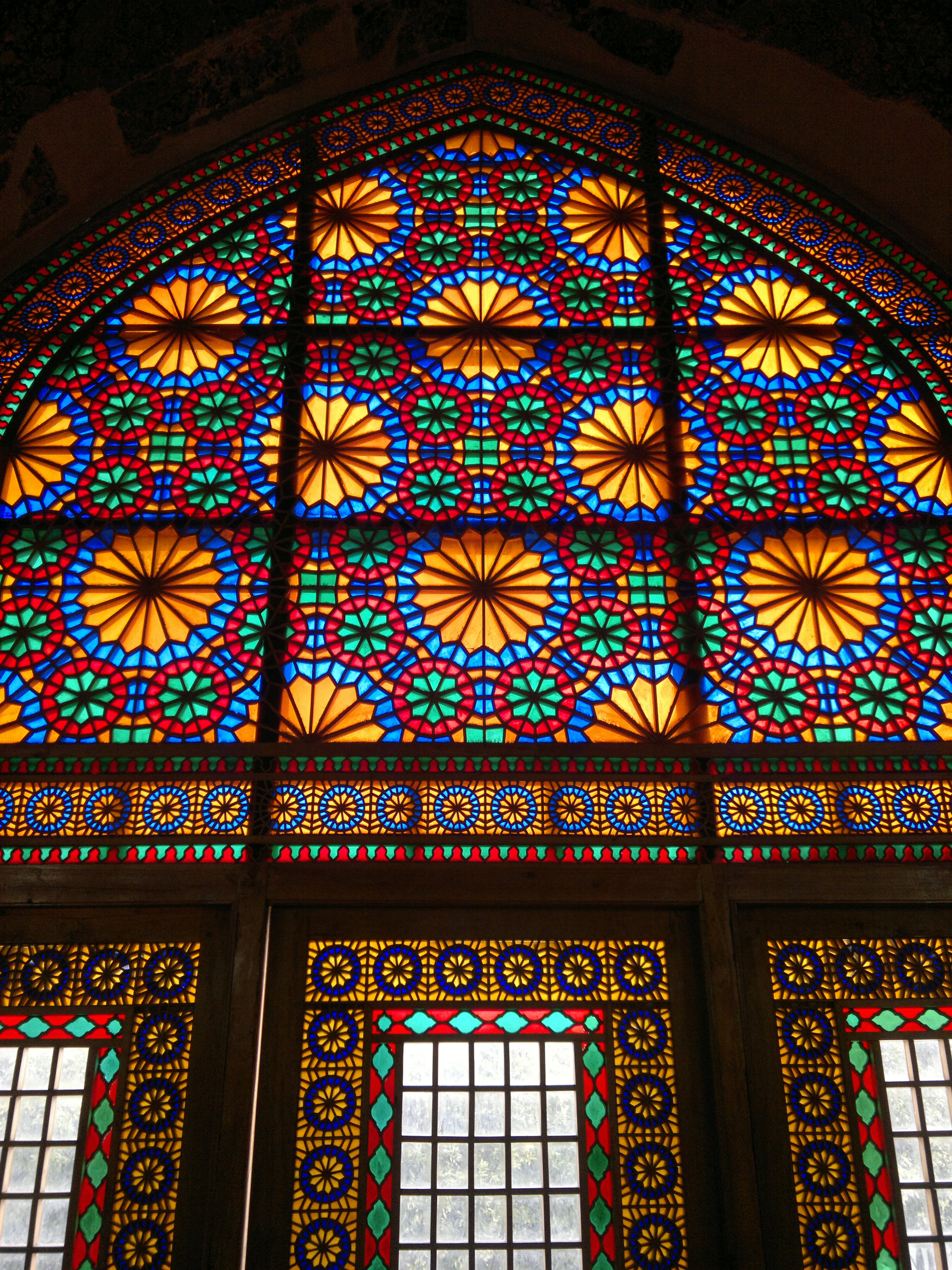
Windows

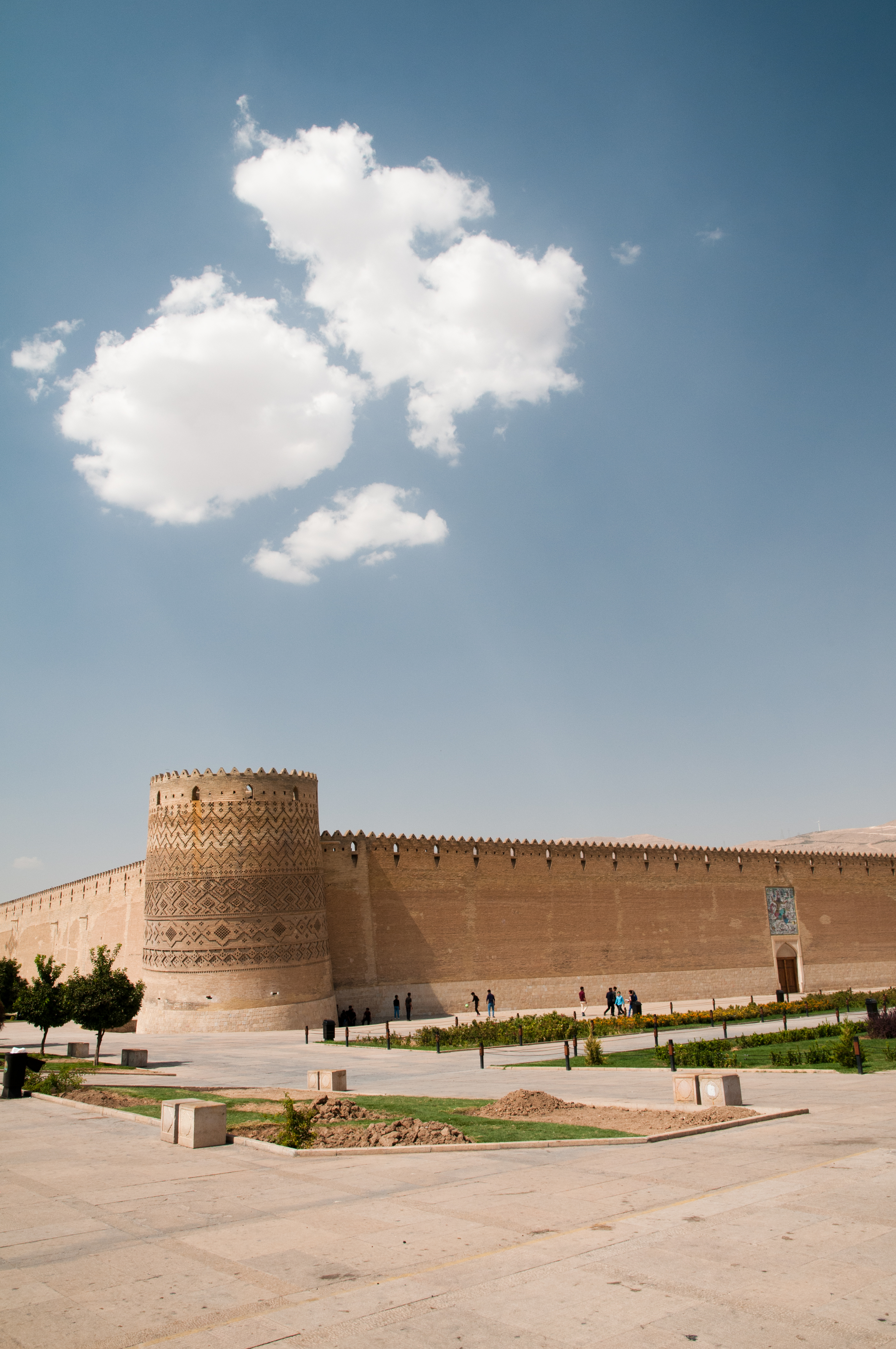
Exterior from the southeast, with children playing

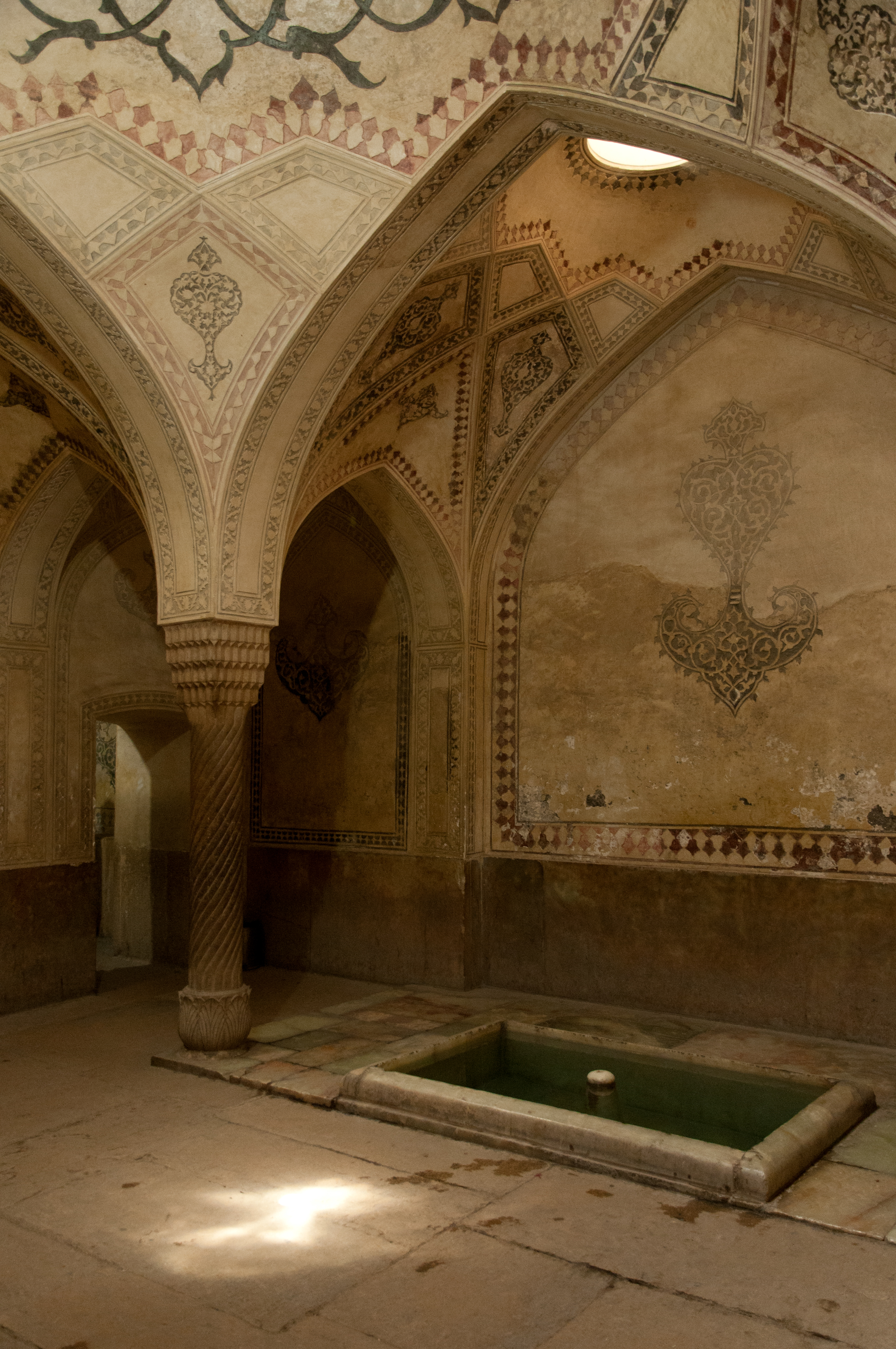
Interior of the hammam inside the citadel

== See also ==
- Batonis Castle
- Iranian architecture
- List of castles in Iran
- List of Kurdish castles
