= Artana, Georgia =

Artana ართანა
- Village
- Location within Georgia
- Coordinates: 42°4′21″N 45°30′13″E
- Country: Georgia
- Region: Kakheti
- Municipality: Telavi

Population (2014)
  - Total: 819
- Time zone: UTC+4:00
- Area code: +995

Artana (Georgian: ართანა), is a village in Telavi district of Georgia.

== See also ==
- Telavi Municipality
