= Nasamkhrali =

Nasamkhrali ნასამხრალი
- Village
- Location within Georgia
- Coordinates: 41°55′01″N 45°32′27″E
- Country: Georgia
- Region: Kakheti
- District: Telavi

Population (2014)
  - Total: 576
- Time zone: UTC+4 (GET)
- Area code: +995

Nasamkhrali (Georgian: ნასამხრალი, previously known as Nasomkhari (Georgian: ნასომხარი) until 1955) is a village in the Telavi district of Georgia.

== Demography ==
Census Year	population
2002	543
2014	576▲

== See also ==
- Telavi Municipality
