= Abas River =

Ancient river in Eurasia

The Abas River (Ancient Greek: Ἄβας), was a river of Iberia in Asia, mentioned by Plutarch (Plut. Pomp. 35) and Dio Cassius (37.3) as crossed by Pompey, on his expedition into the Caucasian regions. Its course was east of the Cambyses (likely the modern Iori); and it seems to be the same as the "Alazonius" or "Alazon" of Strabo and Pliny which fell into the Cambyses just above its confluence with the Cyrus River (modern-day Kura River). Thus, likely the modern Alazani River. The Battle of the Abas was fought on a plain adjacent to the river in 65 BCE.
