= Pshaveli =

Pshaveli ფშაველი
- Village
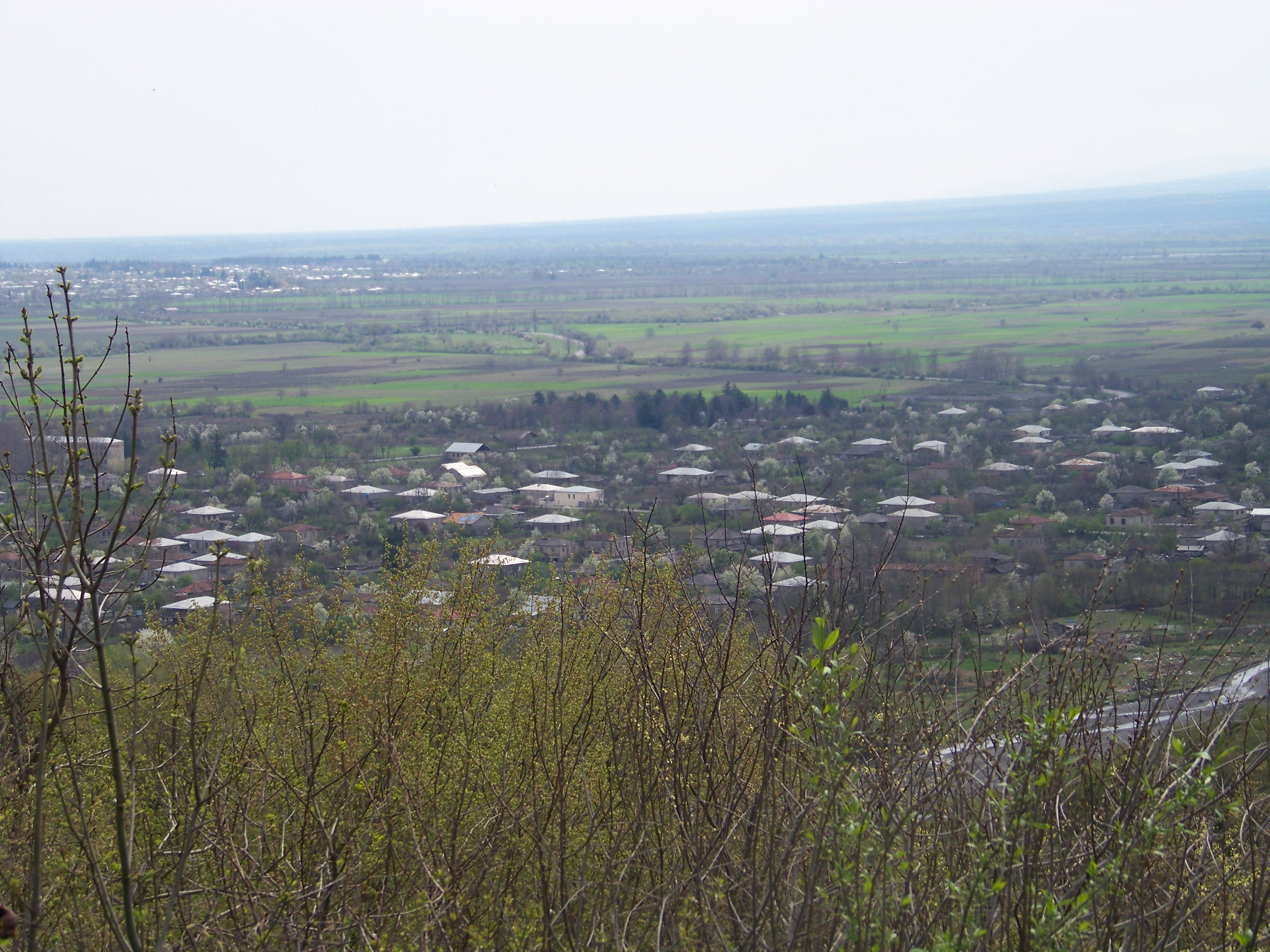
- View of Pshaveli from the Church of Tskarostavi

- Location within Georgia
- Coordinates: 42°05′32.3″N 45°26′27.8″E
- Country: Georgia
- Region: Kakheti
- District: Telavi
- Elevation: 460 m (1,510 ft)

Population (2014)
  - Total: 1,624
- Time zone: UTC+4 (GET)
- Area code: +995

Pshaveli (Georgian: ფშაველი) is a village in the Telavi district of Georgia.

== Demography ==
| Census Year | population |
|---|---|
| 2002 | 1926 |
| 2014 | 1624▼ |

== See also ==
- Telavi Municipality
