= Kisiskhevi =

Kisiskhevi კისისხევი
- Village
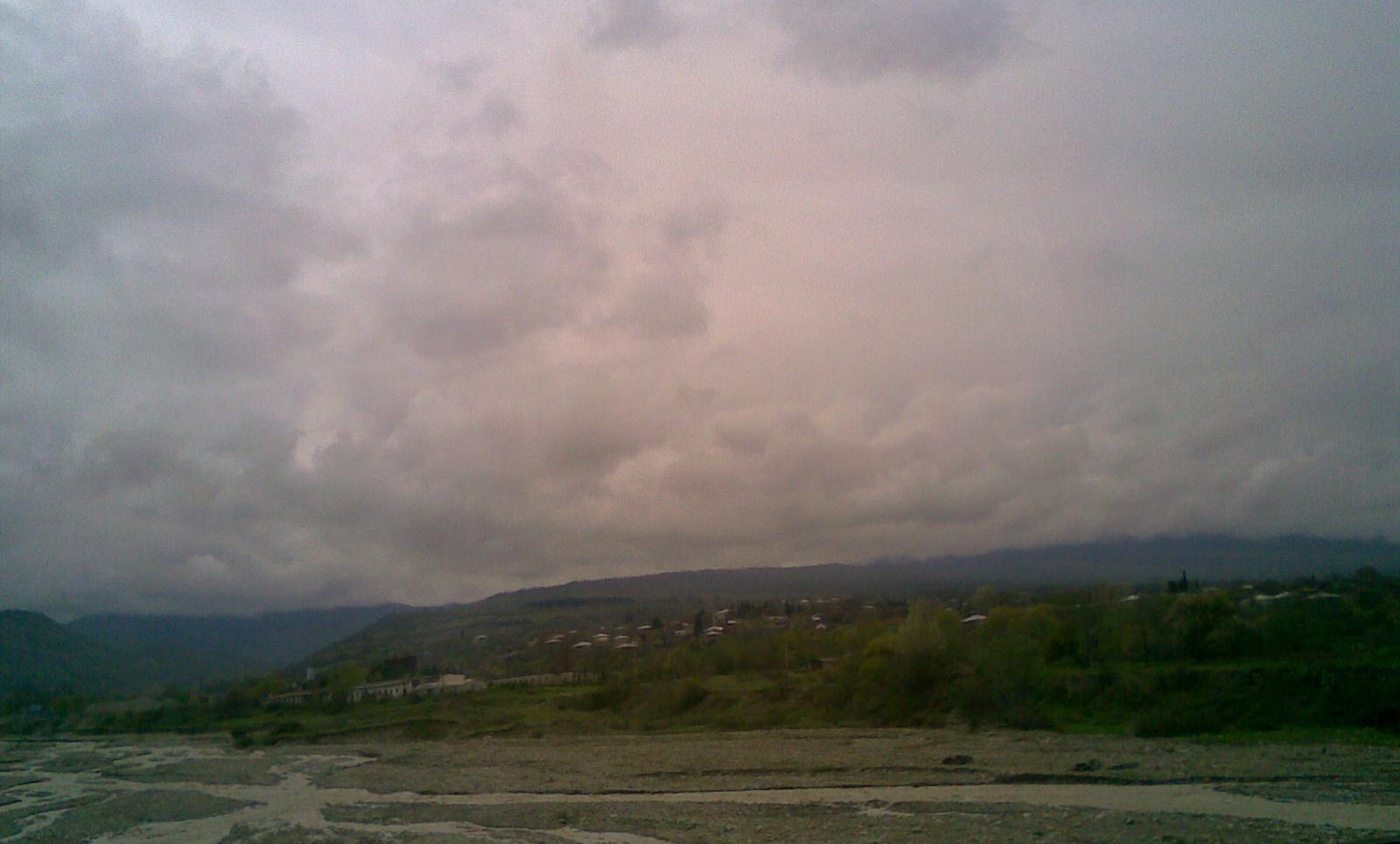

- Location within Georgia
- Coordinates: 41°53′52″N 45°32′37″E
- Country: Georgia
- Region: Kakheti
- District: Telavi

Population (2014)
  - Total: 1,916 ▼
- Time zone: UTC+4:00
- Area code: +995

Kisiskhevi (Georgian: კისისხევი), is a village in the Telavi district of Georgia.

== Demography ==
Census Year	population
2002	2223
2014	1916 ▼

== See also ==
- Telavi Municipality
