= Kobadze =

Kobadze კობაძე
- Village
- Location within Georgia
- Coordinates: 41°51′41″N 45°18′45″E
- Country: Georgia
- Region: Kakheti
- District: Telavi

Population (2014)
  - Total: 58 ▼
- Time zone: UTC+4:00
- Area code: +995

Kobadze (Georgian: კობაძე), is a village in the Telavi district of Georgia.

== Demography ==
Census Year	population
2002	104
2014	58 ▼

== See also ==
- Telavi Municipality
