= Lalisquri =

Lalisquri ლალისყური
- Village
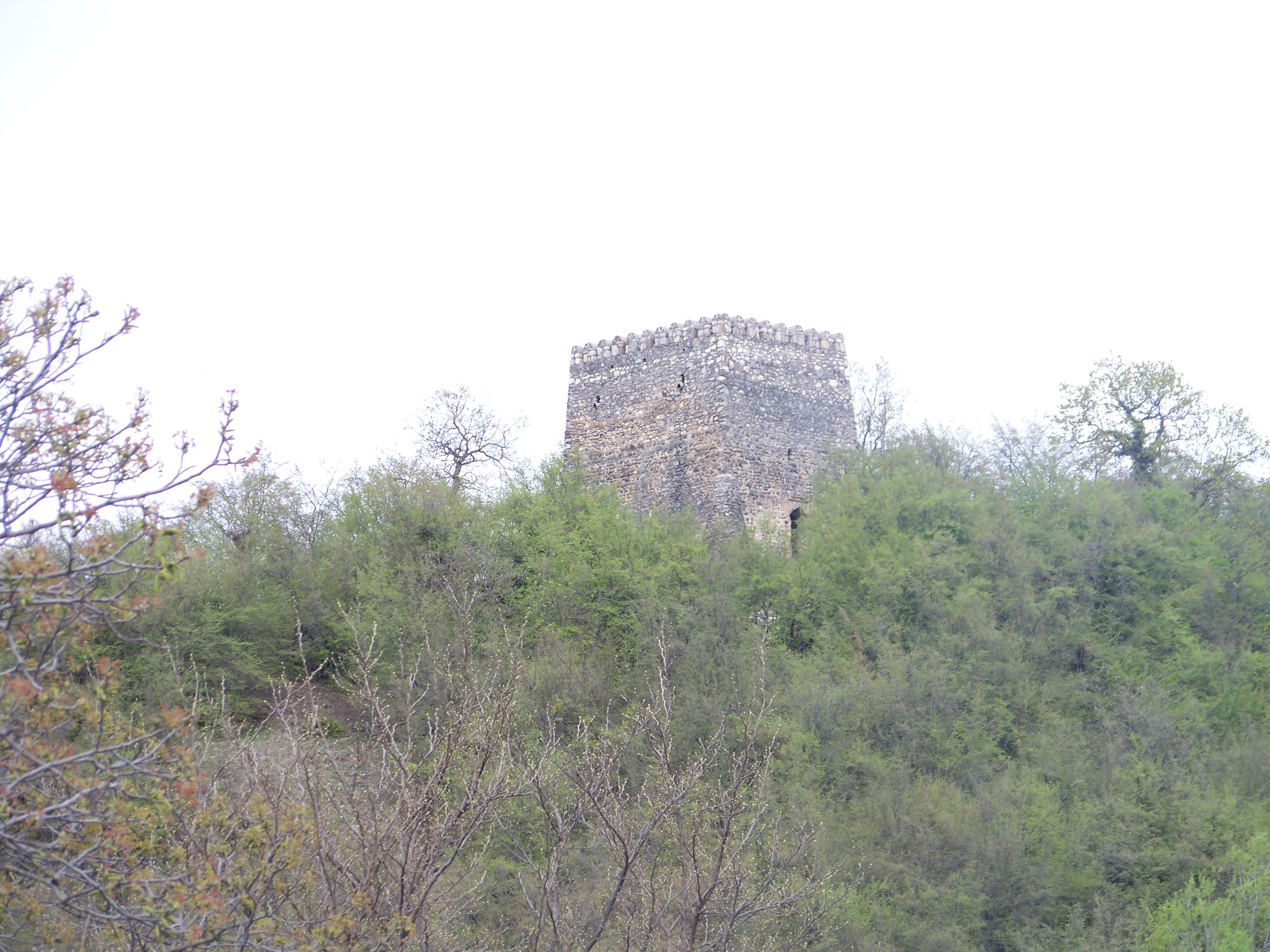
- Tower of Laliskuri

- Location within Georgia
- Coordinates: 42°04′21″N 45°25′15″E
- Country: Georgia
- Region: Kakheti
- District: Telavi
- Elevation: 440 m (1,440 ft)

Population (2014)
  - Total: 499 ▼
- Time zone: UTC+4:00
- Area code: +995

Lalisquri (Georgian: ლალისყური), is a village in the Telavi district of Georgia.

== Demography ==
Census Year	population
2002	657
2014	499 ▼

== See also ==
- Telavi Municipality
