= Lopota Resort =

Lopota Lake Resort & Spa
- Location within Kakheti Lopota Resort (Georgia)

General information
- Type: Hotel
- Location: Napareuli, Telavi, Georgia
- Coordinates: 42°03′20″N 45°31′38″E
- Opening: 2008

The Lopota Resort is a hotel complex located on the edges of Lopota Lake in Napareuli, in the Kakheti region of eastern Georgia, 100 km from the capital Tbilisi and 26 km from city of Telavi. The resort offers a recreation zone stretched over one million square meters. The resort boasts a lake surrounded by eight hotels. The complex is able to accommodate more than 200 people.

Lopota Resort's adventure center offers its guests wine tours, cultural tours in Kakheti region and other entertainment facilities.
