= Batoni Castle =

- ბატონის ციხე
- King's palace

- Location within Kakheti Location within Georgia

General information
- Status: Museum
- Type: Palace Complex
- Location: 1 Erekle II Avenue, Telavi, Georgia
- Coordinates: 41.917527°N 45.476375°E
- Elevation: 689 metres (2,260 ft)

Technical details
- Material: stone, Brick, Timber, Cement, Mortar, Lime

Immovable Cultural Monument of National Significance of Georgia
- Official name: Batoni Fortress of Telavi
- Designated: November 7, 2006; 19 years ago
- Reference no.: 81,82, 83, 84, 85, 86, 87, 88, 89
- Item Number in Cultural Heritage Portal: 14
- Date of entry in the registry: October 1, 2007; 18 years ago

Batoni Castle (Georgian: ბატონის ციხე, romanized: bat'onis tsikhe; lit. 'castle of lord'), is a 17th–18th century architectural monument in Telavi, the principal city of Georgia's eastern region of Kakheti. The Batonis Tsikhe complex includes some surviving sections of the Persian-style palace of the kings of Kakheti and a museum with archaeological and ethnographic exhibits, manuscripts, rare publications, and military equipment as well as a fine arts gallery. In 2007, several structures of the complex—the palace, rampart, and a royal chapel—were inscribed on the list of Georgia's Immovable Cultural Monuments of National Significance. The entire complex underwent extensive renovation in 2018.

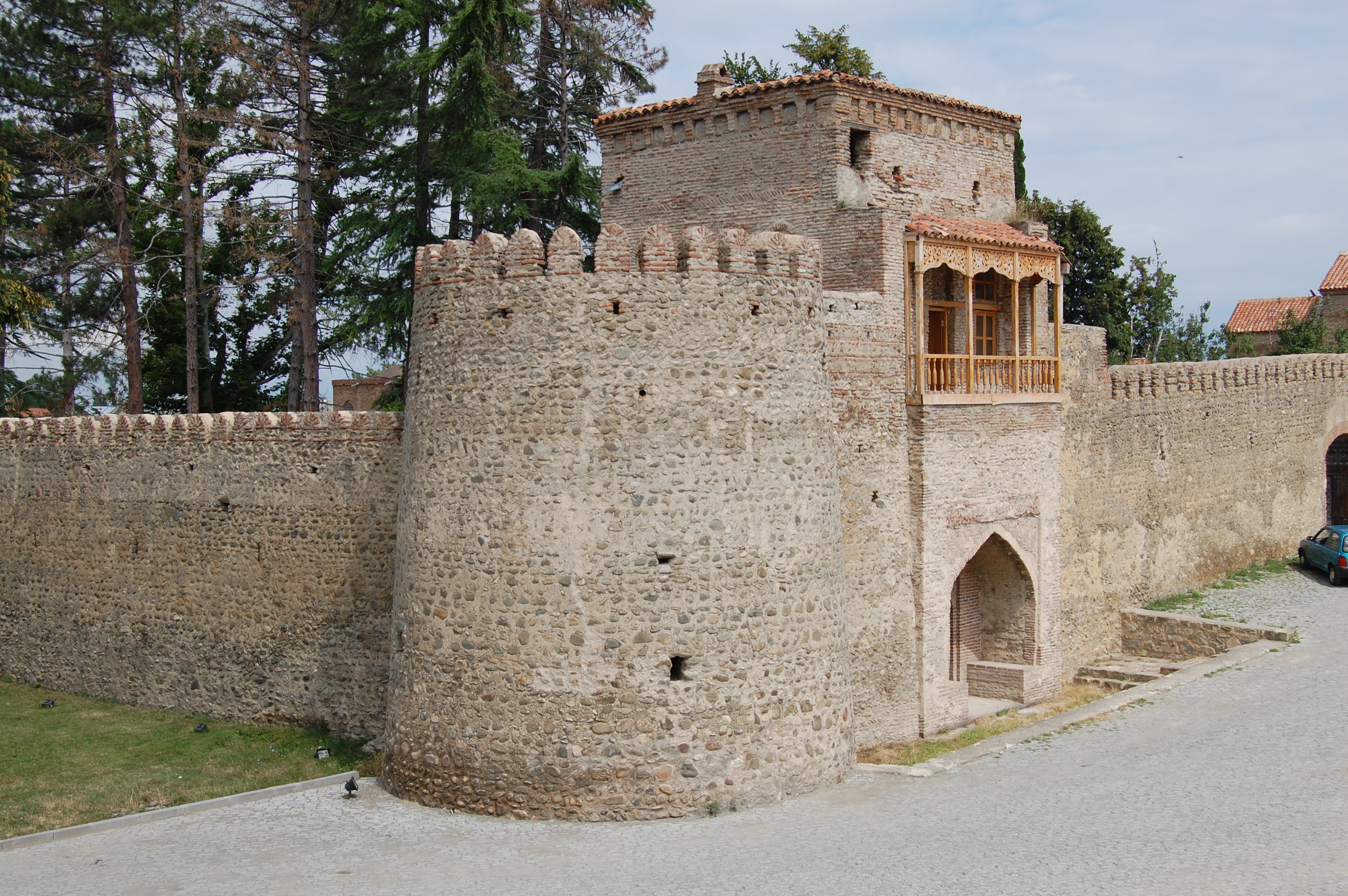
One of the entrances to Batonis Tsikhe

== The royal palace ==
=== Construction and architectural features ===
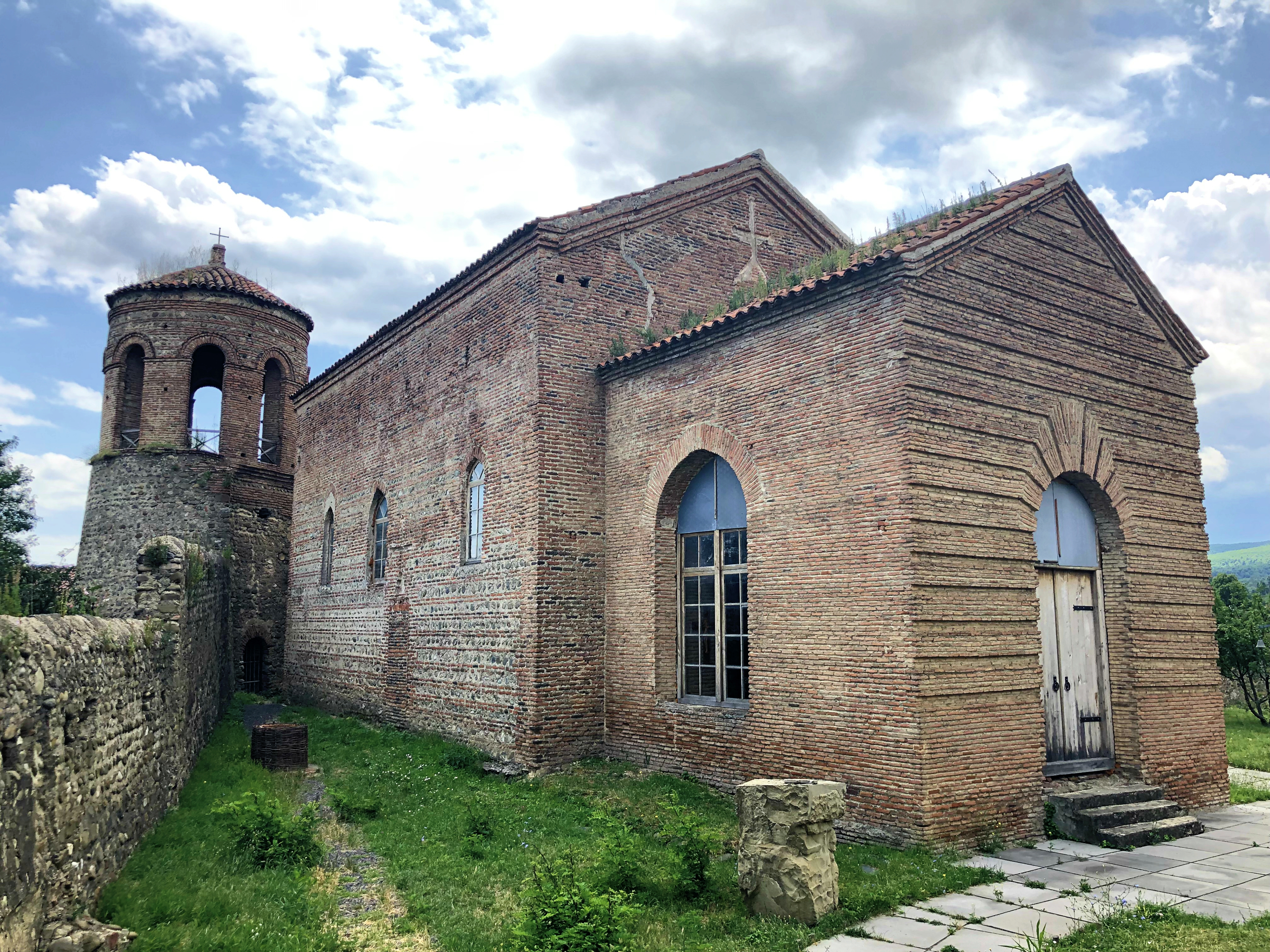
Royal chapels.

Remnants of the former throne room in the Batoni Castle.

The original palace was built at the behest of King Archil of Kakheti sometime between 1664 and 1675. In the political turmoil of the 17th and 18th centuries, the palace was damaged and reconstructed several times. Some sections of the building and ground plan of Archil's palace—reminiscent of the contemporaneous Safavid palaces—remained intact. Much of the extant edifice is the result of reconstruction during the relatively stable reign of Heraclius II as king of Kakheti between 1750 and 1762. It is a simple Persianate design, clearly modeled on the Arg of Karim Khan in Shiraz, Iran.

The entire palace complex, which also includes two royal basilica chapels and bathhouses, are surrounded by a monumental rampart and large circular corner towers. The palace is a rectangular building with a central hall with high ceilings and pointed arches. It has four balconies (ayvān) each facing a cardinal point and flanked by corridors and smaller rooms in the corners. The main entrance to the palace is from the south with the central two-story hall (tālār) with columns. Interior decorations typical for the Persian palaces of that period, such as stucco, mirror mosaics, and oil paintings, were probably present, but have not survived.

=== Later history ===
After the Russian annexation of Georgia in 1801, Major-General Vasily Gulyakov chose the Telavi castle as headquarters for his Kabardian Regiment in 1802. In 1805, the castle was transferred to the Russian Imperial treasury. It was later used by the Russian military as barracks and was mostly in ruins by 1845, when Mikhail Vorontsov, Viceroy of the Caucasus, ordered the palace to be rebuilt. In 1865, the Telavi palace, now in possession of St. Nino's Female Charity Society, was reconstructed by the Georgian-born German architect Albert Salzmann (1833–1897), to accommodate the Women's College of St. Nino. In 1935, the building was adapted to its current function as a home to the Telavi Historical Museum.

The Batonis Tsikhe complex underwent extensive renovation and was reopened for public in May 2018. A new museum was also constructed to house renovated collections. On December 16, 2018, the castle hosted an inauguration ceremony with Salome Zourabichvili, the fifth President of Georgia as a keynote speaker.
