= Old Shuamta =

Monastery

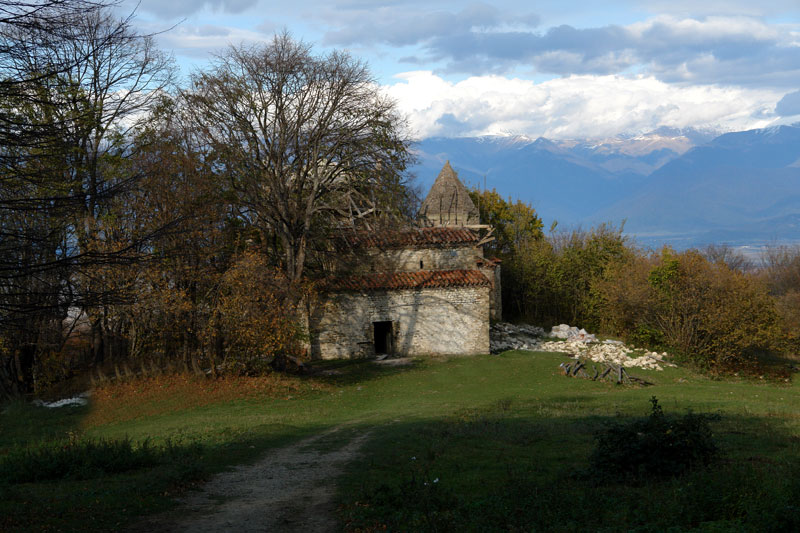
- Dzveli (Old) Shuamta

- Location within Kakheti Location within Georgia

Religion
- Affiliation: Georgian Orthodox Church
- Year consecrated: 5th century

Location
- Location: (Georgia (country)) Telavi, Kakheti, Georgia
- Interactive map of Old Shuamta
- Coordinates: 41°54′38″N 45°24′22″E

Architecture
- Type: Monastery, church, castle
- Style: Georgian

The Old Shuamta (Georgian: ძველი შუამთა) is a Georgian Orthodox monastery in the Kakheti region. It is located on a forested mountain about 1015 m above sea level, and five kilometers west of the town of Telavi, Georgia.

== History ==
Shuamta means "between the mountains", which clearly refers to the isolated and picturesque location amidst the deciduous forests of Gombori of the three buildings of the old Shuamta monastery.

The monastic complex contains a basilica from the 5th century and two domed churches, both from the 7th century. The largest dome-shaped church is similar in type and architecture to the Jvari monastery. All the churches of the monastery are built in carved stone. It was abandoned in the 16th century. The wife of King Lewan II founded a new monastery with the name of New Shuamta. The main church of the new monastery was built of brick. The walls are decorated with frescoes. The monastery buildings were repaired by Erekle II. In 2008, the Old Shuamta monastery was restored.
