= Napareuli, Telavi =

Napareuli ნაფარეული
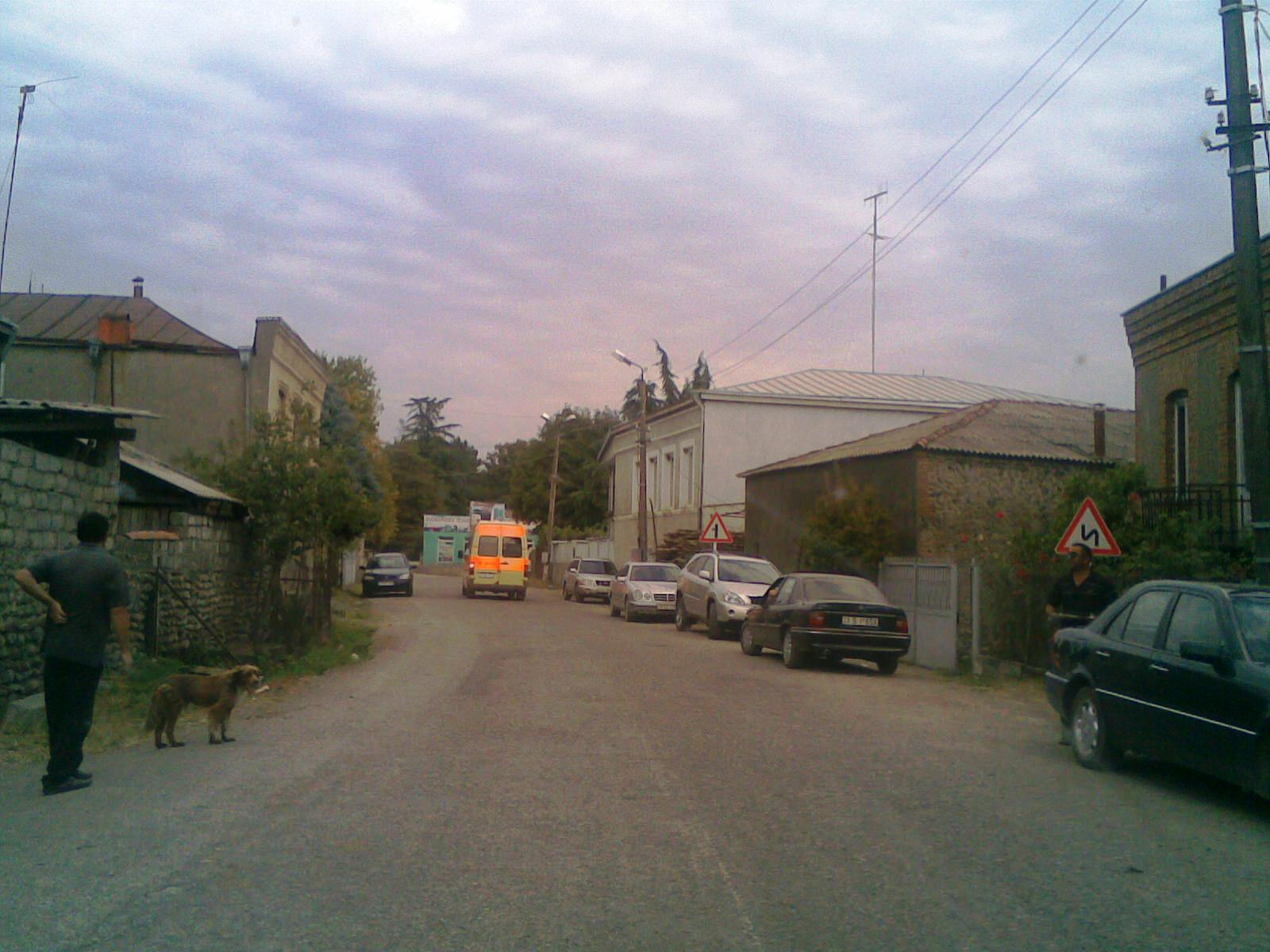
- Village Napareuli

- Location within Georgia
- Coordinates: 42°02′45″N 45°30′11″E
- Country: Georgia
- Region: Kakheti
- Municipality: Telavi
- Elevation: 420 m (1,380 ft)

Population (2014)
  - Total: 2,003
- Time zone: UTC+4 (Georgian Time)

Napareuli (Georgian: ნაფარეული) is a village in Telavi Municipality, Kakheti region, Georgia. It is located 25 km north of Telavi, at an altitude of about 420 m. The population was 2,003 inhabitants in 2014.

Napareuli is known for the appellation wine of the same name. Marble extracted from the local quarry has been used in the Leningrad and Warsaw Metros. There are as many as 8 churches in the village.

== See also ==
- Telavi Municipality
