= Tsinandali =

Tsinandali წინანდალი
- Village
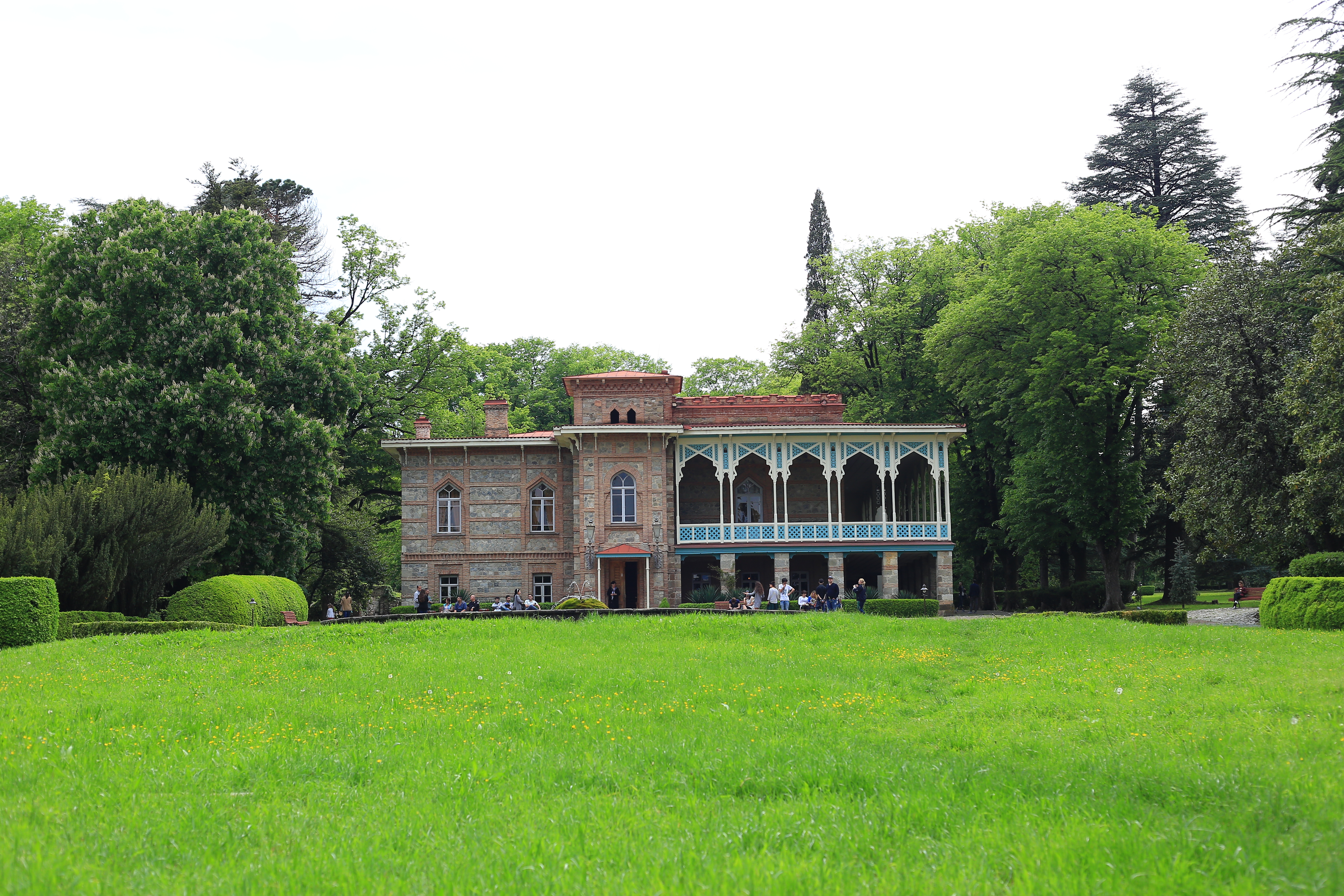
- Tsinandali residence

- Location within Georgia
- Coordinates: 41°53′41″N 45°34′32″E
- Country: Georgia
- Region: Kakheti
- District: Telavi

Population (2014)
  - Total: 2,675
- Time zone: UTC+4 (GET)
- Area code: +995

Tsinandali (Georgian: წინანდალი) is a village in Kakheti, Georgia, situated in the district of Telavi, 79 km east of Tbilisi. It is noted for the palace and historic winery-estate which once belonged to the 19th-century aristocratic poet Alexander Chavchavadze (1786–1846) and which, since 2019, is the venue for the Tsinandali Festival.

== History ==
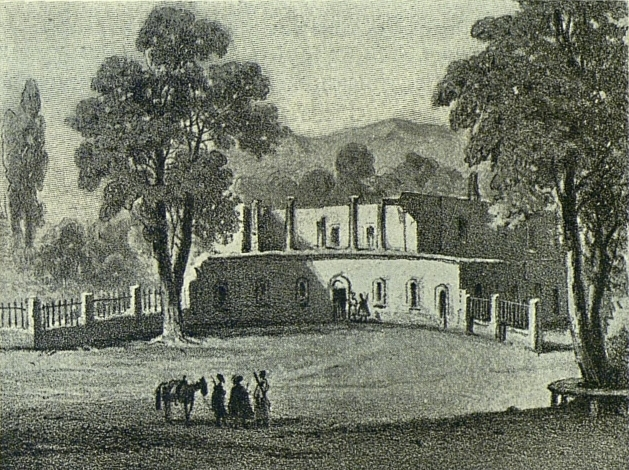
Painting by Vasily Timm depicting plundered Tsinandali after a raid in 1854

Alexander Chavchavadze inherited this village, lying in the Alazani River valley, from his father, Prince Garsevan. He refurbished the estate, constructed a new Italianate palace and built a decorative garden. As scientists claim by 1812 Tsinandali garden had two palaces, one built by Garsevan and another by his son Alexander Chavchavadze. It was the place where prince Alexander Chavchavadze frequently entertained foreign guests with music, wit, and – most especially – the fine vintages made at his estate marani (winery). Familiar with European ways, Chavchavadze built Georgia's oldest and largest winery where he combined European and centuries-long Georgian winemaking traditions. The highly regarded dry white Tsinandali is still produced there.

The village and the Chavchavadze estate were further famed by a surprising raid by the troops of Imam Shamil, a Muslim leader of the North Caucasian opposition to the Russian expansion, on July 2, 1854. The attack was commanded by Ghazi-Muhammad, Shamil's son. Avenging the Chavchavadze family for their contribution to the Russian success in the Caucasian War, the mountaineers pillaged the estate and kidnapped the wife of Alexander's son, Prince David Chavchavadze, her widowed sister, Varvara Orbeliani, who were both granddaughters of George XII of Georgia, their children and several relatives. This event sent waves of shock not only into Russia, but the West as well. On March 22, 1855, after complicated negotiations, the hostages were exchanged for Shamil's captive son Jamal al-Din and 40,000 silver rubles as part of a deal involving a general exchange of prisoners.

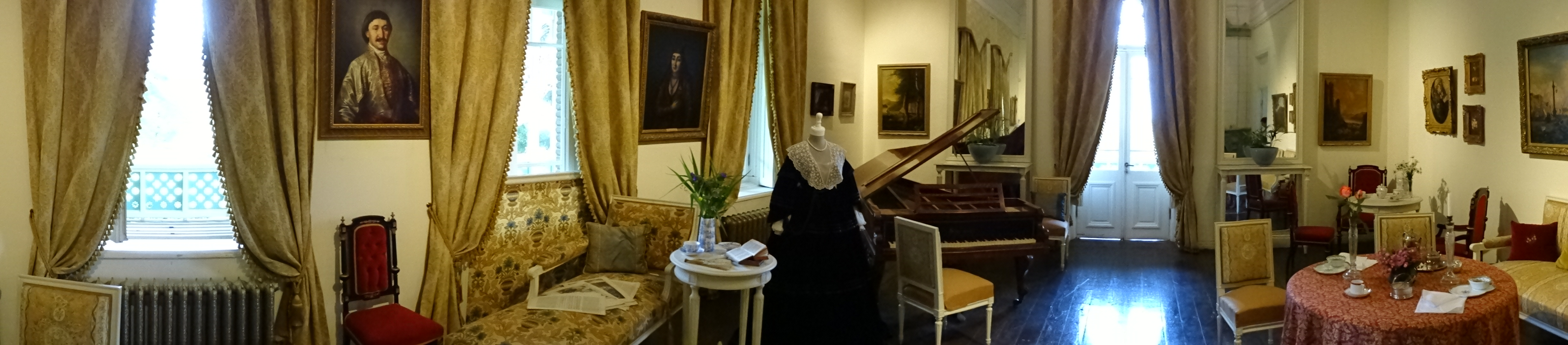
Inside one of the rooms at the Tsinandali house

After David Chavchavadze's death, due to the failure to pay the debt to the Russian Public Bank, the estate passed to the property of the Imperial family. The Tsinandali garden was renovated in 1887 and passed to the state in 1917. In 1947, the estate was organized into a museum. In 2007, a major renovation of the palace and redevelopment of the park was proposed in conjunction with the Smithsonian Institution, and undertaken by the Silk Road Group whose founder is also a force behind the international music festival at the site.

== Sightseeing ==
=== Tsinandali Historic Garden ===
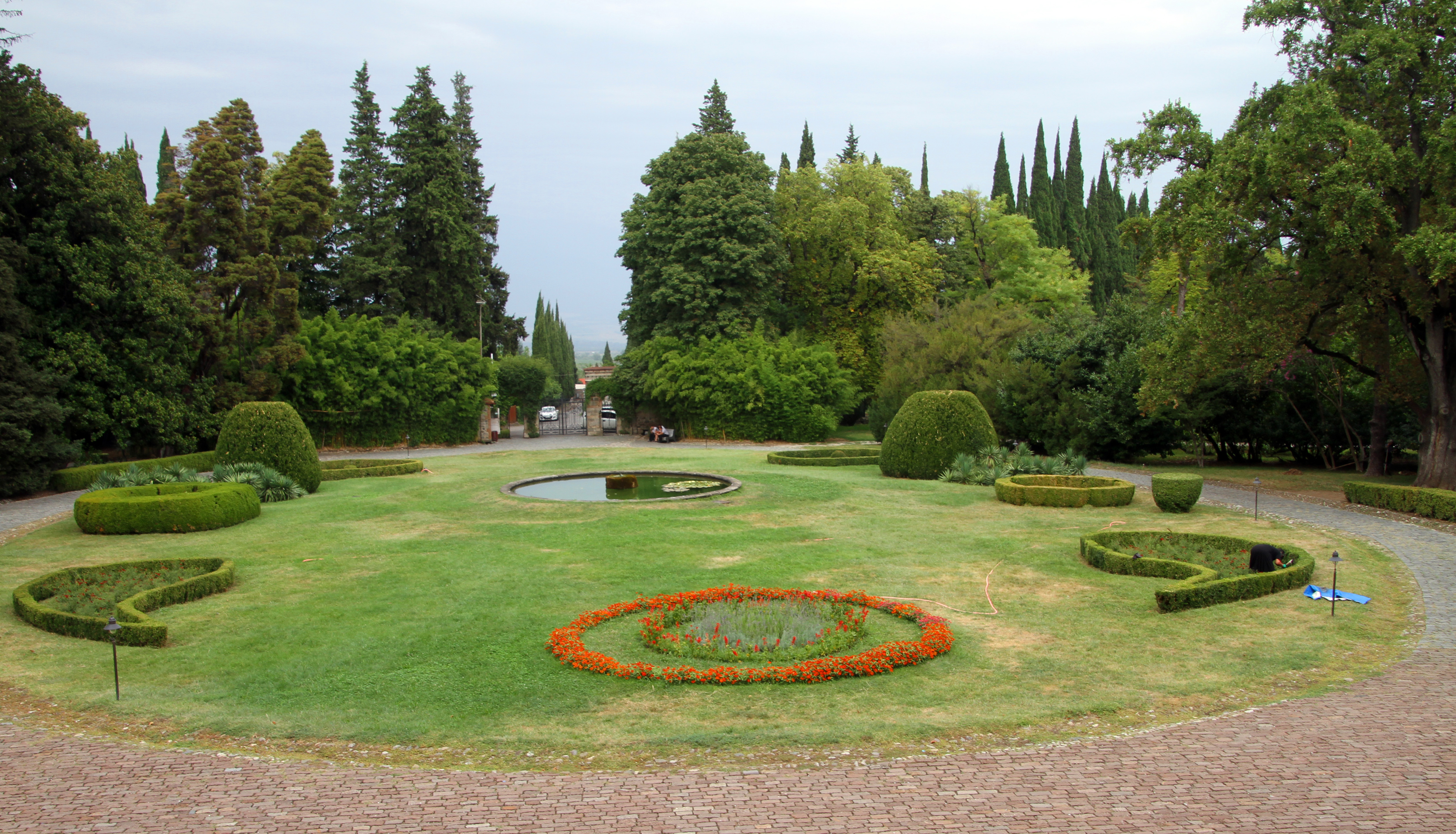
Tsinandali garden

Tsinandali Historic garden takes 12 acres of land today, but it was much bigger during Prince Alexander's time. Alexander Chavchavadze invited European landscape architects and directed a lot of money to build first European style garden in Georgia.

Tsinandali Garden is considered to be one of the few remaining examples of early 19th-century landscape designs, here visitors can see not only local species of trees and shrubs but also species from every continent (Taxus baccata, Ginkgo Biloba, Cryptomeria japonica, Magnolia grandiflora, Maclura Pomifera and so on) and together with garden's unique design patterns. Tsinandali Garden's uniqueness is caused by the organic merge of European symmetric and Georgian natural patterns. It mostly reminds its viewers of English gardens from 19th century. Some compare Tsinandali to Richmond and Kew Gardens.

In 2019, Tsinandali Garden became the member of European Network of Historic Gardens and was included into the historic gardens' touristic routes.

=== Tsinandali Old Winery ===
Prince Alexander Chavchavadze built wine cellar and wine factory in his estate in 1830s. He also started collecting wine collection and today Tsinandali Oenotheque counts over 16 500 historic bottles of wine starting from 1814 till today. Among them should be distinguished Polish Honey (1814) Château d'Yquem (1861) and first Georgian bottled wine of 1841, Saperavi (This is the oldest bottled wine in Georgia) 19th-century wine cellar is unique with its engineering, that allows to keep constant temperature and humidity in the chambers that are best for wine keeping. In the 19th century a fashionable salon was located in Tsinandali estate, where aristocrats from different countries gathered lived a stormy life. Alexander Dumas once compared Tsinandali to a paradise. In 1888 Tsinandali Wine cellar together with other heritage transferred to Romanov imperial family. and winery was renovated by the architect Alexander Ozerov. Today Tsinandali Wine Cellar still hosts a big wine collection as well as providing venues for conferences and classical music concerts. Since 2019, it hosts the Tsinandali Classical music festival.

== Napareuli Chavchavadze Estate ==
In 1797, King Erekle granted to Garsevan Chavchavadze, a well-known statesman, estates in the village Napareuli as well as the Tsinandali estate. Napareuli is located in Khaketi, approximately 10 minutes drive from Tsinandali. After his death, his son, Aleksandre Chavchavadze, took care of these estates and became particularly skilled at managing the vineyards and developed special wine production techniques. Aleksandre carried out several reforms that were helpful to improve the quality of the vineyards as well as wines. The estate in Napareuli is still visible today, located near the Twins Wine House, although the original estate buildings remain in a derelict state.

== See also ==
- Telavi Municipality
- Alexander Chavchavadze
