= Alazani =

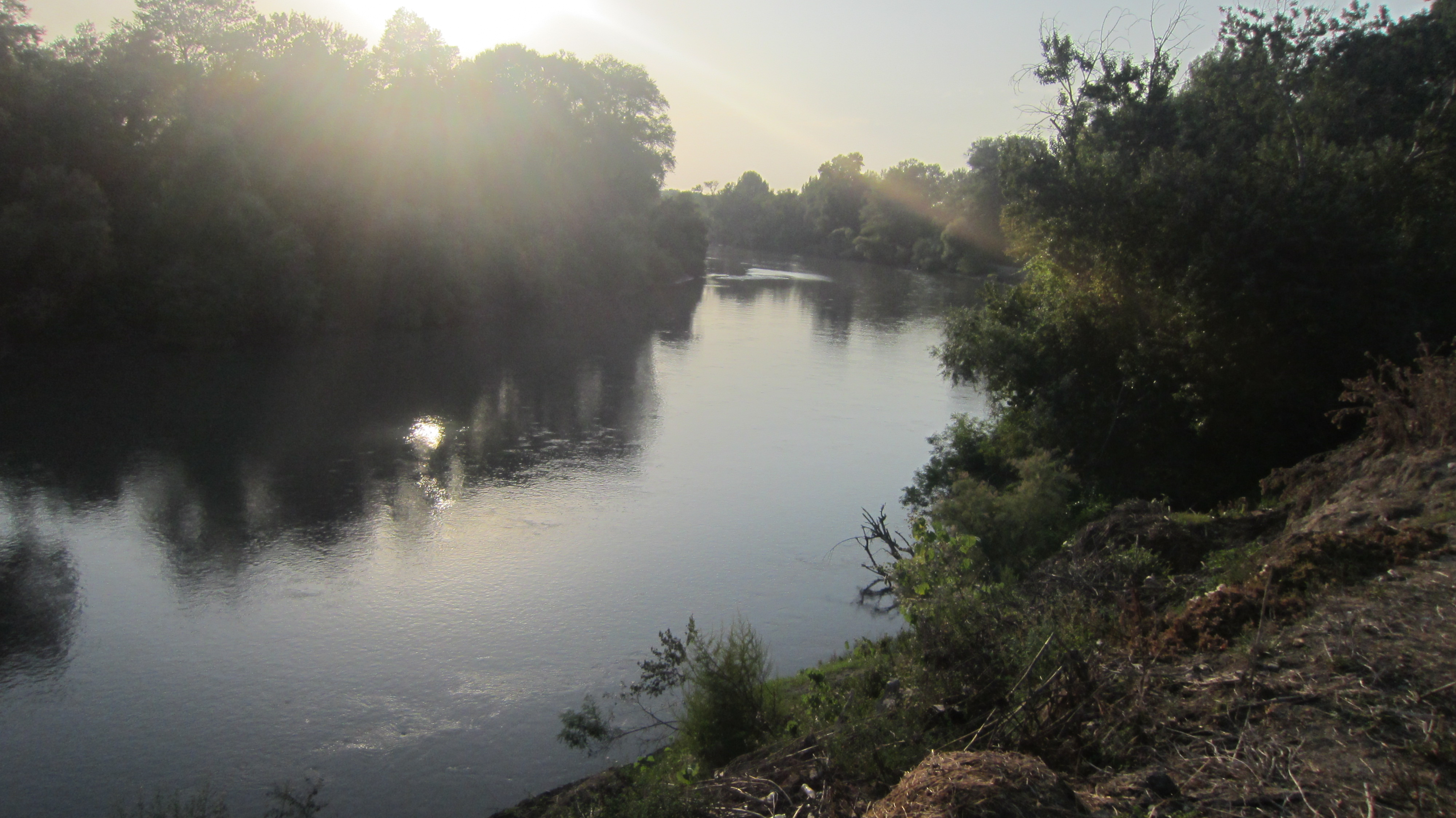
- Alazani River near Qakh

Location
- Countries: Georgia and Azerbaijan

Physical characteristics
- Source: The Greater Caucasus Range
  - location: Kakheti, Georgia
  - coordinates: 42°25′41″N 45°13′34″E
  - elevation: 2,995 m (9,826 ft)
- Mouth: Kura
  - location: Mingəçevir, Azerbaijan
  - coordinates: 41.0159°N 46.6546°E
  - elevation: 78 m (256 ft)
- Length: 391 km (243 mi)
- Basin size: 11,455 km^{2} (4,423 sq mi)

Basin features
- Progression: Kura→ Caspian Sea
- Tributaries
  - left: Lopota

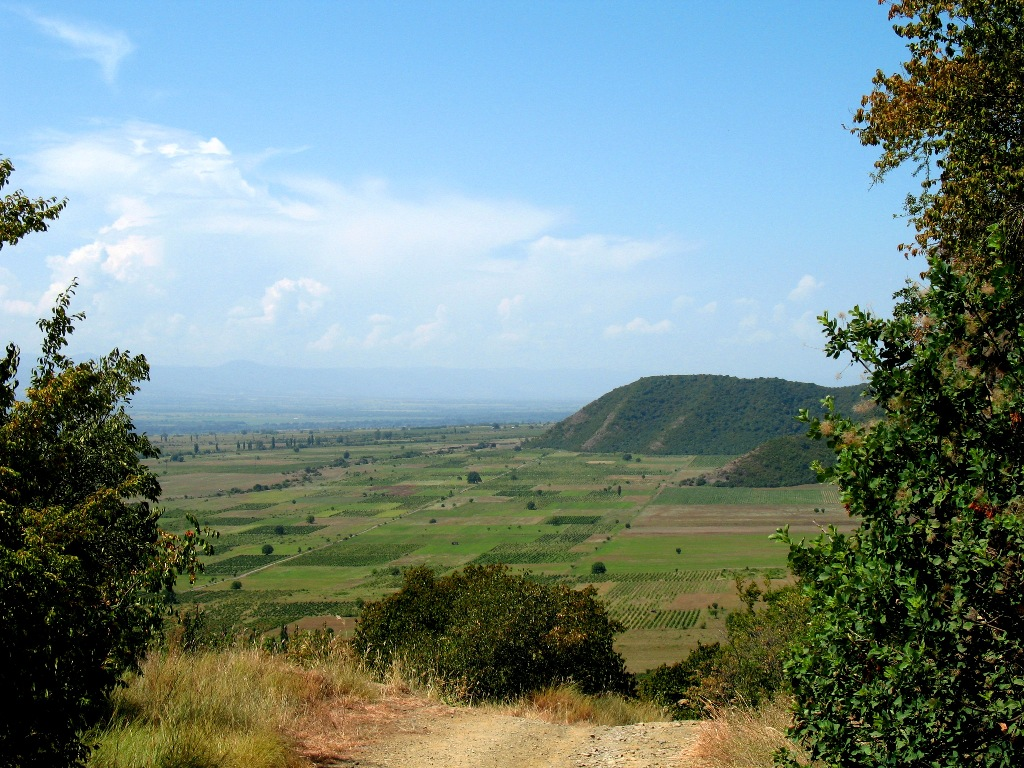
Alazani Valley

The Alazani (Note: Georgian: ალაზანი [aɫazani]; Azerbaijani: Qanıxçay [gɑnɯχˈtʃɑj] or Alazan çayı) (/ˌæləˈzɑːni/ AL-ə-ZAHN-ee) is a river that flows through the Caucasus. It is the main tributary of the Kura in eastern Georgia, and flows for 351 kilometres (218 mi). Part of its path forms the border between Georgia and Azerbaijan, before it meets the Kura at the Mingəçevir Reservoir in Azerbaijan. The river is likely the same as that referred to by classical authors Strabo and Pliny as "Alazonius" or "Alazon", and may also be the Abas River mentioned by Plutarch (Plut. Pomp. 35) and Dio Cassius (37.3) as the location of the Battle of the Abas (65 BCE).

== Origin and route ==
The Alazani originates in Upper Kakheti at the edge of the Greater Caucasus, south of the main ridge, in the northwestern part of the Akhmeta District. It flows initially to the south towards the town of Akhmeta in Upper Kakheti, then southeast through the fertile Alazani Valley of Lower Kakheti until the Azerbaijani border where it forms the border, and crosses the Azerbaijani border into its mouth in the Mingəçevir Reservoir.

== Usage ==
The Alazani valley, which is the center of the Georgian wine industry, dries up during the winter and remains so until snow melts in the spring and water flows from the mountains swell the river enormously; this regularly causes flooding. The river is mainly used for irrigation and for drinking water. In the 1990s, Chinese investors built many small hydroelectric power plants, which use the Alazani's strong current. The river is also popular with tourists for rafting trips.

Light pollution of the river with biological substances comes from untreated sewage from the cities and other communities on its banks, as well as from the agricultural runoffs. In the districts of Kvareli and Lagodekhi, water quality is said to be quite bad.

Alazani serves also as the name of different Georgian wines, among them the semi-dry brands of Marani Alazani Valley and Old Tbilisi Alazani.

== See also ==
- Alazani Floodplain Forests Natural Monument
