= Ikalto =

Ikalto may refer to:

- Ikalto Monastery
- Academy of Ikalto
- Ikalto, Georgia
