= October 25 (Eastern Orthodox liturgics) =

Day in the Eastern Orthodox liturgical calendar

Eastern Orthodox liturgical calendar
October 24	October 25	October 26
October 25 O.S. ≍ November 7 N.S. October 25 N.S ≍ October 12 O.S.

An Eastern Orthodox cross

October 25 in Eastern Orthodox liturgical calendars is a feast day and a day of commemoration of saints and martyrs. Although some Orthodox churches use the Revised Julian Calendar and others use the traditional Julian calendar, the fixed commemorations for their respective October 25 are broadly the same, no matter which calendar is used. (Note: Despite the dates being the same, the days to which they refer typically differ by 13 days. The notation Old Style or O.S. is sometimes used to indicate a date in the traditional Julian Calendar (the "Old Calendar"). The notation New Style or N.S. indicates a date in the Revised Julian calendar (the "New Calendar").)

== Saints ==
- Saint Tabitha the Alsmgiver, the widow resurrected by the Apostle Peter (Acts 9:36-43) (1st century) (Note: Also commemorated on the 4th Sunday of Pascha.)
- Martyrs Pappias, Diodorus and Claudianus, of Attaleia in Pamphylia, by beheading (c. 249-251) (see also: February 3)
- Martyr Anastasius the Fuller, at Salona in Dalmatia (3rd century) (see also: December 5)
- Martyr Valerinus, by the sword.
- Martyrs Valerius and Chrysaphos, by the sword.
- Martyr Sabinus, by fire.
- Martyrs Faustus, Basil and Lucianus, of Darion in Constantinople, by the sword. (see also: February 6)
- Martyrs Nicephorus and Stephen, by flogging. (see also: February 8)
- Saints Philadelphus and Polycarp. (see also: February 8)
- Two martyrs of Thrace, crushed between two large rocks.
- Martyrs Marcian and Martyrius the Notaries, of Constantinople (355) (Note: "At Constantinople, the martyrdom of the Saints Martyrius, sub-deacon, and Marcian, chanter, who were murdered by the heretics, under the emperor Constantius.")
- Saint George, Bishop of Amastrida and canon-writer (c. 805)

== Pre-Schism Western saints ==
- Saints Front and George, Bishops and Apostles of Périgueux, in France (2nd century) (Note: "At Perigueux, in France, St. Fronto, who, being made bishop by the blessed Apostle Peter, converted to Christ, with a priest named George, a large number of the people of that place, and, renowned for miracles, rested in peace.") (Note: See: (in French) Front de Périgueux. Wikipédia. (French Wikipedia).)
- Martyr Miniatus of Florence (Minias), venerated as the first Christian martyr of Florence (251) (Note: A soldier in Florence in Italy, where he spread the Faith among his comrades and was martyred under Decius. A monastery in Florence was dedicated to him.) (Note: "At Florence, St. Minias, a soldier, who fought valorously for the faith of Christ and was gloriously crowned with martyrdom during the reign of Decius.")
- Martyrs of Rome, including soldier-martyrs Theodosius, Lucius, Mark and Peter, under Claudius II (269) (Note: "Also, at Rome, the birthday of forty-six holy soldiers, who were baptized together by pope Denis, and soon after beheaded by order of the emperor Claudius. They were buried on the Salarian way, with one hundred and twenty-one other martyrs. Among them are named four soldiers of Christ Theodosius, Lucius, Mark and Peter.")
- Saints Crispinus and Crispinianus, brothers, missionaries, martyred under Diocletian at Soissons (289) (Note: "At Soissons, in France, in the persecution of Diocletian, the holy martyrs Crispin and Crispinian, noble Romans. Under the governor Rictiovarus, after horrible torments, they were put to the sword, and thus obtained the crown of martyrdom. Their bodies were afterwards conveyed to Rome, and entombed with due honors in the church of St. Lawrence, in Panisperna.")
- Saint Cyrinus (Quirinus), a martyr in Rome under Diocletian (3rd century)
- Martyrs Protus and Januarius, beheaded in Porto Torres, Sardinia, Italy (303) (Note: "At Torres, in Sardinia, the holy martyrs Protus, priest, and Januarius, deacon, who, being sent to that island by pope St. Caius, were put to death, under the governor Barbarus, in the reign of Diocletian.")
- Saint Gaudentius of Brescia, Bishop of Brescia, a theologian and author of many letters and sermons (410) (Note: Born in Brescia in Italy, he became a monk in Caesarea in Cappadocia. He was recalled to Brescia to succeed St Philastrius as bishop and was consecrated by St Ambrose (c 387). In 405 he was sent to defend St John Chrysostom and was imprisoned near Thrace. He reposed shortly afterwards.) (Note: "At Brescia, the birthday of St. Gaudentius, bishop, distinguished by his learning and holiness.")
- Saint Lupus of Bayeux, Bishop of Bayeux (5th century)
- Saint Hilary of Mende (Hilarius), Bishop of Mende (535) (Note: Born in Mende in the south of France, he received baptism, became a hermit on the banks of the Tarn, a monk at Lérins Abbey, and finally Bishop of Mende.) (Note: "At Javols, St. Hilary, bishop.")
- Saint Dulcardus, a monk at Micy Abbey (Saint-Mesmin) in Orleans in France, then a hermit near Bourges, where the village of Saint-Doulchard still exists (584)
- Saint Hildemarca, a nun at the convent of St Eulalia in Bordeaux, who became Abbess of Fécamp Abbey in the north of France (c. 670)
- Saint Goeznoveus, Bishop of Léon in Brittany (675) (Note: Brother of St Maughan, he left Cornwall for Brittany and became Bishop of Léon.) (Note: See: (in French) Saint Goueznou. Wikipédia. (French Wikipedia).)
- Saints Fructus (Frutos), Valentine and Engratia, two brothers and a sister who lived in Sépulveda in Castile in Spain (715) (Note: Valentine and Engratia were martyred by the Moors, but Frutos escaped and reposed as a hermit. They are venerated as the patron-saints of Segovia, where their relics are enshrined.)

== Post-Schism Orthodox saints ==
- Saint Martyrius, deacon, (Note: See: (in Russian) Мартирий Печерский. Википе́дия. (Russian Wikipedia).) and Saint Martyrius, recluse, of the Kiev Caves (13th-14th centuries)
- Venerable Macarius, Bishop of Paphos on Cyprus (1688) (see also: February 8)

=== New Martys and Confessors ===
- Saint Matrona (Vlasova) the Confessor, of Diveyevo Convent (1963)

== Icon gallery ==
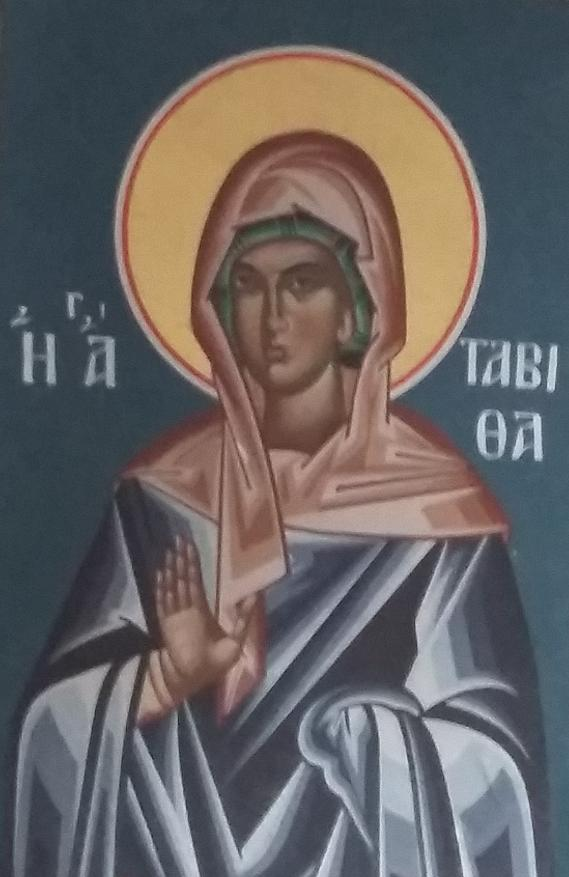
St. Tabitha the Alsmgiver.

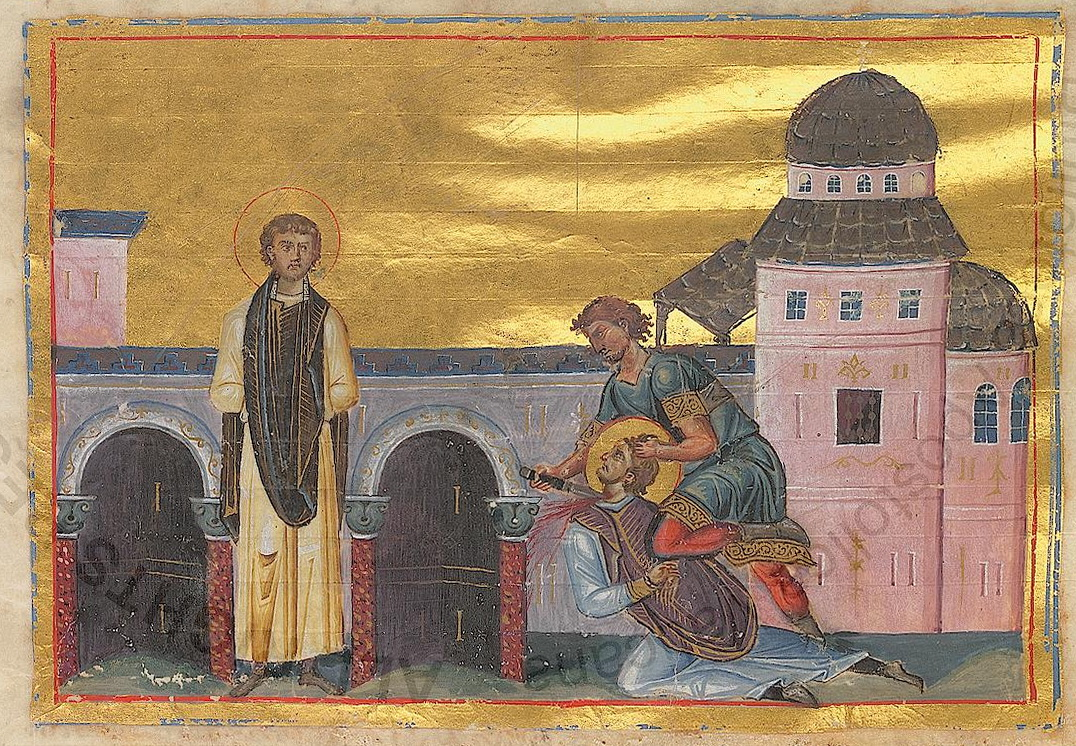
Martyrs Marcian and Martyrius the Notaries, of Constantinople.
(Menologion of Basil II, 10th century).

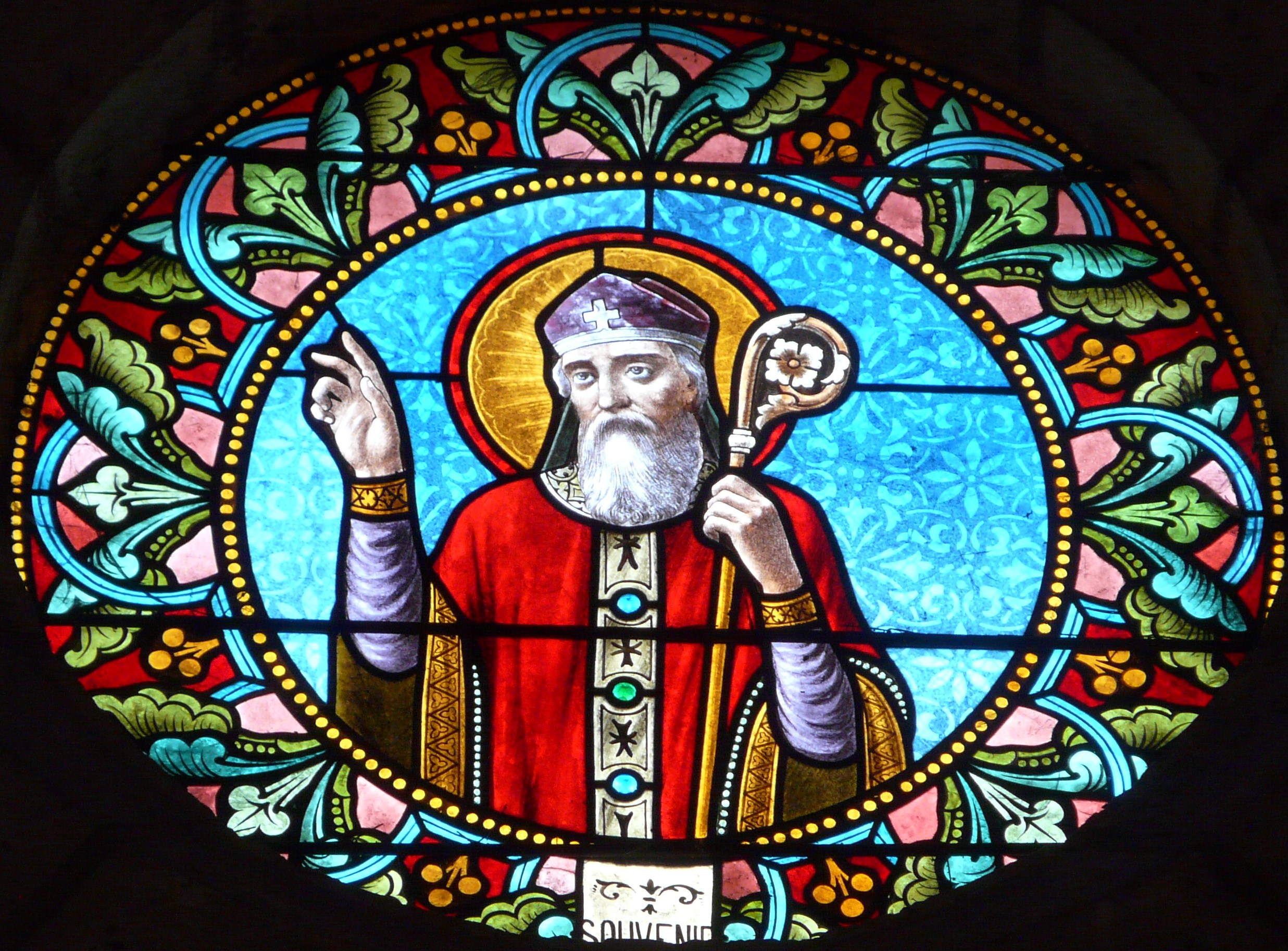
St. Front, Bishop of Perigueux.

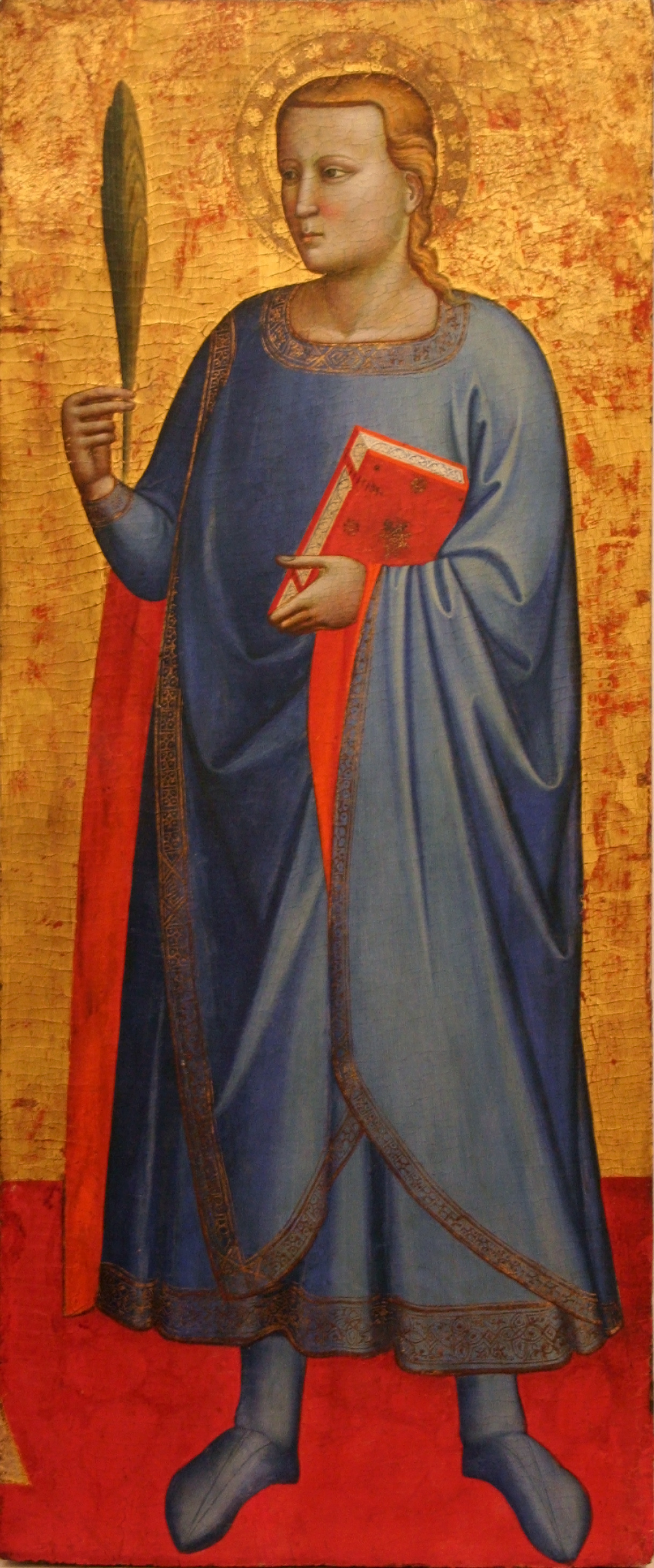
St. Miniatus of Florence.

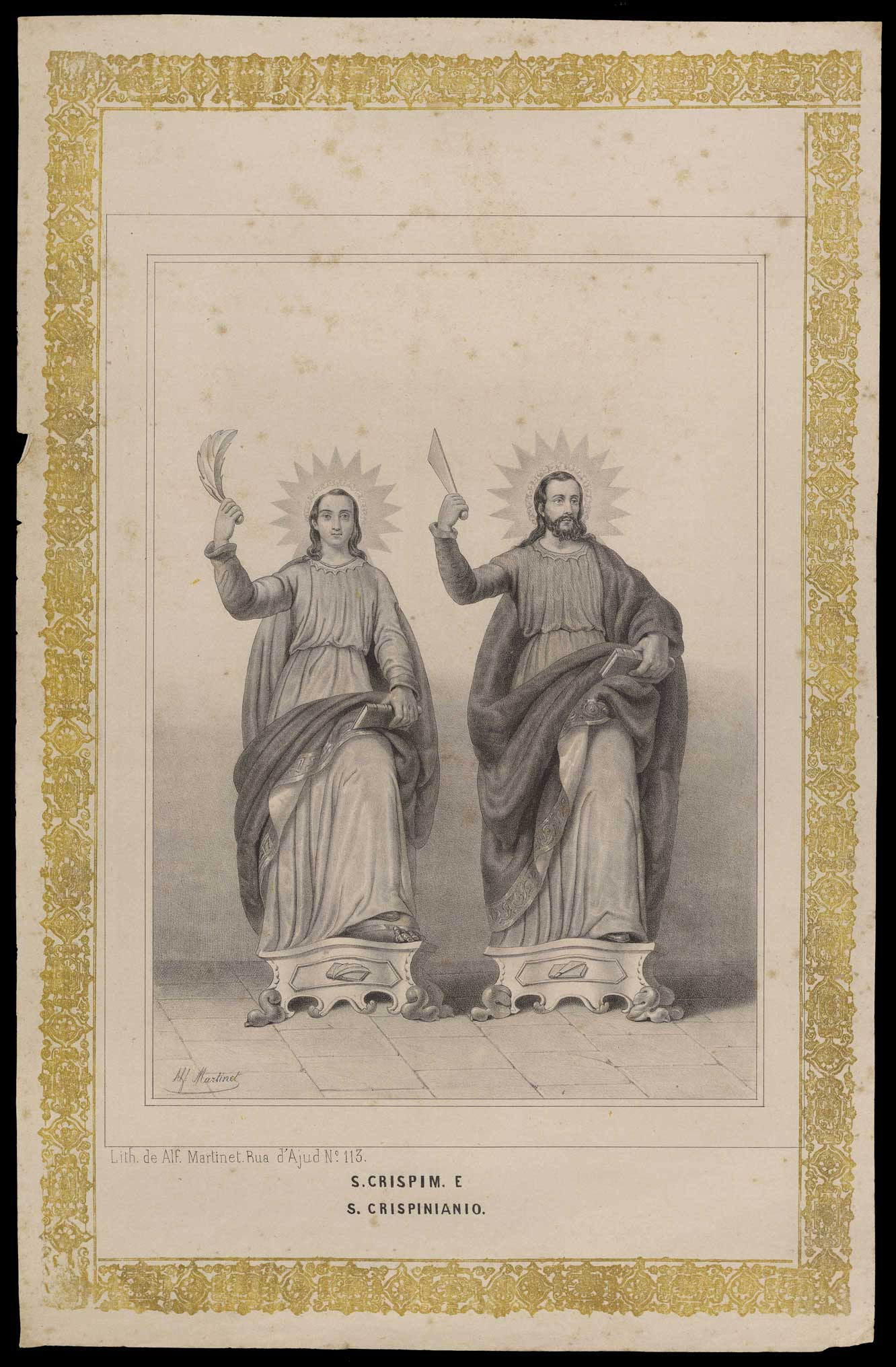
Sts. Crispinus and Crispinianus.

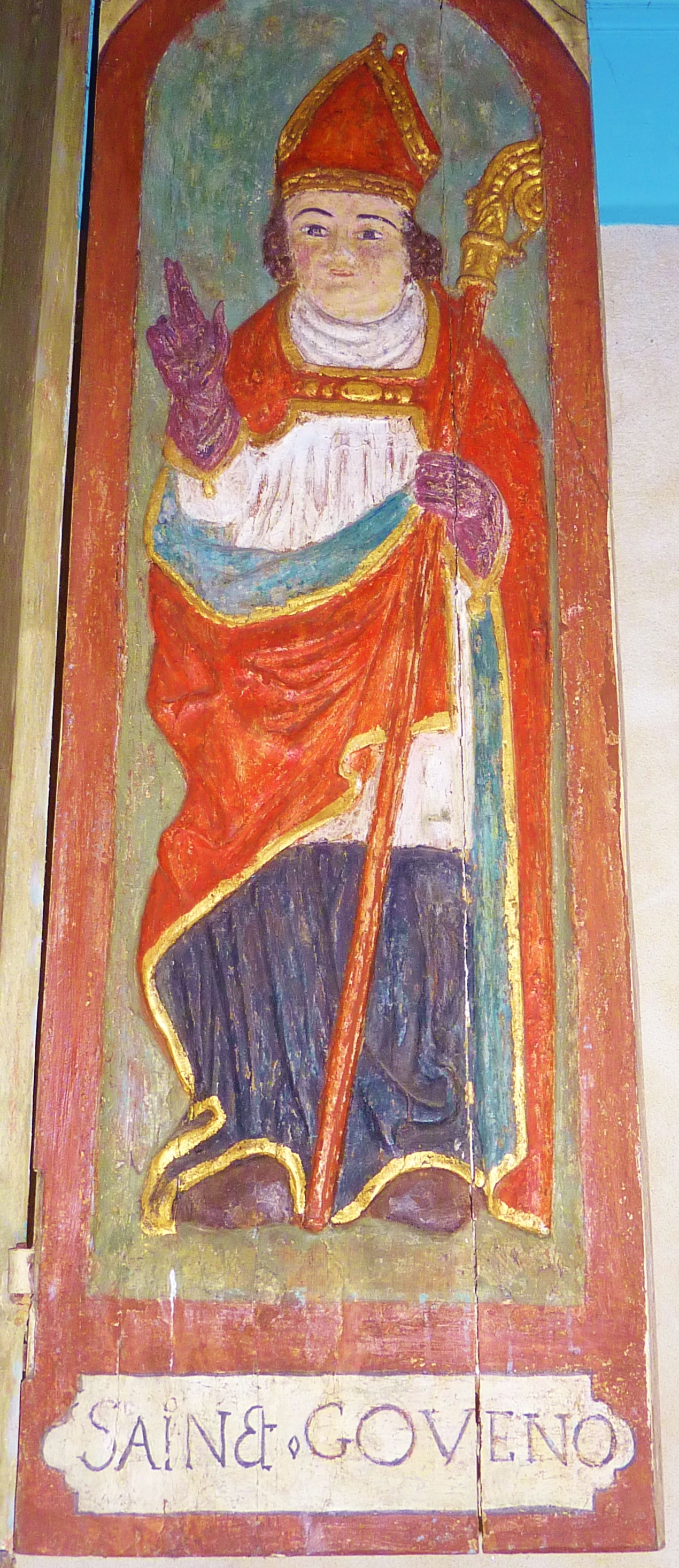
St. Goeznoveus, Bishop of Léon.

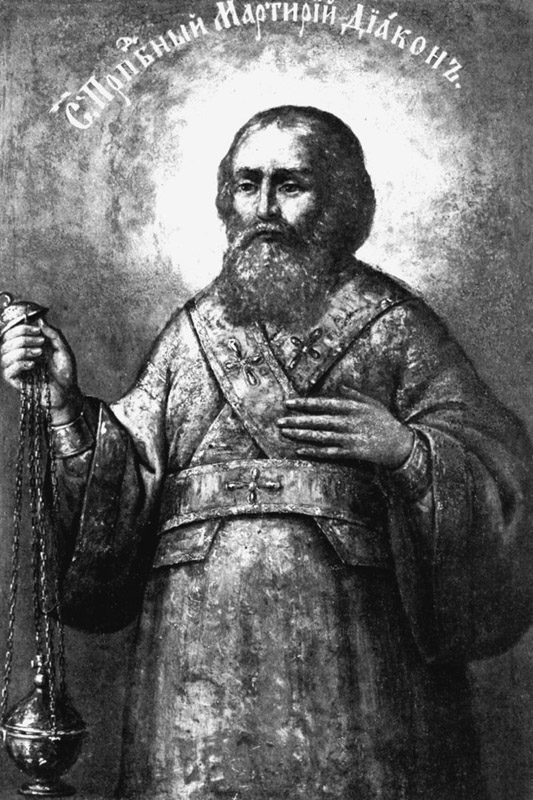
Saint Martyrius, deacon, of the Kiev Caves.

St. Matrona (Vlasova) the Confessor, of Diveyevo Convent.

== Sources ==
- October 25 / November 7. Orthodox Calendar (PRAVOSLAVIE.RU).
- November 7 / October 25. HOLY TRINITY RUSSIAN ORTHODOX CHURCH (A parish of the Patriarchate of Moscow).
- October 25. OCA - The Lives of the Saints.
- The Autonomous Orthodox Metropolia of Western Europe and the Americas (ROCOR). St. Hilarion Calendar of Saints for the year of our Lord 2004. St. Hilarion Press (Austin, TX). pp. 79–80.
- The Twenty-Fifth Day of the Month of October. Orthodoxy in China.
- October 25. Latin Saints of the Orthodox Patriarchate of Rome.
- The Roman Martyrology. Transl. by the Archbishop of Baltimore. Last Edition, According to the Copy Printed at Rome in 1914. Revised Edition, with the Imprimatur of His Eminence Cardinal Gibbons. Baltimore: John Murphy Company, 1916. pp. 329–330.
- Rev. Richard Stanton. A Menology of England and Wales, or, Brief Memorials of the Ancient British and English Saints Arranged According to the Calendar, Together with the Martyrs of the 16th and 17th Centuries. London: Burns & Oates, 1892. p. 514.

Greek Sources

- Great Synaxaristes: (in Greek) 25 ΟΚΤΩΒΡΙΟΥ. ΜΕΓΑΣ ΣΥΝΑΞΑΡΙΣΤΗΣ.
- (in Greek) Συναξαριστής. 25 Οκτωβρίου. ECCLESIA.GR. (H ΕΚΚΛΗΣΙΑ ΤΗΣ ΕΛΛΑΔΟΣ).
- (in Greek) 25/10/2017. Ορθόδοξος Συναξαριστής.

Russian Sources

- (in Russian) 7 ноября (25 октября). Православная Энциклопедия под редакцией Патриарха Московского и всея Руси Кирилла (электронная версия). (Orthodox Encyclopedia - Pravenc.ru).
- (in Russian) 25 октября по старому стилю / 7 ноября по новому стилю. Русская Православная Церковь - Православный церковный календарь на 2016 год.
