= Ikalto Monastery =

Georgian monastery

Coordinates: 41.937°N 45.381°E

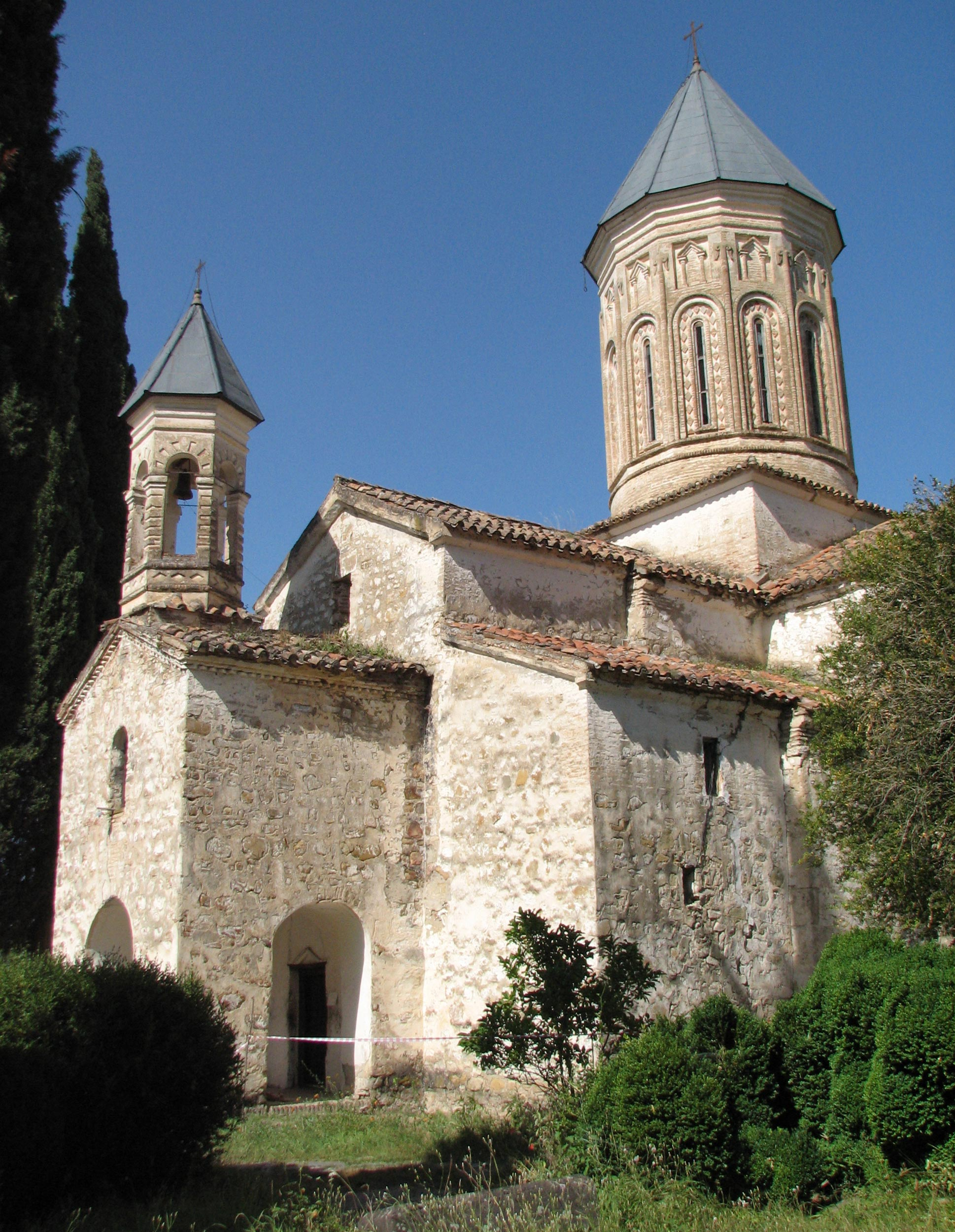
Khvtaeba church at the Ikalto monastery.

Iqalto (Georgian: იყალთო) is a village about 10 km west of the town Telavi in the Kakheti region of Eastern Georgia. It is mostly known for its monastery complex and the Ikalto Academy.

The Ikalto monastery was founded by Saint Zenon, one of the 13 Assyrian Fathers, in the late 6th century. It was known as one of the most significant cultural-scholastic centres of Georgia. An academy was founded at the monastery during king David the Builder by Arsen Ikaltoeli (Ikaltoeli meaning from Ikalto), and advisor to David IV, in 1106. The Academy of Ikalto trained its students in theology, rhetoric, astronomy, philosophy, geography, geometry, arithmetic, music, grammar, chanting but also more practical skills such as pottery making, metal work, viticulture and wine making and pharmacology. According to a legend the famous 12th century Georgian poet Shota Rustaveli studied there.

There are three churches on the monastery grounds – Khvtaeba, Kvelatsminda and Sameba. The main church, Khvtaeba (Holy Spirit), was built in the 8th–9th century on the site of an older church (in which Saint Zenon had been buried). In 1616 the Persian invaders led by Shah Abbas I set the Ikalto Academy on fire and it ceased to exist.

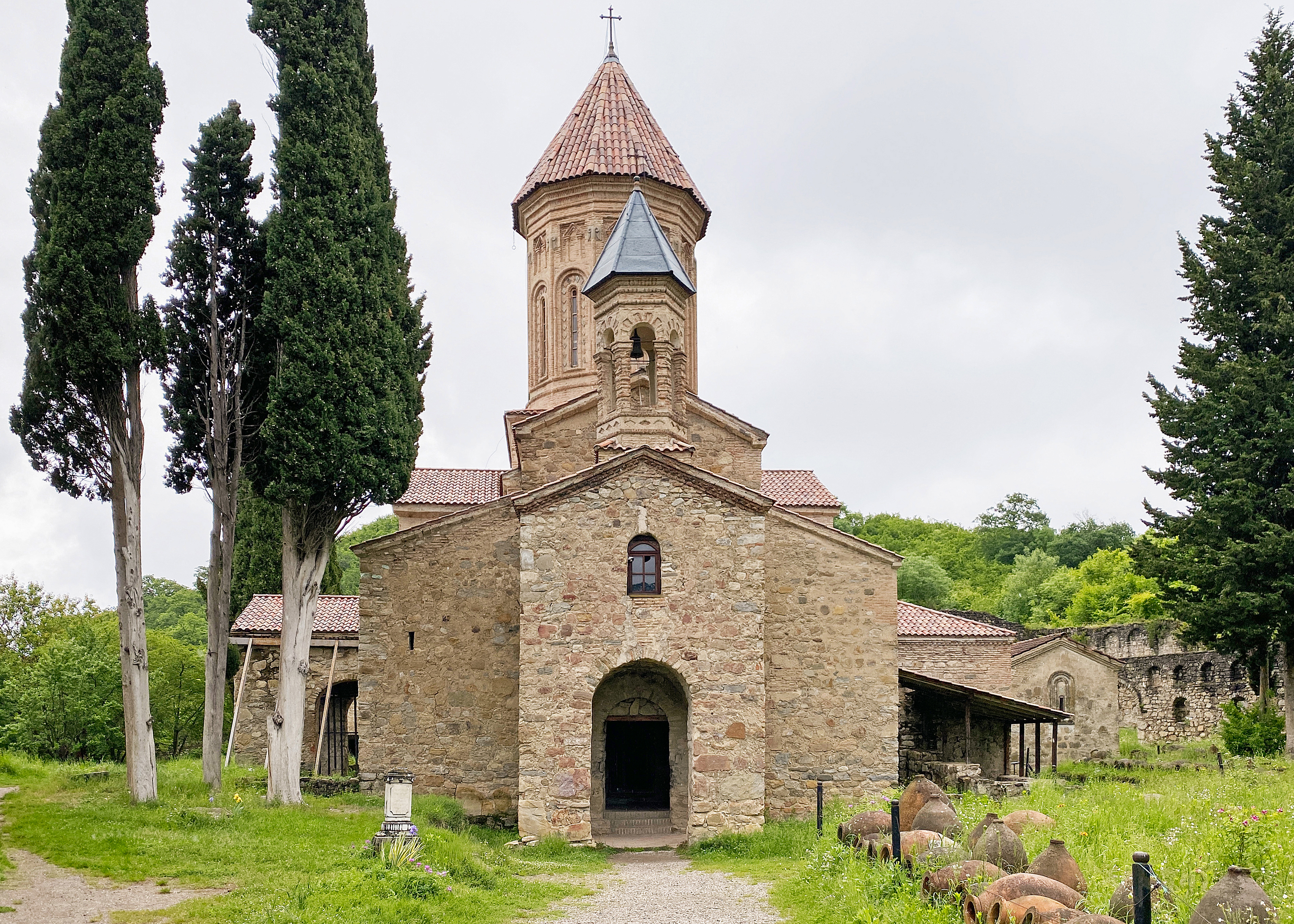
Church of the Transfiguration

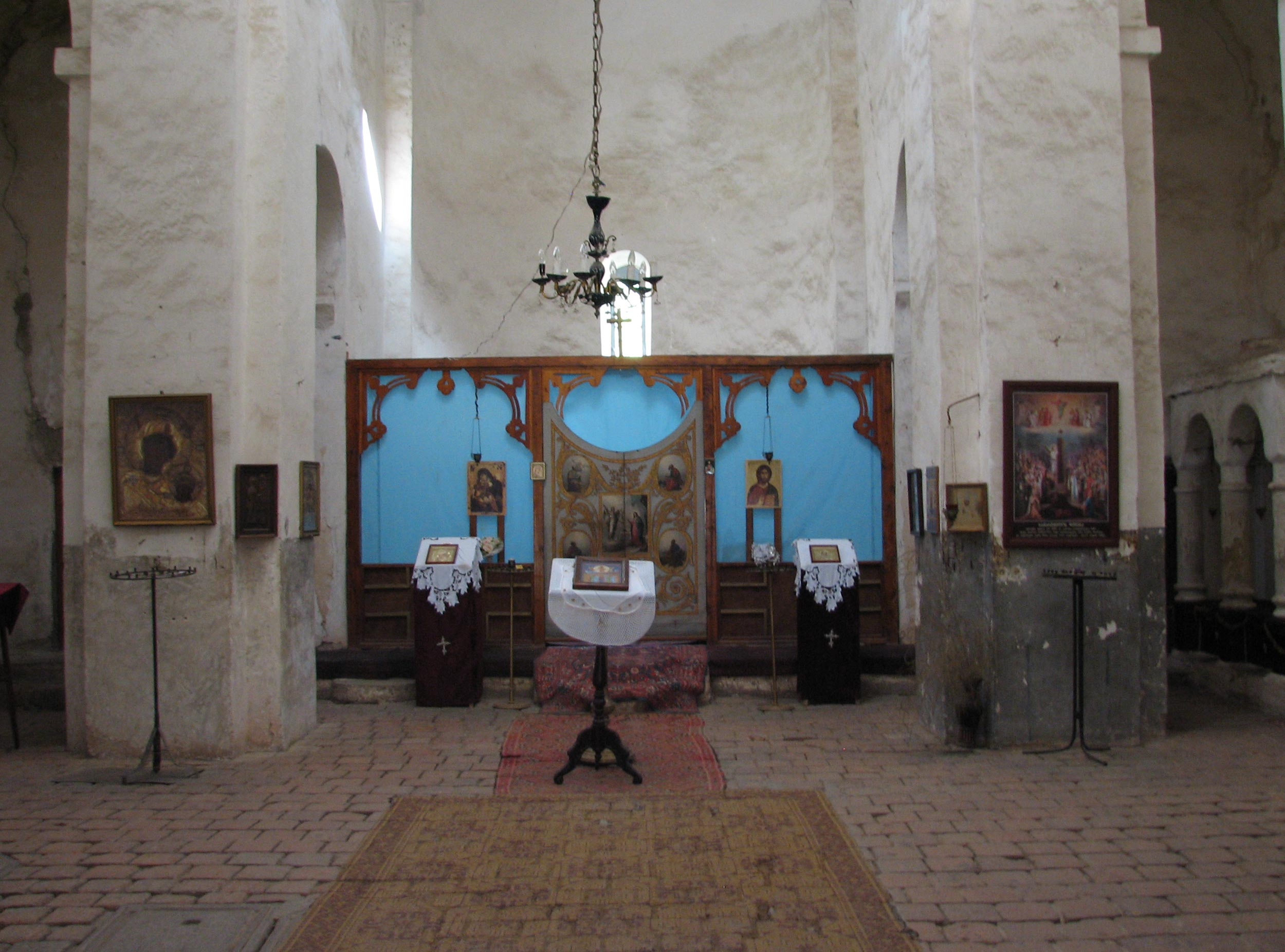
Church of the Transfiguration

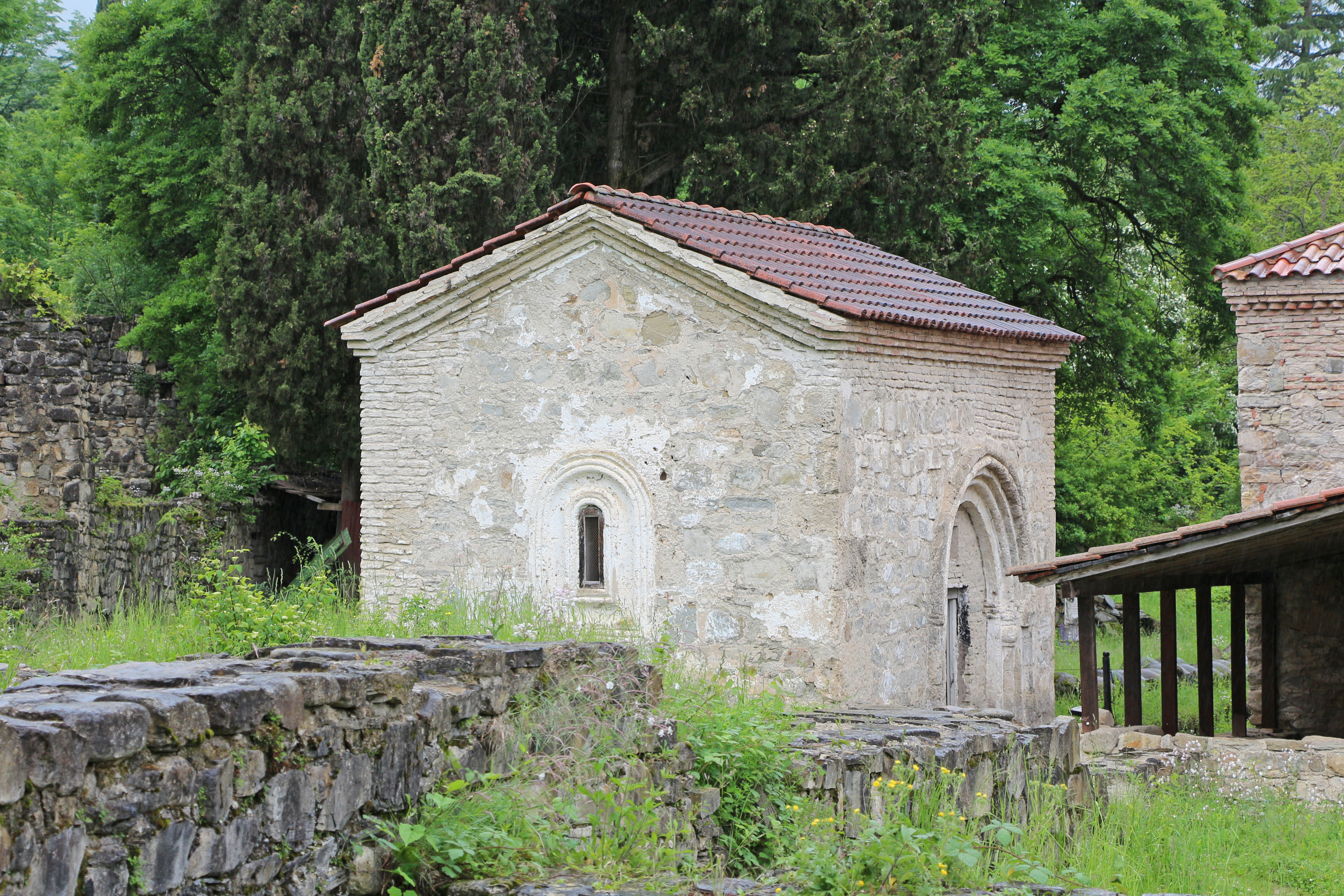
Chapel of the Mother of God

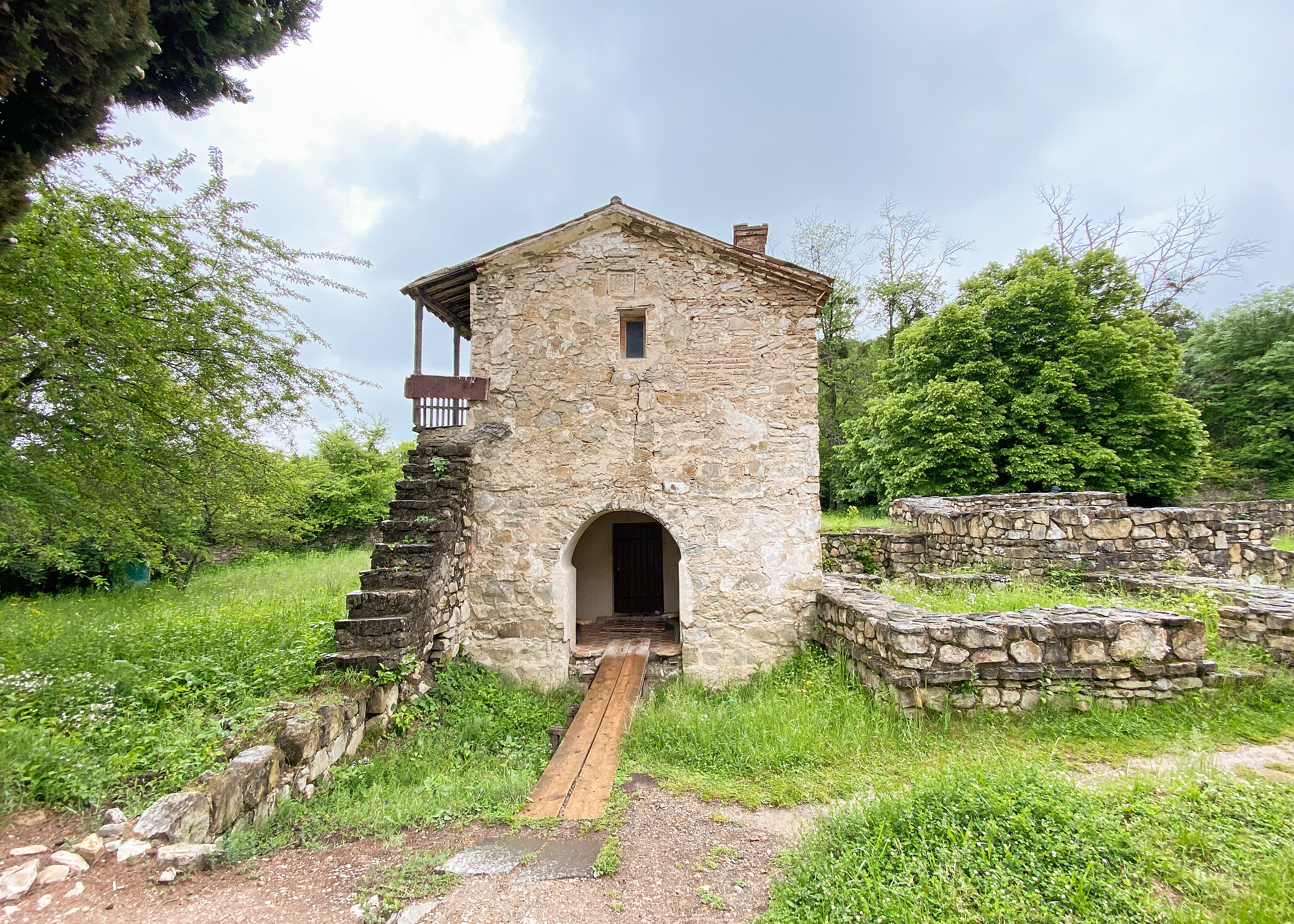
Church of the Holy Trinity

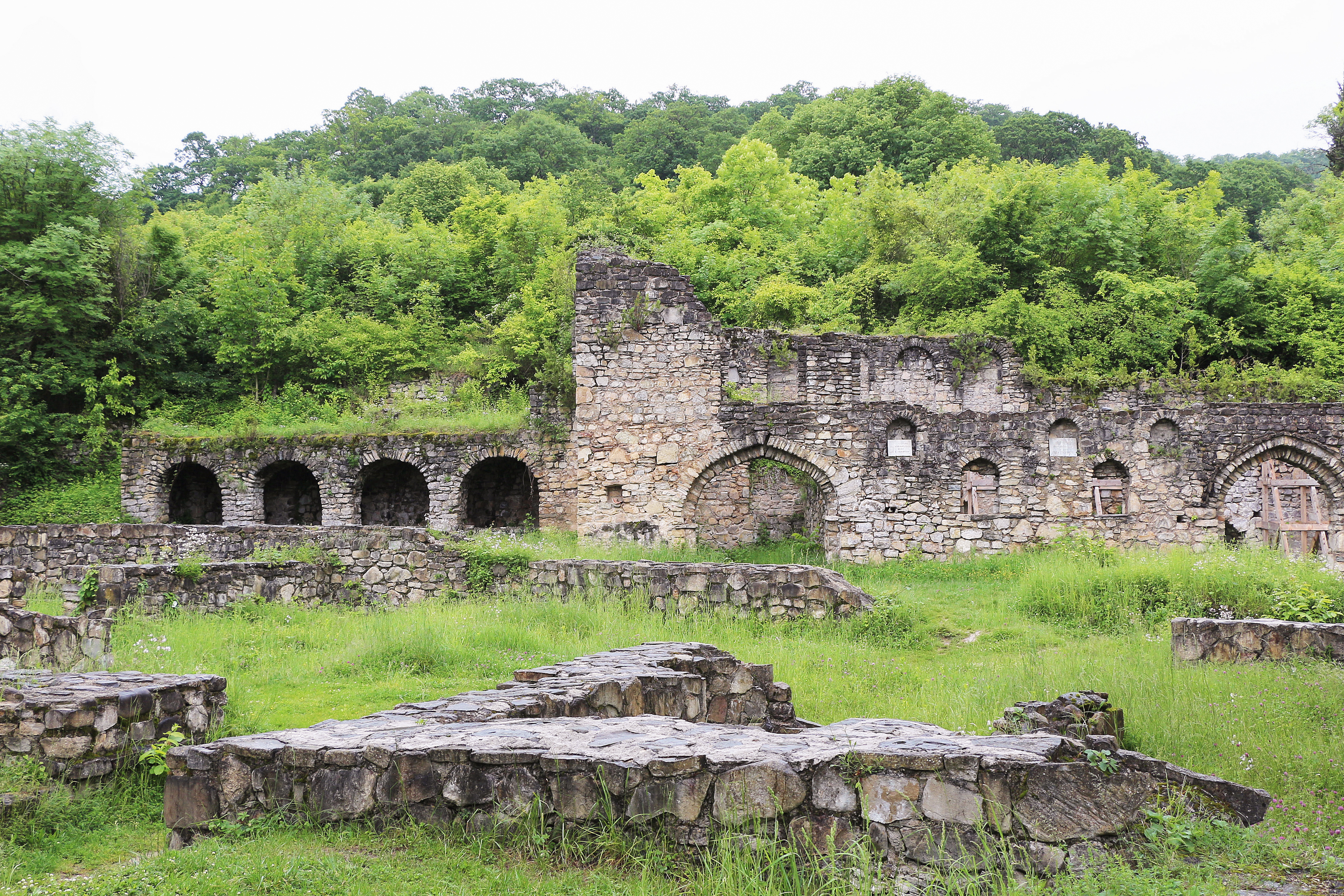
Ruins of the Ikalto Academy

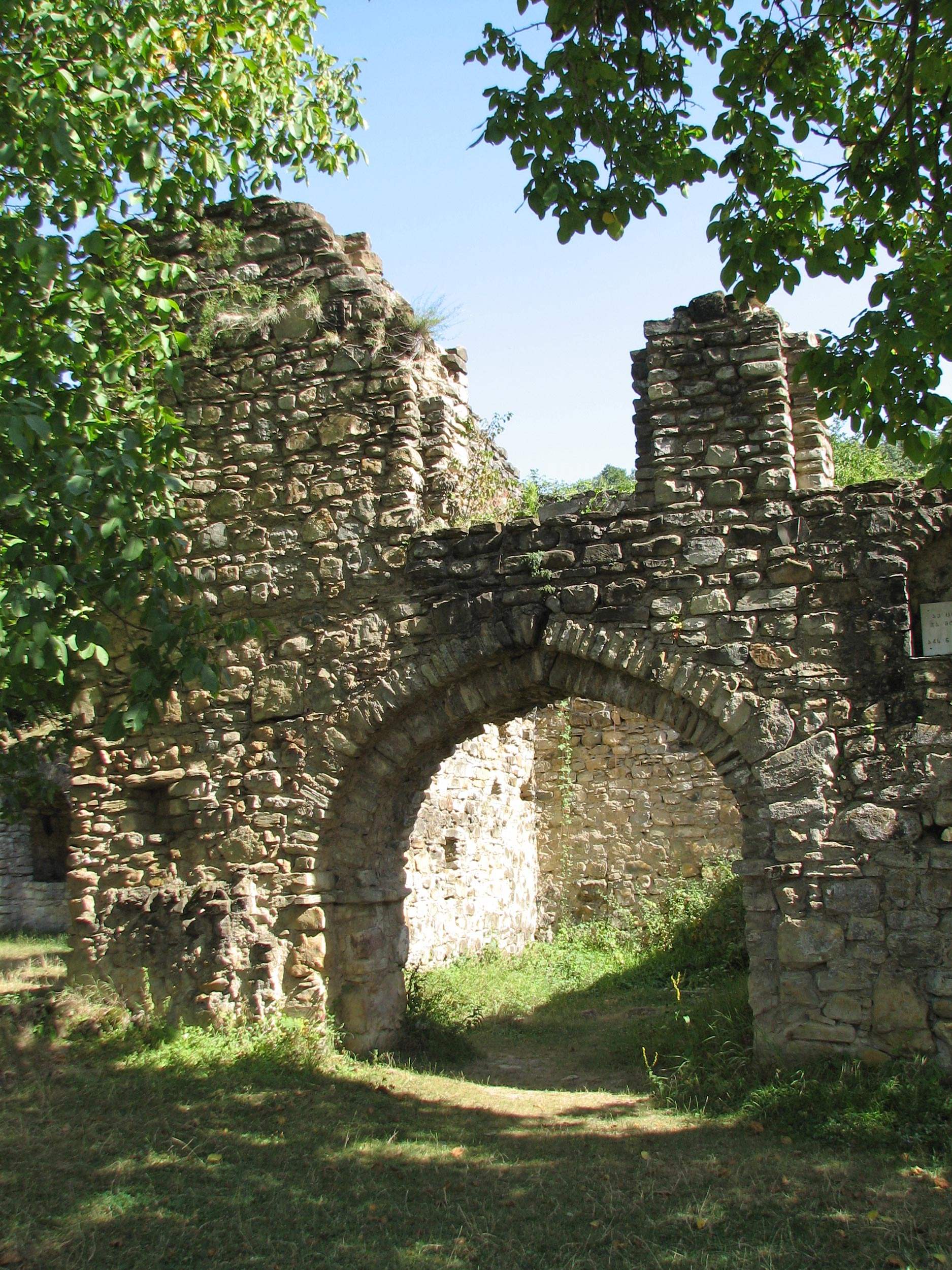
Ruins of the Ikalto Academy

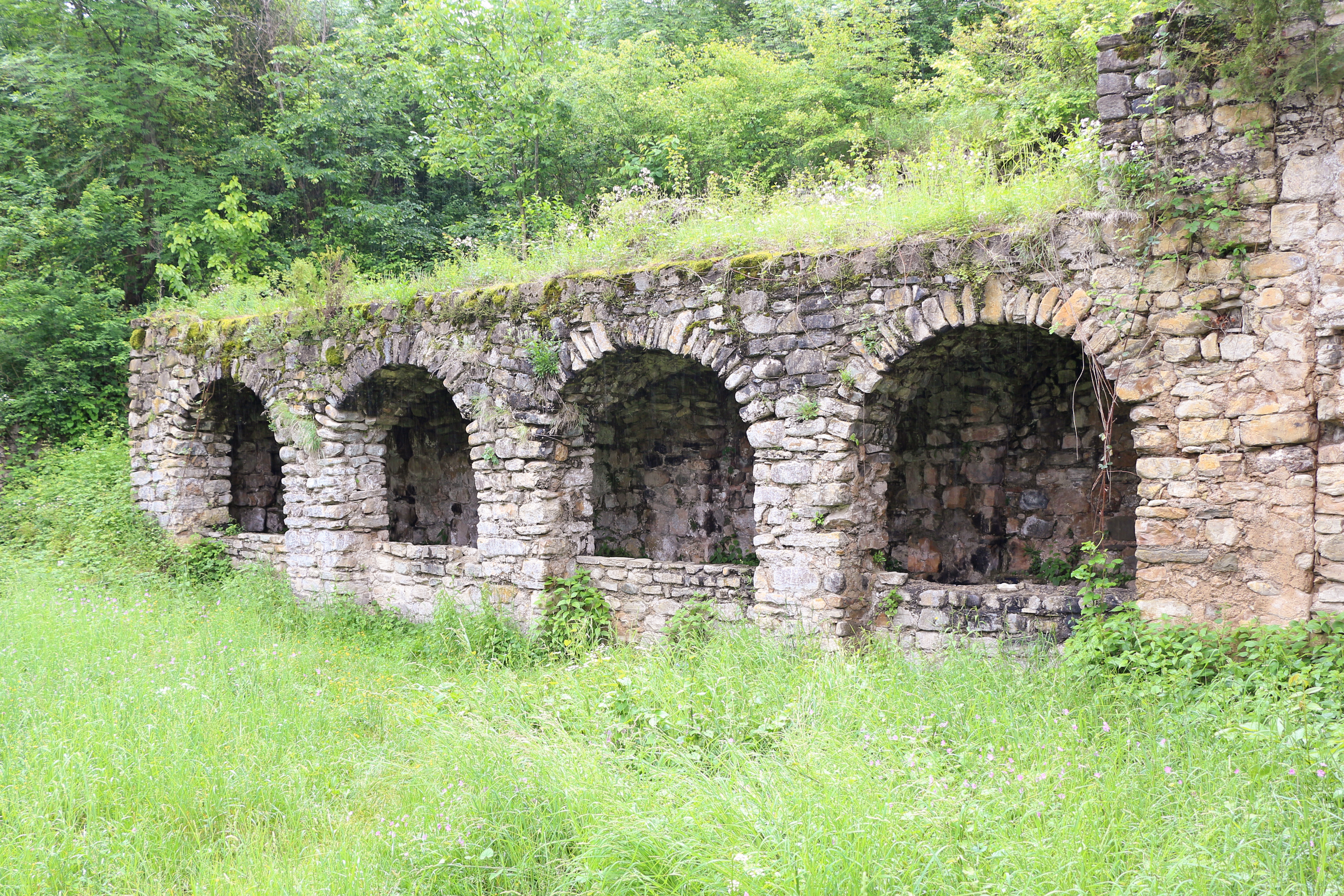
Winepress building

== See also ==
- Tsinandali
- Georgia
- Culture of Georgia
- History of Georgia
- Kakheti
- Telavi Municipality
