= Academy of Ikalto =

Ecclesiastical academy in medieval Georgia

- იყალთოს აკადემია (Georgian)
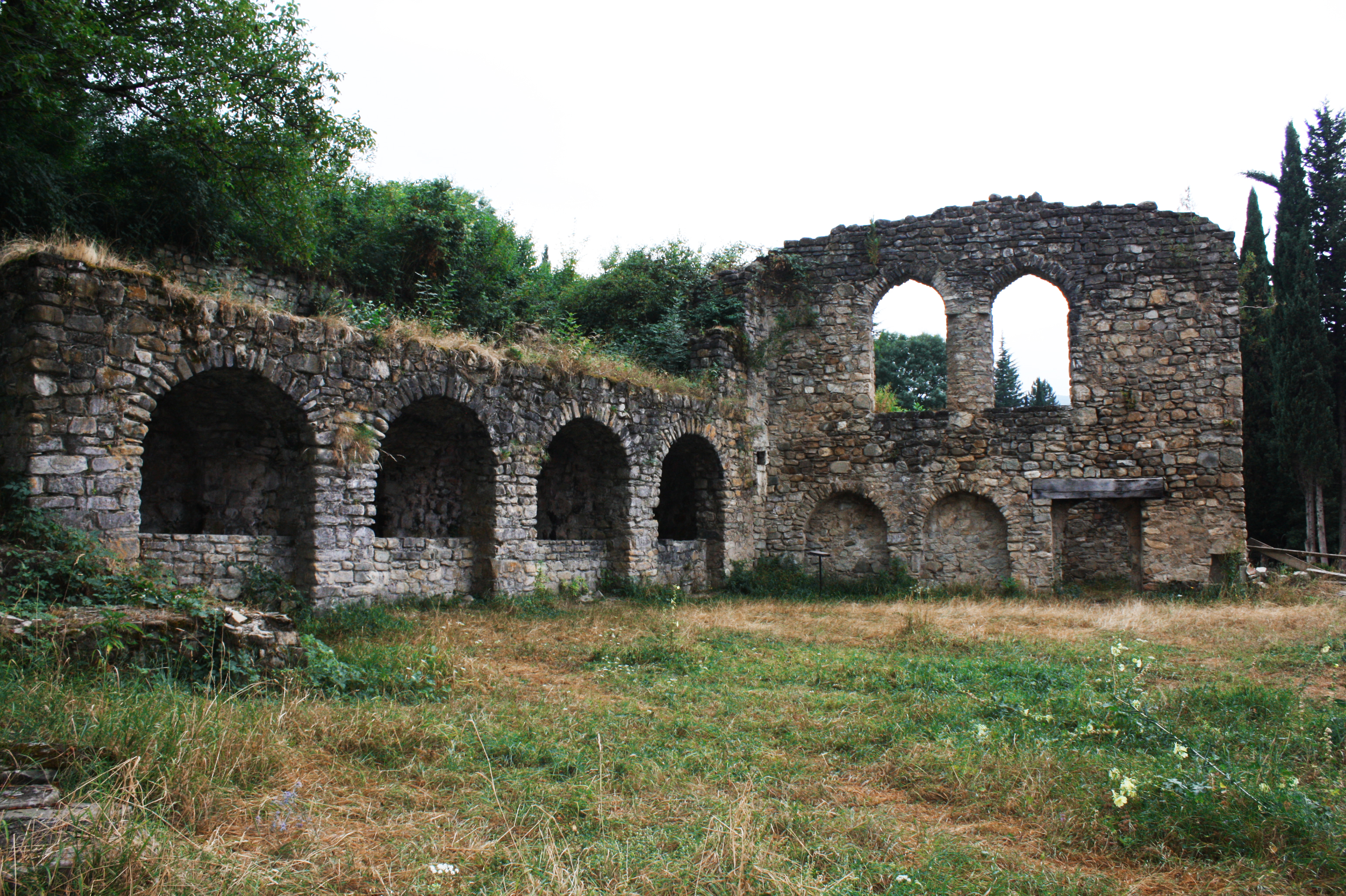
- Ruins of academy

- Location within Georgia
- 41°56′N 45°22′E
- Location: Ikalto
- Region: Kakheti

The Academy of Ikalto (Georgian: იყალთოს აკადემია, romanized: iq'altos ak'ademia) was an ecclesiastical academy established between the 11th-13th centuries in Kingdom of Georgia. Ikalto was known as one of the most significant cultural-scholastic centers of medieval Georgia, which is confirmed by the ruins of some civil building preserved at the site of the Ikalto Monastery.

== History ==
According to sources, the first academy in this area was founded in the 9th century, but during the Arab invasions it was entirely devastated. During the Georgian Renaissance, the tutor of David IV of Georgia, scholar and philosopher Arsen of Ikalto initiated the idea of refounding the academy at Ikalto. The first rector of the academy was Arsen, who presumably moved there from the Gelati Academy. Most of his oeuvre comprises translations of major doctrinal and polemical works, which he compiled as his massive Dogmatikon, "a book of teachings", which was influenced by the Aristotelianism of the era. The most complete surviving manuscript of this work (S-1463) dates to the 12th-13th century and includes sixteen key authors, such as Anastasius Sinaita, John of Damascus, Theodore Abucara, Michael Psellos, Cyril of Alexandria, Nikitas Stithatos, Pope Leo the Great and others. The academy of Ikalto had functioned for a long time, thus playing an important role in the history of Georgian enlightenment. Its pedagogy basically followed the Trivium-Quadrivium method.

== Architecture ==
The Ikalto Academy is much like the Gelati Academy except that it has two floors.

== Sources ==
- Georgian Soviet Encyclopedia, V, p. 287, Tbilisi, 1980
