= Palazzo dei Vescovi a San Miniato al Monte =

Coordinates: 43°45′33.81″N 11°15′53.90″E

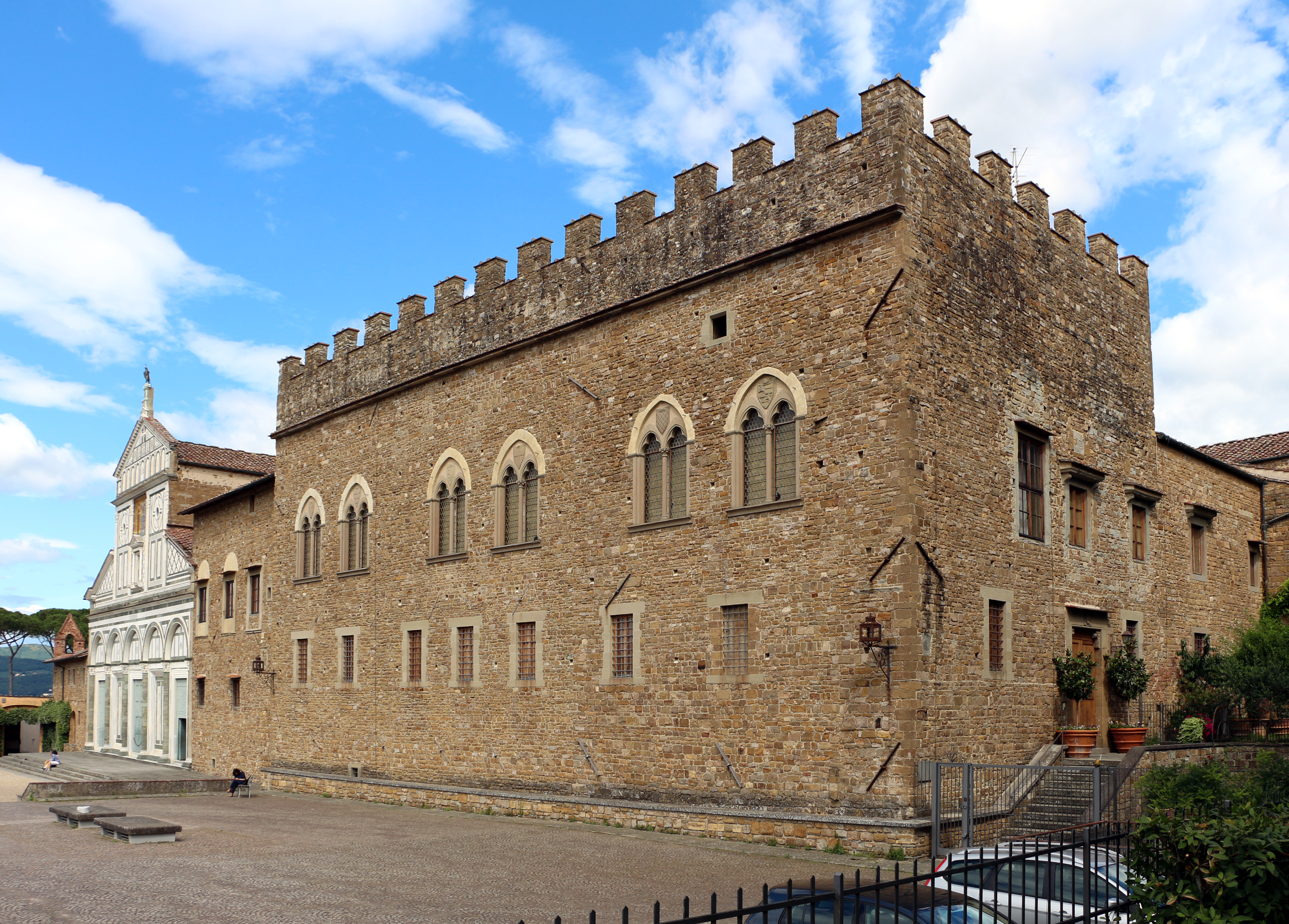
The Bishops' Palace

The Palazzo dei Vescovi at San Miniato al Monte was a summer residence of the Bishops of Florence and was built, at his own expense, by Monsignor Andrea dei Mozzi, Bishop of Florence, recalled by Dante in canto XV of Inferno.

== History and description ==
In 1320 the construction was completed by Bishop Antonio d'Orso and later another Florentine bishop Angelo Ricasoli made some additions.

The palace has ancient battlements and ogival windows with mullioned windows, on which can be seen the stone arms of the Church, Andrea dei Mozzi, Antonio d’Orso, the People of Florence and Angelo Ricasoli.

In 1574 the palace was annexed to the monastery of the Benedictines, in 1553 it was reduced to barracks for Spanish troops in the service of Cosimo I and suffered much damage and transformation. From 1630 to 1633 it was greatly damaged when it was used as an infirmary for plague victims.

It underwent new divisions, carried out by the Jesuits between 1703 and 1774. In the years 1903—1922, it was restored by the architect Henri Au-Capitaine, who restored the hall's frescoes.

== Bibliography ==
=== Italian sources ===
- Francesco Lumachi Firenze – Nuova guida illustrata storica-artistica-aneddotica della città e dintorni, Firenze, Società Editrice Fiorentina, 1929.
