= February 6 (Eastern Orthodox liturgics) =

Day in the Eastern Orthodox liturgical calendar

Eastern Orthodox liturgical calendar
February 5	February 6	February 7
February 6 O.S. ≍ February 19 N.S. February 6 N.S ≍ January 24 O.S.

An Eastern Orthodox cross

February 6 in Eastern Orthodox liturgical calendars is a feast day and a day of commemoration of saints and martyrs. Although some Orthodox churches use the Revised Julian Calendar and others use the traditional Julian calendar, the fixed commemorations for their respective February 6 are broadly the same, no matter which calendar is used. (Note: Despite the dates being the same, the days to which they refer typically differ by 13 days. The notation Old Style or O.S. is sometimes used to indicate a date in the traditional Julian Calendar (the "Old Calendar"). The notation New Style or N.S, indicates a date in the Revised Julian calendar (the "New Calendar").)

== Feasts ==
- After feast of the Meeting of Our Lord.

== Saints ==
- Venerable Bukolus, Bishop of Smyrna (c. 100)
- Martyrs Theophilus, Saturninus and Revocatus, in Spain (249-251) (Note: "The same day, the holy martyrs Saturninus, Theophilus, and Revocata.")
- Virgin-martyr Dorothea, and with her Martyrs Christina and Callista, sisters, and Theophilus, at Caesarea in Cappadocia (288-300) (Note: "At Caesarea, in Cappadocia, the birthday of St. Dorothy, virgin and martyr, who was stretched on the rack, then a long time scourged with boughs of the palm-tree, and finally condemned to capital punishment, under Sapricius, governor of that province. Her noble confession of Christ converted a lawyer named Theophilus, who was also tortured in a barbarous manner, and finally put to death by the sword.")
- Virgin-martyr Fausta, and with her Martyrs Evilasius and Maximus, at Cyzicus (305-311)
- Martyr Julian of Emesa the Physician, and Bishop Silvanus (312) (Note: "At Emesa, in Phoenicia, in the time of the emperor Maximian, St. Silvanus, bishop, who, after having governed that church forty years, was delivered to the beasts with two other Christians, and having his limbs all mangled, received the palm of martyrdom.")
- Martyrs Faustus, Basil and Lucianus, of Darion in Constantinople, by the sword. (Note: In the Synaxarion of St Nicodemus it records the name "Silounos/Silvanus of Emesa", instead of Lucianus. However in other Synaxaria their memory is given as October 25.)
- Venerable John of Lycopolis (John of Thebes), monk (4th century)
- Saint James, ascetic, of Syria (c. 460)
- Saints Barsanuphius the Great and John the Prophet, monks of Gaza (6th century)
- Saint Photius the Great, Patriarch of Constantinople, Confessor and Equal-to-the-Apostles (891)
- Virgin-martyrs Martha and Mary and their brother Lycarion, at Tanis (Hermopolis) in Egypt. (see also February 8 - Greek)

== Pre-Schism Western saints ==
- Saint Antholian (Anatolianus), mentioned by St Gregory of Tours as one of the martyrs of Auvergne in France under Valerian and Gallienus (c. 265) (Note: Fellow-sufferers were Sts Cassius, Maximus, Liminius and Victorinus.)
- Saint Mél of Ardagh (Mael), Bishop of Ardagh (488), disciple of St. Patrick. (Note: "MEL was by birth a Briton, who went to Ireland as a fellow-labourer with St. Patrick, by whom he was made Bishop of Ardagh. In some legends he is said to be one of the nephews of that great Apostle, but there is no sufficient warrant for such a tradition. According to an ancient calendar, St. Mel passed to his eternal rest on the 6th of February.") (Note: By tradition one of the four nephews of St Patrick ( Mel, Melchu, Munis and Rioch), sons of Conis and Darerca, St Patrick's sister. They accompanied St Patrick to Ireland, St Mel becoming the first Bishop of Ardagh.)
- Saint Mun, a nephew of St Patrick who consecrated him bishop (5th century) (Note: He ended his days as a hermit on an island in Lough Ree in Ireland.)
- Saint Vedast, Bishop of Arras (540) (Note: He preached with St Remigius to convert the Franks. He was Bishop of Arras-Cambrai in the north of France for nearly forty years. He instructed King Clovis for baptism, built churches and cared for the poor.) (Note: "The same day, the holy bishops Vedastus and Amandus, who were illustrious by many miracles, both in life and death. The former governed the church of Arras, the latter that of Maestricht.")
- Saint Amandus of Elnone Abbey, Apostle of Maastricht (675) (Note: Born near Nantes in France, he lived as a hermit in Bourges for fifteen years. At the age of thirty-three he became a bishop and preached in Flanders in Belgium, Carinthia in Austria and among the Basques in Spain. He founded many monasteries in all these places, of which the best known is Elnon near Tournai, where he went in his old age and reposed aged over ninety.)
- Saint Andrew of Elnone Abbey, a monk and disciple of St Amandus at Elnone in France, whom he succeeded as Abbot (c. 690) (Note: His relics were enshrined together with those of St Amandus in 694.)
- Saint Relindis of Maaseik (Renildis, Renula, Renule), Abbess of Maaseik in Belgium (c. 750) (Note: A nun together with her sister Herlindis in Valenciennes, she was gifted in embroidery and painting. On her sister's repose, she became Abbess of Maaseik in Belgium.)
- Saint Tanco of Werden (Tancho, Tatta), Abbot of Amalbarich Abbey in Saxony and eventually Bishop of Werden in Germany, martyred by pagans (808)

== Post-Schism Orthodox saints ==
- Saint Arsenius of Iqalto, Georgia (1127)
- Hieromartyr Damaskinos (Tzagkaris) the Sinaite, martyred outside the walls of the monastery by the Mezenites (1623)
- Saint Dorothea, Schema-nun, of Kashin (1629)
- Hieromartyr Artemios the Sinaite (1822) (Note: Hieromartyr Artemios the Sinaite ministered at the Holy-Trinity Metochion of the monastery, in Heraklion, Crete. The saint was a member of the entourage of Hieromartyr Neophytos the Sinaite (December 20), and was martyred in the year 1822.)

=== New martyrs and confessors ===
- New Hieromartyr Dimitry Rozhdestvensky, Archpriest, of Verny, and his son New Martyr Anatole (1922)
- New Hieromartyr Basil Nadezhnin, priest, of Moscow (1930) (Note: See: (in Russian) Василий (Надеждин). Википедии. (Russian Wikipedia).)
- New Hieromartyr Alexander, Priest (1938)

== Other commemorations ==
- Repose of Archbishop Theophan (Bystrov) of Poltava (1940)

== Icon gallery ==
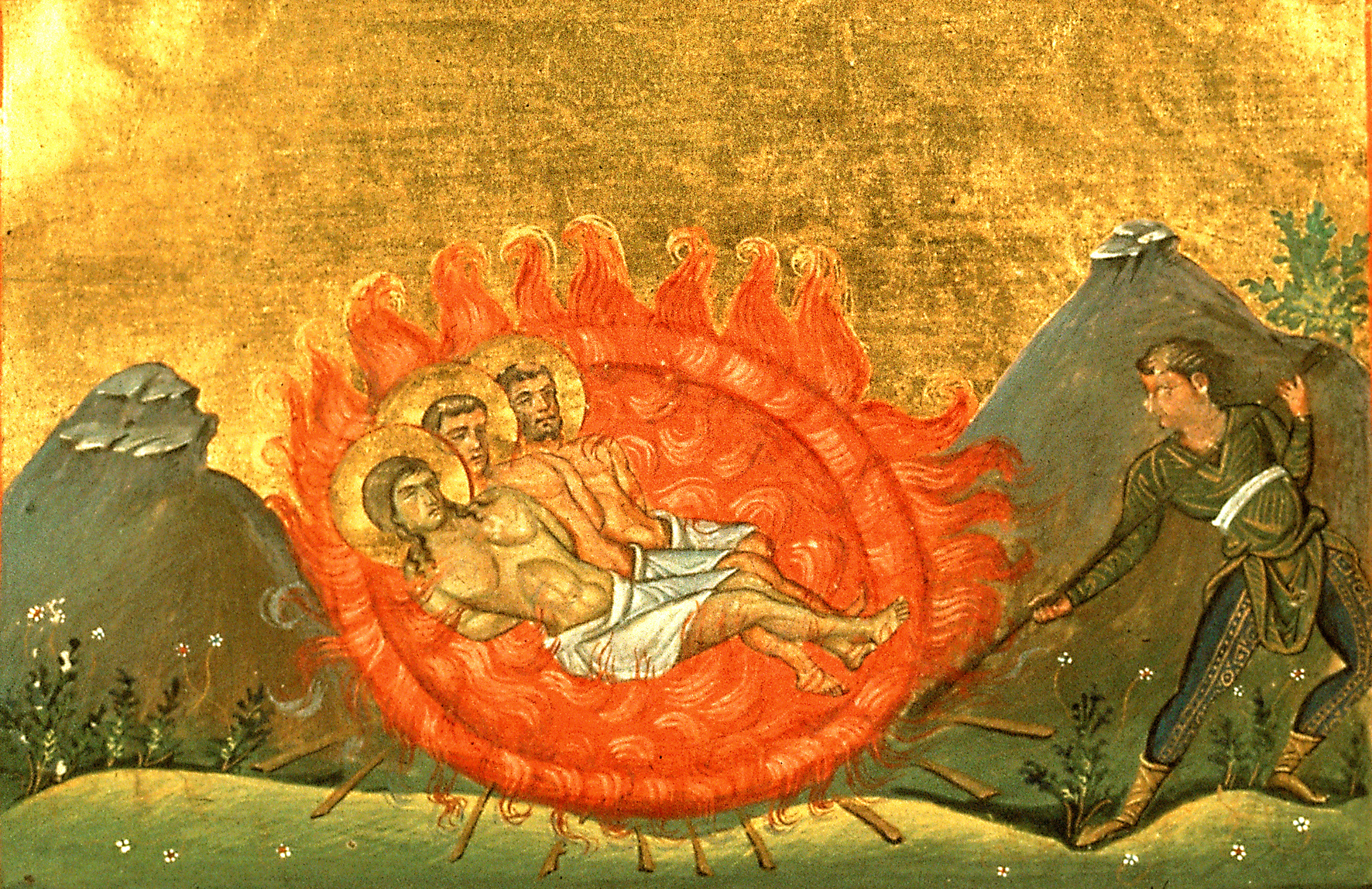
Virgin-martyr Fausta, with Martyrs Evilasius and Maximus.

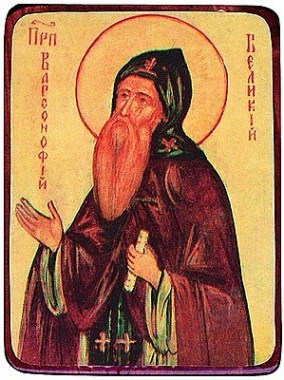
St Barsanuphius the Great.

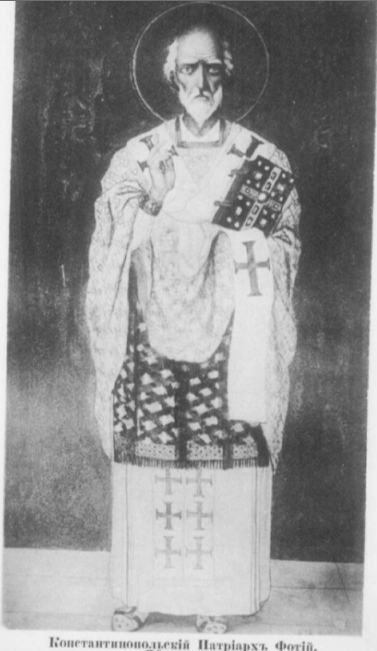
St. Photius, Patriarch of Constantinople.

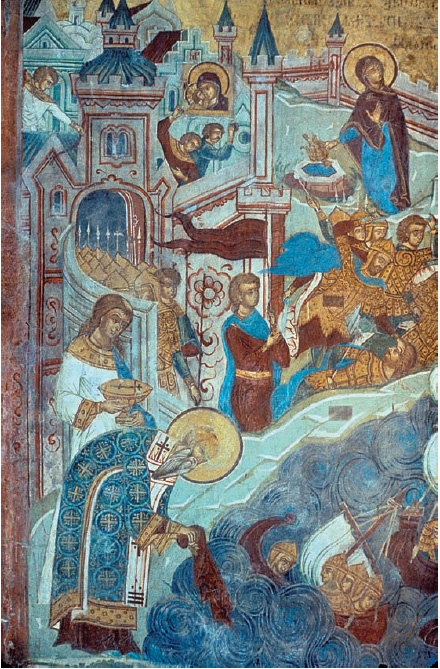
St. Photius' miraculous salvation of Constantinople (860), with the help of the Robe of the Mother of God.
(c. 1648).

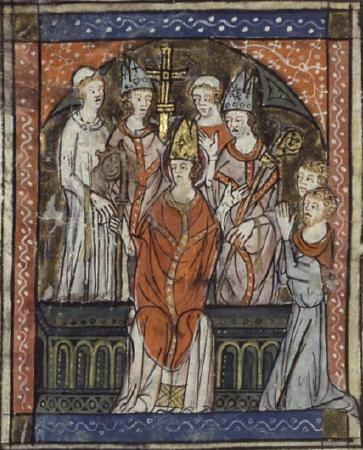
The ordination of St Vedast.

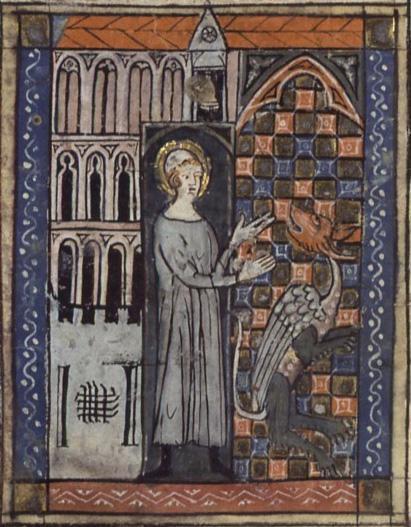
St. Amandus, Apostle of Maastricht.

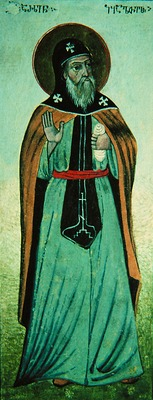
Saint Arsenius of Iqalto.

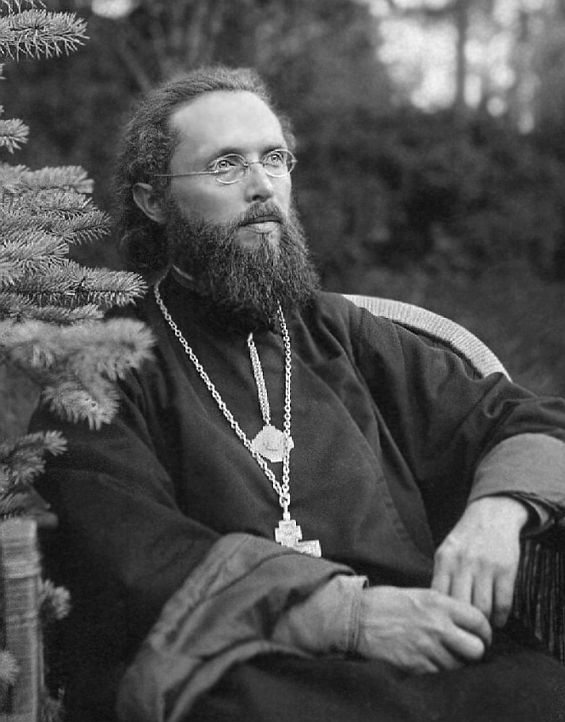
New Hieromartyr Basil Nadezhnin.

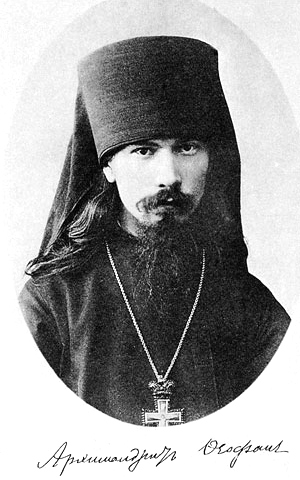
Theophan (Bystrov) of Poltava, as an Archimandrite.

== Sources ==
- February 6 / 19. Orthodox Calendar (Pravoslavie.ru).
- February 19 / 6. Holy Trinity Russian Orthodox Church (A parish of the Patriarchate of Moscow).
- February 6. OCA - The Lives of the Saints.
- The Autonomous Orthodox Metropolia of Western Europe and the Americas. St. Hilarion Calendar of Saints for the year of our Lord 2004. St. Hilarion Press (Austin, TX). p. 13.
- The Sixth Day of the Month of February. Orthodoxy in China.
- February 6. Latin Saints of the Orthodox Patriarchate of Rome.
- The Roman Martyrology. Transl. by the Archbishop of Baltimore. Last Edition, According to the Copy Printed at Rome in 1914. Revised Edition, with the Imprimatur of His Eminence Cardinal Gibbons. Baltimore: John Murphy Company, 1916. pp. 39–40.
- Rev. Richard Stanton. A Menology of England and Wales, or, Brief Memorials of the Ancient British and English Saints Arranged According to the Calendar, Together with the Martyrs of the 16th and 17th Centuries. London: Burns & Oates, 1892. p. 55.

Greek Sources

- Great Synaxaristes: (in Greek) 6 Φεβρουαρίου. Μεγασ Συναξαριστησ.
- (in Greek) Συναξαριστής. 6 Φεβρουαρίου. Ecclesia.gr. (H Εκκλησια Τησ Ελλαδοσ).

Russian Sources

- (in Russian) 19 февраля (6 февраля). Православная Энциклопедия под редакцией Патриарха Московского и всея Руси Кирилла (электронная версия). (Orthodox Encyclopedia - Pravenc.ru).
