= San Miniato al Monte =

Coordinates: 43.759758°N 11.264731°E

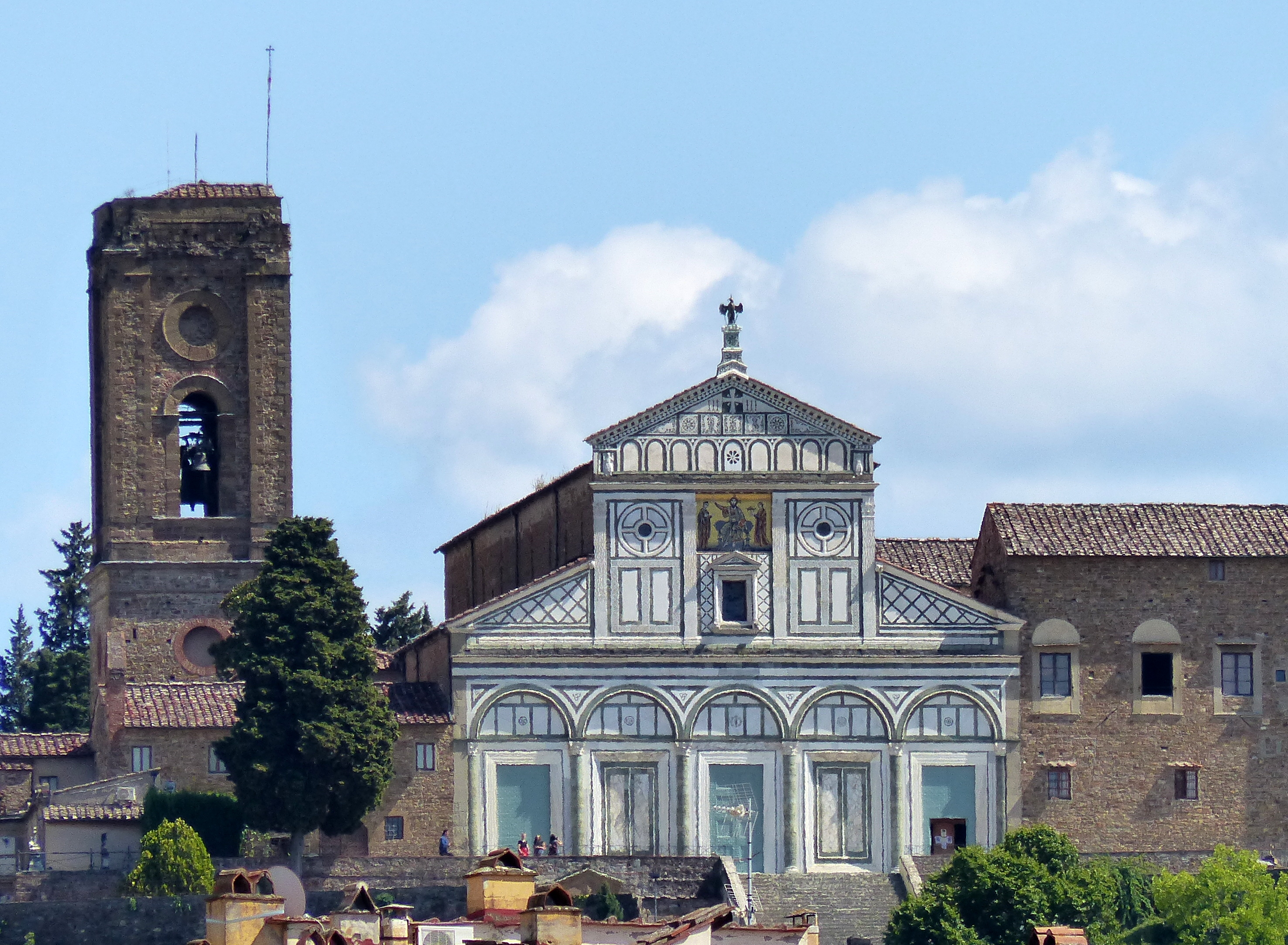
- San Miniato al Monte and the Bishop's palace
- San Miniato al Monte
- Location: Florence
- Country: Italy
- Denomination: Roman Catholic

Architecture
- Functional status: Active
- Architectural type: Basilica
- Style: Romanesque
- Years built: 1018

San Miniato al Monte ("St. Minias on the Mountain") is a basilica in Florence, central Italy, standing atop one of the highest points in the city. It has been described as one of the finest Romanesque structures in Tuscany and one of the most scenic churches in Italy. There is an adjoining Olivetan monastery, seen to the right of the basilica when ascending the stairs.

== History ==
St. Miniato or Minias (Armenian: Մինաս or Minas) was an Armenian prince serving in the Roman army under Emperor Decius. He was denounced as a Christian after becoming a hermit and was brought before the Emperor who was camped outside the gates of Florence. The Emperor ordered him to be thrown to beasts in the Amphitheatre where a panther was called upon him but refused to devour him. Beheaded in the presence of the Emperor, he is alleged to have picked up his head, crossed the Arno and walked up the hill of Mons Fiorentinus to his hermitage. A shrine was later erected at this spot and there was a chapel there by the 8th century. Construction of the present church was begun in 1013 by Bishop Alibrando and it was endowed by the Emperor Henry II. The adjoining monastery began as a Benedictine community, then passed to the Cluniacs and then in 1373 to the Olivetans, who still run it. The monks make famous liqueurs, honey and herbal teas, which they sell from a shop next to the church.

== Interior ==
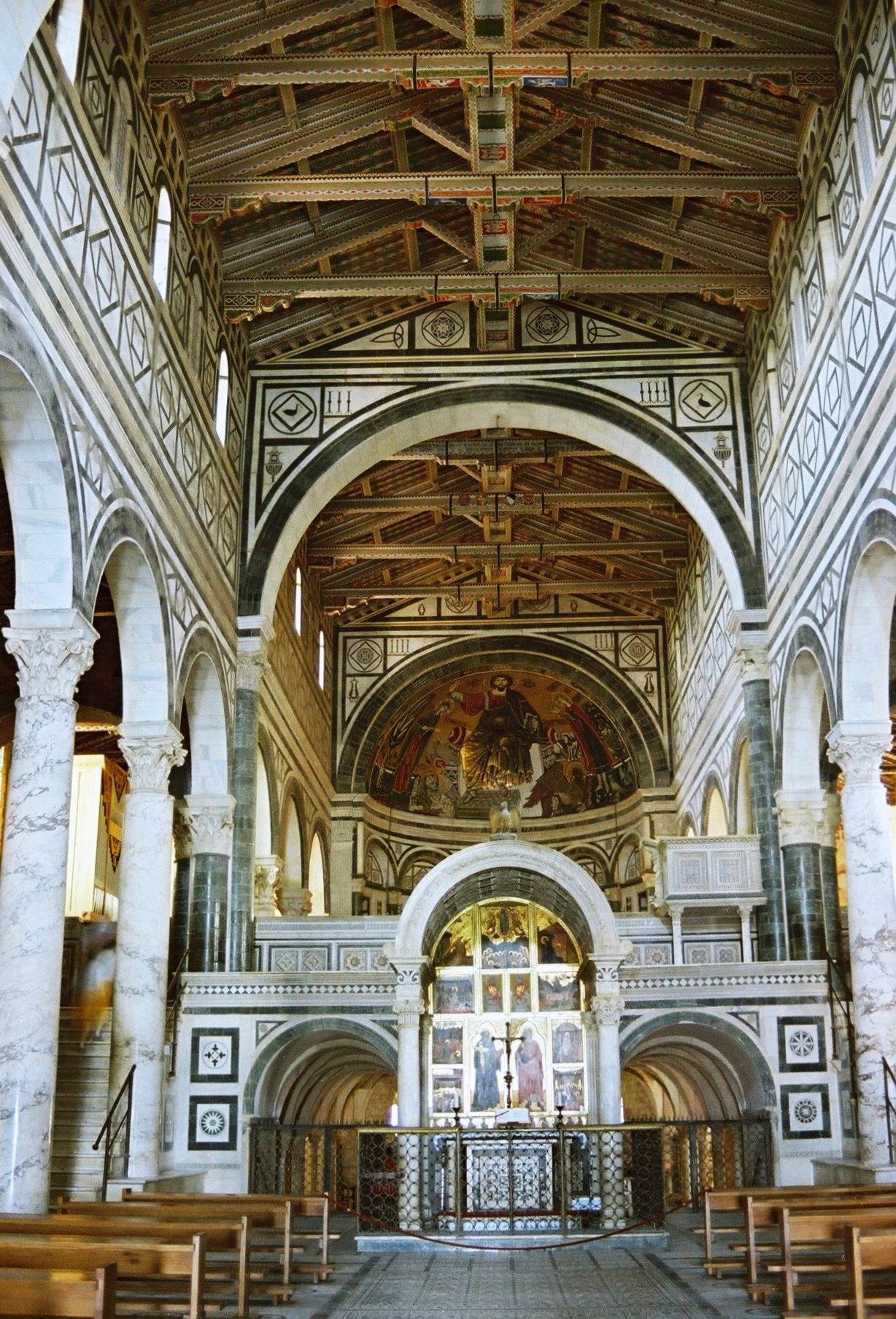
Interior of the church

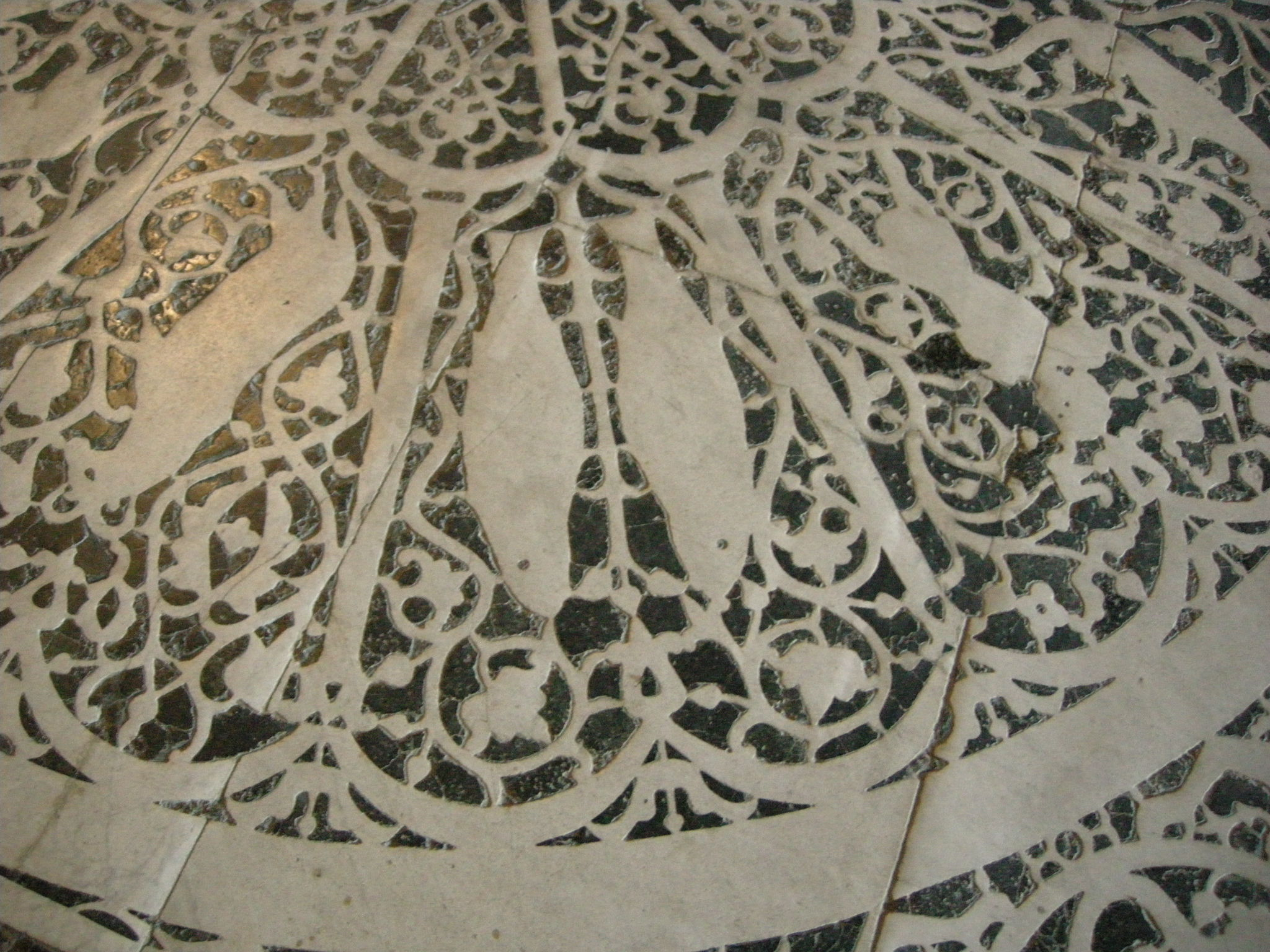
Zodiac detail, from the opus sectile pavement in San Miniato

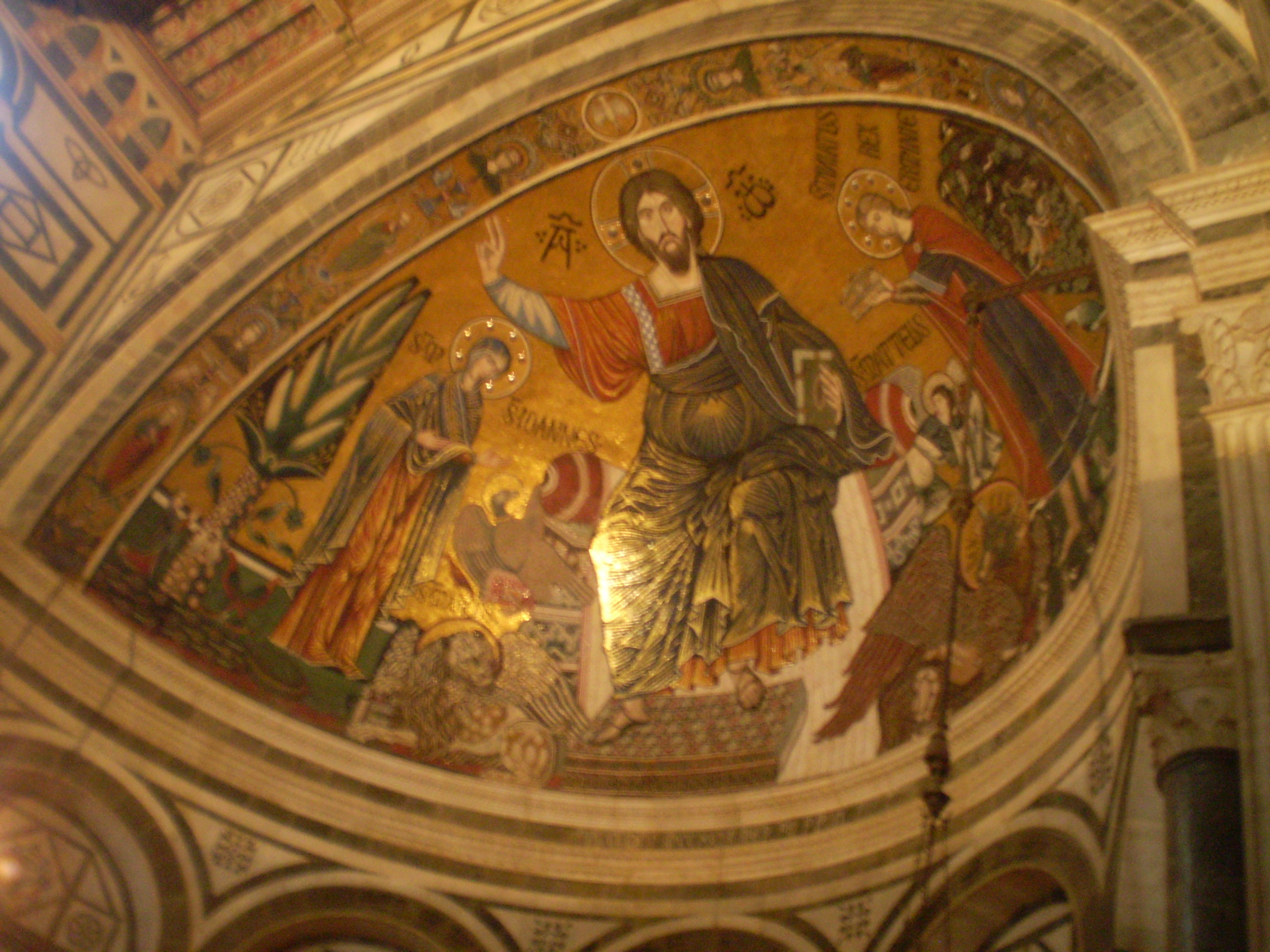
The mosaic depicting St. Miniato to the right of Christ holding a crown. The inscription reads: S. MINIATUS REX ERMINIE.

The interior exhibits the early feature of a choir raised on a platform above the large crypt. It has changed little since it was first built. The patterned pavement dates from 1207. The centre of the nave is dominated by the beautiful freestanding Cappella del Crocefisso (Chapel of the Crucifix), designed by Michelozzo in 1448. It originally housed the miraculous crucifix now in Santa Trìnita and is decorated with panels long thought to be painted by Agnolo Gaddi. The terracotta decoration of the vault is by Luca della Robbia. The crypt is the oldest part of the church and the high altar supposedly contains the bones of St Minias himself (although there is evidence that these were removed to Metz before the church was even built). In the vaults are frescoes by Taddeo Gaddi.

The raised choir and presbytery contain a magnificent Romanesque pulpit and screen made in 1207. The apse is dominated by a great mosaic of Christ between the Virgin and St Minias on its vaulted ceiling dating from 1297; the same subject is depicted on the façade of the church and is probably by the same unknown artist. The crucifix above the high altar is attributed to Luca della Robbia. The sacristy is decorated with a great fresco cycle on the Life of St Benedict by Spinello Aretino (1387).

=== Cardinal of Portugal Chapel ===
The Cappella del Cardinale del Portogallo to the left of the nave, seen as "one of the most magnificent funerary monuments of the Italian Renaissance", was built between 1460 and 1468 as a memorial to cardinal James of Lusitania, who died in Florence, to which he was Portuguese ambassador, in 1459. It is the only tomb in the church. The chapel is a collaboration of outstanding artists of Florence: it was designed by Brunelleschi's associate, Antonio Manetti, and finished after his death by Antonio Rossellino. The tomb was made by Antonio and Bernardo Rossellino. The chapel decoration is by Alesso Baldovinetti, Antonio and Piero del Pollaiuolo, and Luca della Robbia.

== Exterior ==
The geometrically patterned marble façade was probably begun in about 1090, although the upper parts date from the 12th century or later, financed by the Florentine Arte di Calimala (cloth merchants’ guild), who were responsible for the church's upkeep from 1288. The eagle which crowns the façade was their symbol.

The campanile collapsed in 1499 and was replaced in 1523, although it was never finished. During the siege of Florence in 1530 it was used as an artillery post by the defenders and Michelangelo had it wrapped in mattresses to protect it from enemy fire.

== Church complex ==
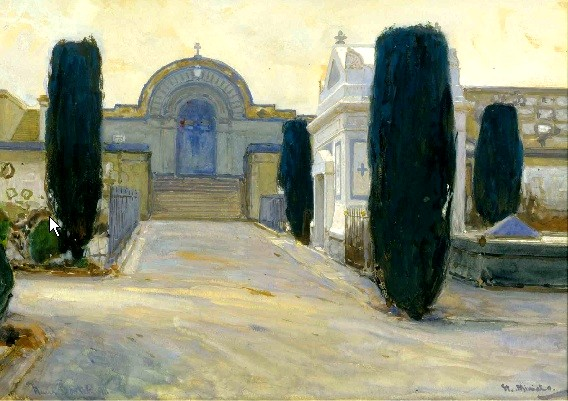
The Cemetery from the Basilica di San Miniato al Monte by Hans von Bartels

Adjacent to the church is the fine cloister, planned as early as 1426 and built from 1443 to mid-1450s. It was also designed by Bernardo and Antonio Rosselino, and financed by the Arte della Mercantia of Florence, and the fortified bishop's palace, built in 1295 and later used as a barracks and a hospital. The whole complex is surrounded by defensive walls, originally built hastily by Michelangelo during the siege and in 1553 expanded into a true fortress (fortezza) by Cosimo I de' Medici.

The walls now enclose a large ornate monumental cemetery, the Porte Sante, laid out in 1854. Buried there are Carlo Collodi, creator of Pinocchio; politician Giovanni Spadolini; painter Pietro Annigoni; poet and author Luigi Ugolini; film producer Mario Cecchi Gori; sculptor Libero Andreotti; fine artist Maria Luisa Ugolini Bonta; soprano Marietta Piccolomini; writer Giovanni Papini; experimental physicist Bruno Benedetto Rossi; and film director and opera producer Franco Zeffirelli.

== Trivia ==
The basilica served as an important setting in Brian de Palma's 1976 film Obsession.

On 16 June 2012, it was the venue for the religious wedding of Dutch royal Princess Carolina of Bourbon-Parma with businessman Albert Brenninkmeijer.

== See also ==
- Romanesque architecture
- Palazzo dei Vescovi a San Miniato al Monte
- Late medieval domes
