= Arsen of Iqalto =

Georgian churchman & theologian (??–c.1127)

Saint Arsenius of Iqalto
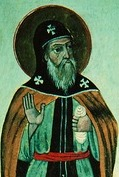

Venerable
- Born: c. 1050; Ikalto, Kingdom of Georgia
- Died: 1127; Mtskheta, Kingdom of Georgia
- Venerated in: Eastern Orthodox Church
- Feast: February 6
- Patronage: Georgia

Arsen Iqaltoeli or Arsen of Iqalto (Georgian: არსენ იყალთოელი; c. 1050 – 1127) was a Georgian churchman, theologian, calligrapher, and religious author who played a significant role in the ecclesiastic life of Georgia during the reign of David IV (r. 1089–1125), with whom he collaborated in developing Georgian monastic academies. His efforts in translating and compiling major doctrinal and polemical works from Greek gave a novel impetus to Georgian patristic and philosophical literature. Arsen was canonized by the Eastern Orthodox Church, which commemorates him on February 6.

== Life ==
Arsen is apparently the same person as Arsen Vachesdze mentioned in several manuscripts. Furthermore, some Georgian scholars identify him with Arsen Beri (Arsenius "the Monk"; fl. 1100), the author of the metaphrastic revision of The Life of Saint Nino. According to historic tradition, Arsen was born in Ikalto in the province of Kakheti, east of Tbilisi, Georgia's modern capital. He was educated in Constantinople at the Mangana academy, the centre of Byzantine philosophical activity and classical learning, and served as a monk on the Black Mountain near Antioch under the tutelage of Ephraim the Minor. Around 1114, Iqaltoeli, along with several other Georgian repatriate monks, responded to King David IV's call to join the reconstructed Georgian church. Along with John of Petrizos, Iqaltoeli brought the Byzantine philosophical tradition to the newly founded Georgian academe at Gelati and helped found a similar academy at Iqalto. Finally, he established himself at the Shio-Mgvime monastery in Kakheti.

Iqaltoeli probably played a key role in the debate between Armenian and Georgian churchmen organized by David IV in a futile attempt to reconcile doctrinal differences between the two churches in 1123. He outlived David and composed the king's epitaph.

Most of Iqaltoeli's work, both abroad and in Georgia, consists of translations of major doctrinal and polemical works, which he compiled as his massive Dogmatikon, "a book of teachings", influenced by Aristotelianism. The most complete surviving manuscript of this work (S-1463) dates to the 12th–13th century and includes sixteen key authors, such as Anastasius Sinaita, John of Damascus, Theodore Abucara, Michael Psellos, Cyril of Alexandria, Nikitas Stithatos, Pope Leo the Great, and others.
