= Minias =

Saint Minias
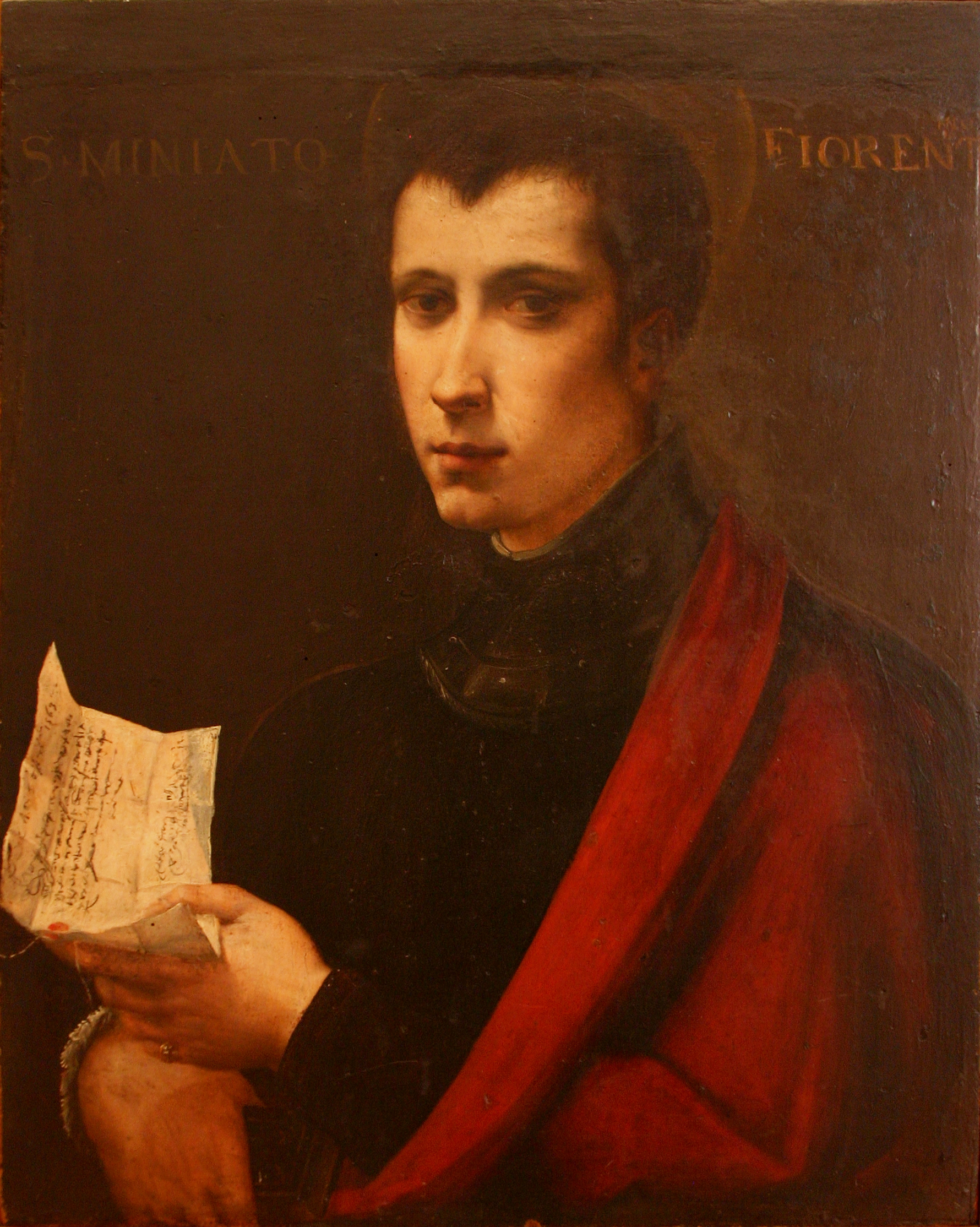
- Depiction in Palermo, Sicily

Martyr
- Born: present-day Armenia
- Died: 250 AD; Florence, present-day Italy
- Venerated in: Roman Catholic Church
- Major shrine: San Miniato al Monte, Florence
- Feast: 25 October
- Attributes: Depicted as a young prince holding a crown; crowned with a rod and palm; crowned with a lily, rod and palm; carrying his severed head

Saint Minias (died 250 AD), also known as Minas (Armenian: Մինաս) or Miniatus (Italian: Miniato), is venerated as the first Christian martyr of Florence. The church of San Miniato al Monte is dedicated to him. According to legend, he was an Armenian king or prince serving in the Roman Army – or making a penitential pilgrimage to Rome – who had decided to become a hermit near Florence.

He was denounced as a Christian and in 250 AD brought before Emperor Decius, who was persecuting Christians. Miniato refused to sacrifice to the Roman gods, and was put through numerous torments – he was thrown into a furnace, was lapidated, and was thrown to a lion or a panther at an amphitheatre – from which he emerged unharmed. Finally, he was beheaded near the present Piazza della Signoria, but his legend states that he picked up his own head. Miniato then crossed the Arno and returned to his hermitage on the hill known as Mons Florentinus (Monte di Firenze).

== Veneration ==
Minias' relics rest in a crypt in the church dedicated to him, begun by Alibrando (Hildebrand), Bishop of Florence, in 1013 and endowed by Henry II, Holy Roman Emperor.

The historicity of the saint is uncertain. It is possible that there was a saint with this name who was martyred near the Arno. He may simply have been a soldier who was executed for spreading Christianity in the army.

His cult may also have arisen from the fact that a relic from a location in the East, such as Egypt, was brought to the church that would be known as San Miniato.

The tradition of him picking up his own head—a hagiographic trope— was first recorded by Giovanni Villani.
