= Ikalto, Georgia =

Ikalto იყალთო
- Village
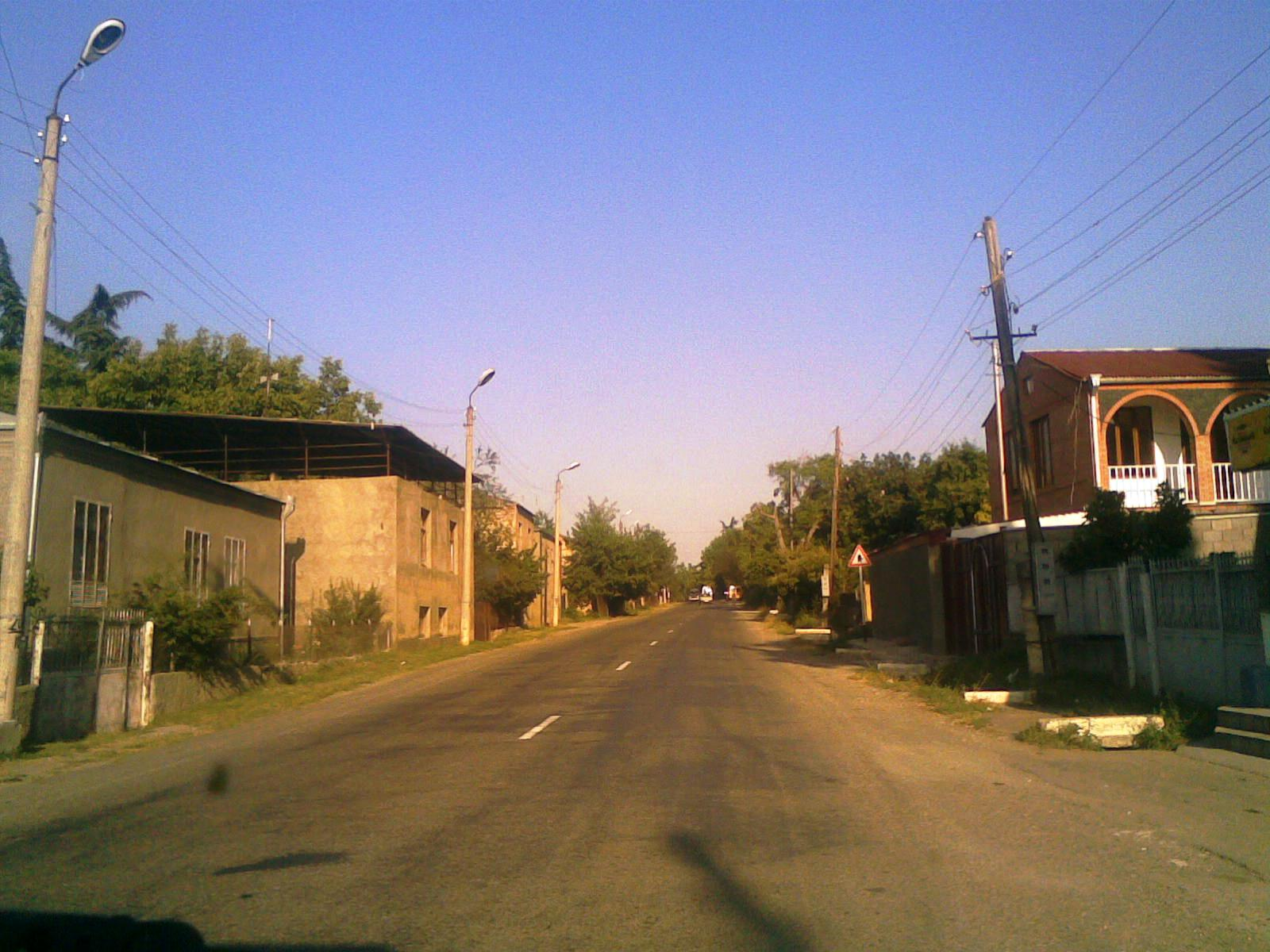

- Location within Georgia
- Coordinates: 41°56′50″N 45°23′22″E
- Country: Georgia
- Region: Kakheti
- District: Telavi

Population (2014)
  - Total: 2,034 ▼
- Time zone: GMT+4:00
- Area code: +995

Ikalto (Georgian: იყალთო), is a village in the Telavi district of Georgia.

== Demography ==
Census Year	population
2002	2365
2014	2034 ▼
