= Medieval Abkhazia =

- 8th century–18th century
- Status: Kingdom / Principality
- Capital: Anacopia
- Common languages: Abkhaz, Georgian, Greek
- Religion: Christianity (Eastern Orthodox), later Islamic influence
- Government: Monarchy
- King / Prince
- Historical era: Middle Ages
  - Emergence of the Kingdom of Abkhazia: 8th century
  - Ottoman suzerainty: 18th century
Preceded by	Succeeded by
Byzantine Empire; Kingdom of Kartli	Ottoman Empire; Russian Empire

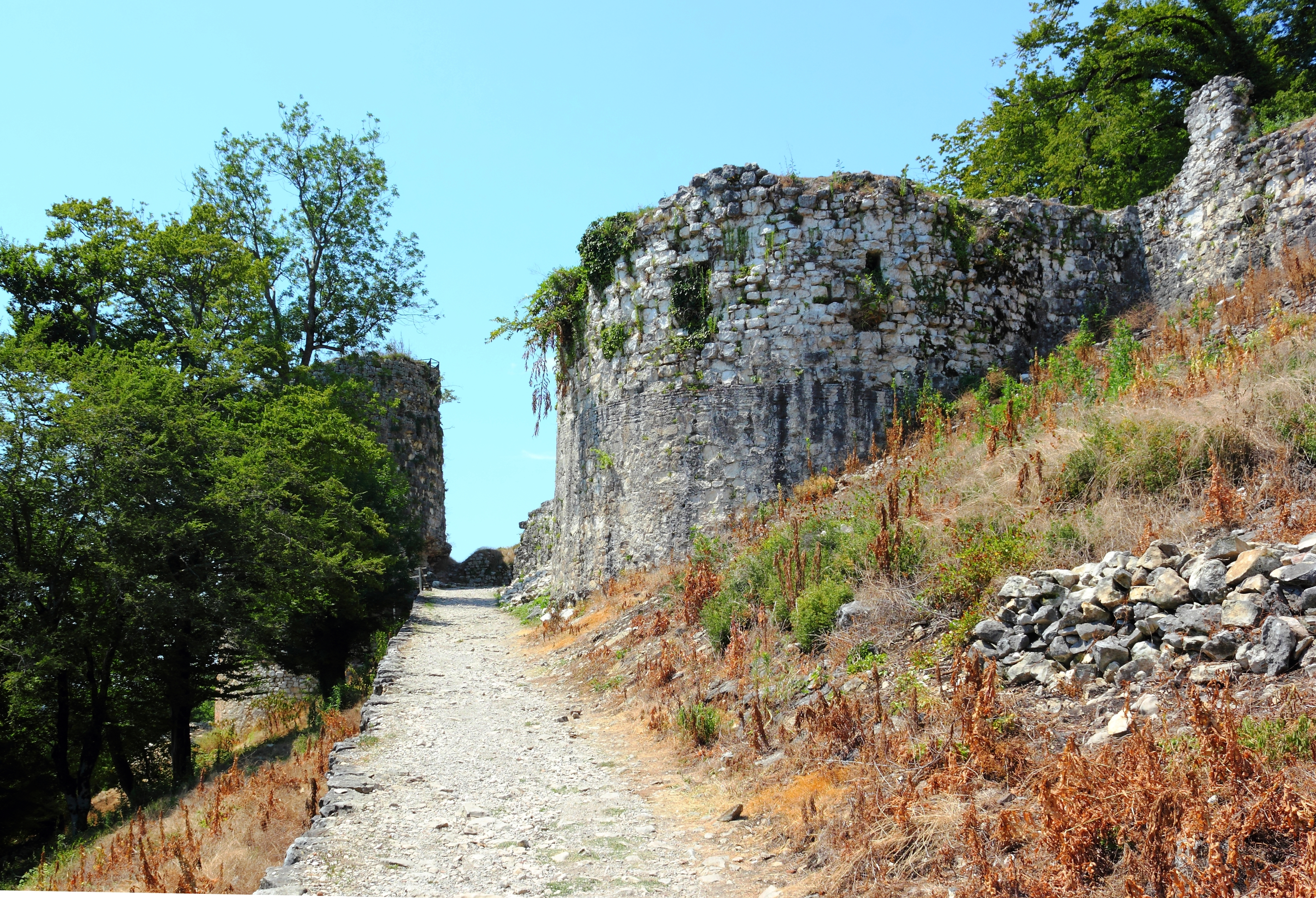
The ruins of Anacopia Fortress, the former capital of the Kingdom of Abkhazia.

Medieval Abkhazia refers to the historical period during which the region of Abkhazia, located in the western Caucasus, was influenced by various political entities, including the Byzantine Empire, the Kingdom of Abkhazia, and later, the Kingdom of Georgia. From the early Middle Ages until the late medieval period, Abkhazia played a crucial role in regional geopolitics, serving as a cultural and economic bridge between the Black Sea and the Caucasus.

== Early Medieval Period ==
During the early medieval period (5th–8th centuries), Abkhazia was under the strong influence of the Byzantine Empire. The region adopted Christianity as its dominant religion, and many churches and monasteries were built during this period. The Byzantine influence was evident in Abkhazia’s political structure, art, and architecture.

== The Kingdom of Abkhazia (8th–10th centuries) ==
In the late 8th century, the Kingdom of Abkhazia emerged as an independent entity, breaking away from Byzantine control. The kingdom reached its peak under King Leon II (r. 780–820), who expanded its territory and established close ties with the Georgian regions. The capital of the kingdom was Anacopia, a strategically important fortress.

By the 10th century, the Kingdom of Abkhazia controlled most of western Georgia. Under King George II (r. 923–957), the kingdom reached its height, but soon internal strife and dynastic struggles led to its decline.

== Integration into the Kingdom of Georgia (11th–15th centuries) ==
In 1008, the Kingdom of Abkhazia was united with the Kingdom of Kartli to form the Kingdom of Georgia under Bagrat III. Abkhazia became an integral part of the Georgian realm, contributing to its political, cultural, and military strength.

During the 12th and 13th centuries, under the rule of King David IV and Queen Tamar, Abkhazia enjoyed economic prosperity and was an essential part of the Georgian Golden Age. However, the Mongol invasions of the 13th century weakened the kingdom, leading to fragmentation.

== Late Medieval Abkhazia (15th–18th centuries) ==
By the 15th century, the Kingdom of Georgia fragmented into several principalities, including the Principality of Abkhazia. The ruling Sharvashidze (Chachba) dynasty governed the region, often balancing between Ottoman and Georgian influences. Over time, Abkhazia increasingly came under Ottoman suzerainty, adopting elements of Islamic culture while maintaining Christian traditions.

== Sources ==
- Suny, Ronald Grigor (1994). The Making of the Georgian Nation. Indiana University Press.
- Lordkipanidze, Mariam (1987). Georgia in the XI–XV Centuries. Tbilisi State University Press.
- Allen, W.E.D. (1932). A History of the Georgian People. Taylor & Francis.
- Braund, David (1994). Georgia in Antiquity: A History of Colchis and Transcaucasian Iberia, 550 BC–AD 562. Clarendon Press.
- Rapp, Stephen H. (2003). Studies in Medieval Georgian Historiography: Early Texts and Eurasian Contexts. Peeters.
- Rayfield, Donald (2012). Edge of Empires: A History of Georgia. Reaktion Books.
