= Kingdom of Abkhazia =

Feudal state in the Caucasus (778–1008)

Kingdom of Abkhazia აფხაზთა სამეფო apkhazta samepo Αμπχαζικό βασίλειο
- 778–1008
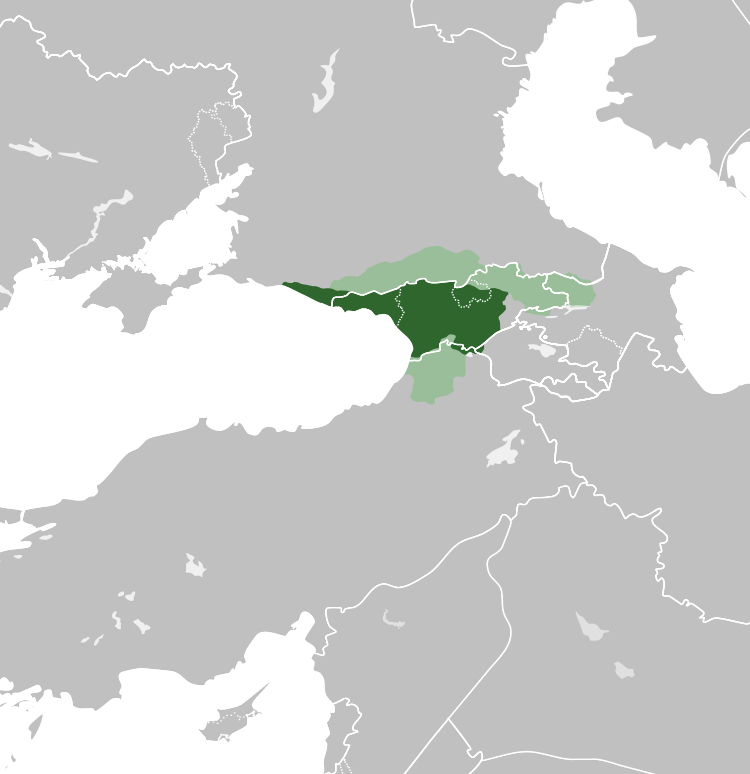
- The Kingdom of Abkhazia from 850–950, at the peak of its territorial expansion. (Superimposed on modern borders.) Kingdom of Abkhazia Tributaries and sphere of influence
- Capital: Anacopia (778–786); Kutaisi (786–1008)
- Common languages: Georgian (language of literacy and culture) Greek/Georgian (religious) (Note: "It was also during the tenth century that the language of the church in Abkhazia shifted from Greek to Georgian (Inal-Ipa, 1965, p. 570).") Arabic (numismatics) (Note: "Bagrat minted coins in Kutaisi: demonstrating his political ambitions, the obverse read in Georgian, ‘O Christ, magnify Bagrat king of the Abkhaz’, and in Arabic, ‘There is no God but one’, while the reverse read in Arabic, ‘Mohammad messenger of God’.")
- Religion: Eastern Orthodox (Georgian Orthodox Church, pre-Schism)
- Government: Principality; (c. 510–767); Feudal Monarchy; (767–1008)
- Archon
  - c. 510–530: Anos (first)
  - c. 745–767: Leon I (last)
- King
  - 767–828: Leon II (first)
  - 978–1008: Bagrat III (last)
- Historical era: Early Middle Ages
  - Declared independence from the Byzantine Empire: 778
  - Unification of the Georgian Kingdom: 1008
- Currency: Various Byzantine and Arab coins
Preceded by	Succeeded by
Principality of Abasgia; Lazica	Kingdom of Georgia
- Today part of: Georgia; Russia; Turkey

The Kingdom of Abkhazia (Georgian: აფხაზთა სამეფო, romanized: apkhazta samepo; lit. 'Kingdom of the Abkhazians', Greek: Αμπχαζικό βασίλειο, romanized: Ampchazikó vasíleio) was a medieval feudal state in the Caucasus which was established in the 780s. Through dynastic succession, it was united in 1008 with the Kingdom of the Iberians, forming the Kingdom of Georgia.

Byzantine sources record that in the early years of the 10th century Abkhazia stretched three hundred Greek miles along the Black Sea coast, from the frontiers of the thema of Chaldia to the mouth of the river Nicopsis, with the Caucasus behind it.

== History ==
=== Background ===
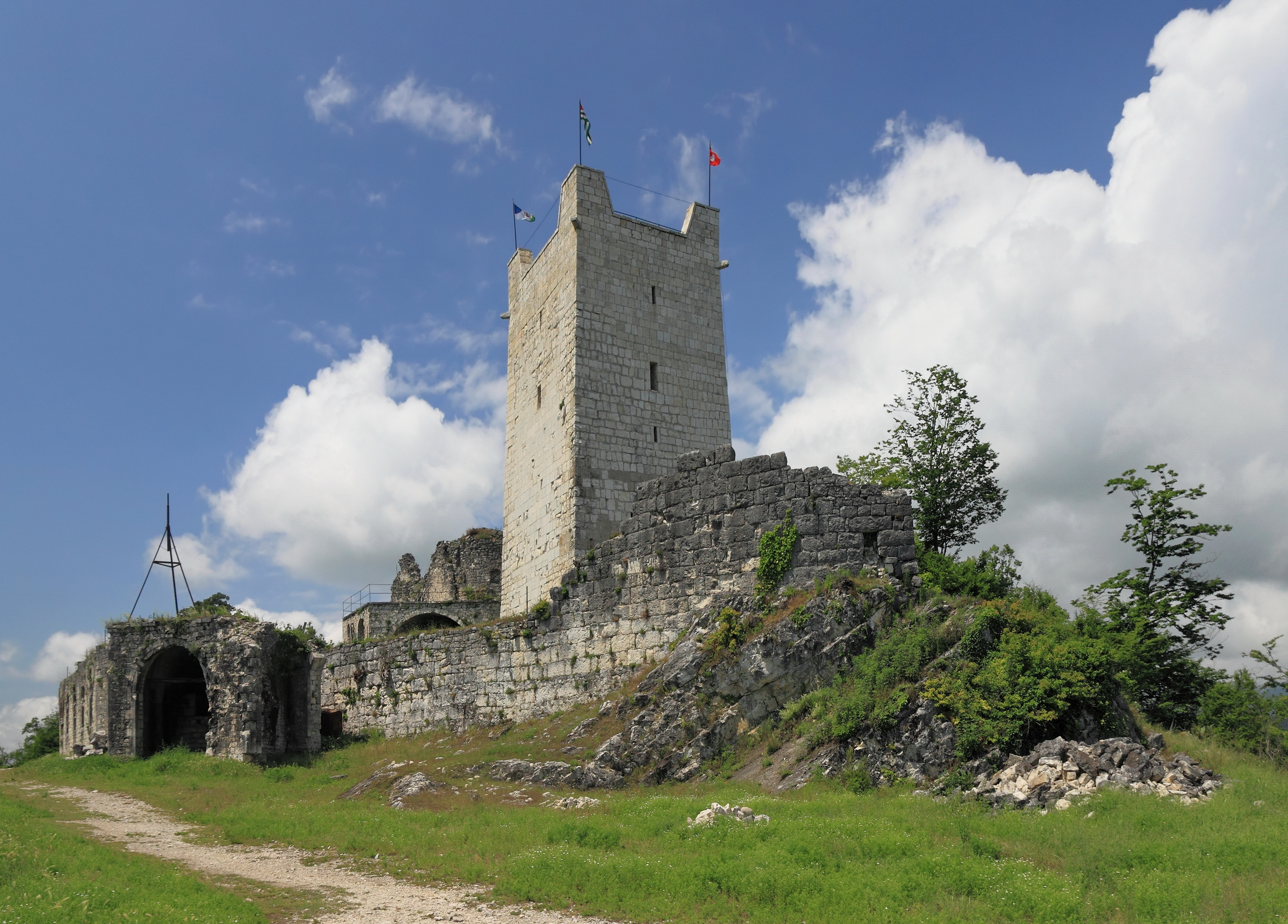
Ruins of Anacopia Fortress

Abkhazia was a princedom under Byzantine authority. It lay chiefly along the Black Sea coast in what is now the northwestern part of the modern-day Georgia (disputed Republic of Abkhazia) and extended northward into the territory of today's Krasnodar Krai of Russia. It had Anacopia as its capital. Abkhazia was ruled by a hereditary archon who effectively functioned as a Byzantine viceroy. The country was chiefly Christian and the city of Pityus was a seat of an archbishop directly subordinated to the Patriarch of Constantinople. Another Abasgian episcopal see was that of Soterioupolis.

In 735, a large expedition led by Arab general Marwan was launched against the Georgian kingdoms. The Arabs, pursuing the retreating Georgian princes – brothers Mirian and Archil – surged into Abkhazia in 736. Dysentery and floods, combined with a stubborn resistance offered by the archon Leon I and his Iberian and Lazic allies, made the invaders retreat. Leon I then married Mirian's daughter, and a successor, Leon II exploited this dynastic union to acquire Lazica in the 770s. Presumably considered as a successor state of Lazica (Egrisi, in Georgian sources), this new polity continued to be referred to as Egrisi (Lazica) in some contemporary Georgian (e.g., The Vitae of the Georgian Kings by Leonti Mroveli) and Armenian (e.g., The History of Armenia by Hovannes Draskhanakertsi) chronicles.

=== Establishment and consolidation ===
The successful defense against the Arabs, and new territorial gains, gave the Abkhazian princes enough power to claim more autonomy from the Byzantine Empire. Towards circa 778, Leon II won his full independence with the help of the Khazars; he assumed the title of "King of the Abkhazians" and transferred his capital to the western Georgian city of Kutaisi. According to Georgian annals, Leon subdivided his kingdom into eight duchies: Abkhazia proper, Tskhumi, Bedia, Guria, Racha and Takveri, Svaneti, Argveti, and Kutatisi. During his reign Abkhazian kingdom was at the stage of the state building and was less active in the matter of spreading the borders of the kingdom to the East. According to Dimitri Obolensky, Abkhazia was a client state of the Byzantine Empire in the 10th century, with its ruler bearing the title of exousiastes.

The most prosperous period of the Abkhazian kingdom was between 850 and 950. Beginning with George I (c.864–871), the increasingly expansionist tendencies of the kingdom led to the enlargement of its realm to the east. The Abkhazian kings controlled duchy of Kartli (central and part of eastern Georgia), and interfered in the affairs of the Armenian and Georgian Bagratids. In about 908 King Constantine III (c.894–923) had finally annexed a significant portion of Kartli, bringing his borders close to the Arab-controlled Tbilisi. For a brief period of time, Kakheti and Hereti in eastern Georgia also recognized the Abkhazian suzerainty. Constantine III also tried to extend his influence over Alania by supporting their Christianization. Under his son, George II (c.923–957), the Abkhazian Kingdom reached a climax of power and prestige. George was also known as a promoter of Orthodox Christianity and a patron of Georgian Christian culture. He helped to establish Christianity as an official religion in Alania, winning the thanks of Constantinople. The contemporary Georgian annals knew him as a "builder of churches". George's successors, however, were unable to retain the kingdom's strength and integrity. During the reign of Leon III (c.960–969), Kakheti and Hereti emancipated themselves from the Abkhazian rule. A bitter civil war and feudal revolts which began under Demetrius III (c.969–976) led the kingdom into complete anarchy under the unfortunate Theodosius III the Blind (c.975–978), a weak and inauspicious king.

In the early 10th century the church of the Kingdom of Abkhazia separated from Constantinople and eventually merged with the Iberian church of East Georgia; the Georgian language made progress in Abkhazia and translations of sacred texts were carried out.

=== Unification ===
King Bagrat II of Abkhazia was also King Bagrat III of Georgia from the Bagrationi dynasty.

By that time the hegemony in the South Caucasus had finally passed to the Georgian Bagratids of Tao-Klarjeti. In 978, the Bagratid prince Bagrat, nephew (sister's son) of the heirless Theodosius, occupied the Abkhazian throne with the help of his adoptive father David III of Tao. Bagrat's descent from both Bagratid and Abkhazian dynasties made him an acceptable choice for the nobles of the realm who were growing weary of internecine quarrels. In 1008, Bagrat succeeded on the death of his natural father Gurgen as the "King of the Iberians". Thus, these two kingdoms unified through dynastic succession, in practice laying the foundation for the unified Georgian monarchy, officially styled then as the Kingdom of Georgia.

== Rulers ==
Most Abkhazian kings, with the exception of John and Adarnase of the Shavliani (presumably of Svan origin), came from the dynasty which is sometimes known in modern history writing as the Leonids after the first king Leon, or Anosids, after the prince Anos from whom the royal family claimed their origin. Prince Cyril Toumanoff relates the name of Anos to the later Abkhaz noble family of Anchabadze. By convention, the regnal numbers of the Abkhazian kings continue from those of the archons of Abasgia. There is also some lack of consistency about the dates of their reigns. The chronology below is given as per Toumanoff.

King	Reign	Dynasty
1. Leon II	780–828	Anchabadze
2. Theodosius II	828–855	Anchabadze
3. Demetrius II	855–864	Anchabadze
4. George I	864–871	Anchabadze
5. John (usurper)	871–873	Shavliani
6. Adarnase	887–893	Shavliani
8. Bagrat I	882–894	Anchabadze
9. Constantine III	894–923	Anchabadze
10. George II	923–957	Anchabadze
11. Leon III	957–967	Anchabadze
12. Demetrius III	967–975	Anchabadze
13. Theodosius III	975–978	Anchabadze
14. Bagrat III	978–1008	Bagrationi

== Ethnic composition and historiography ==
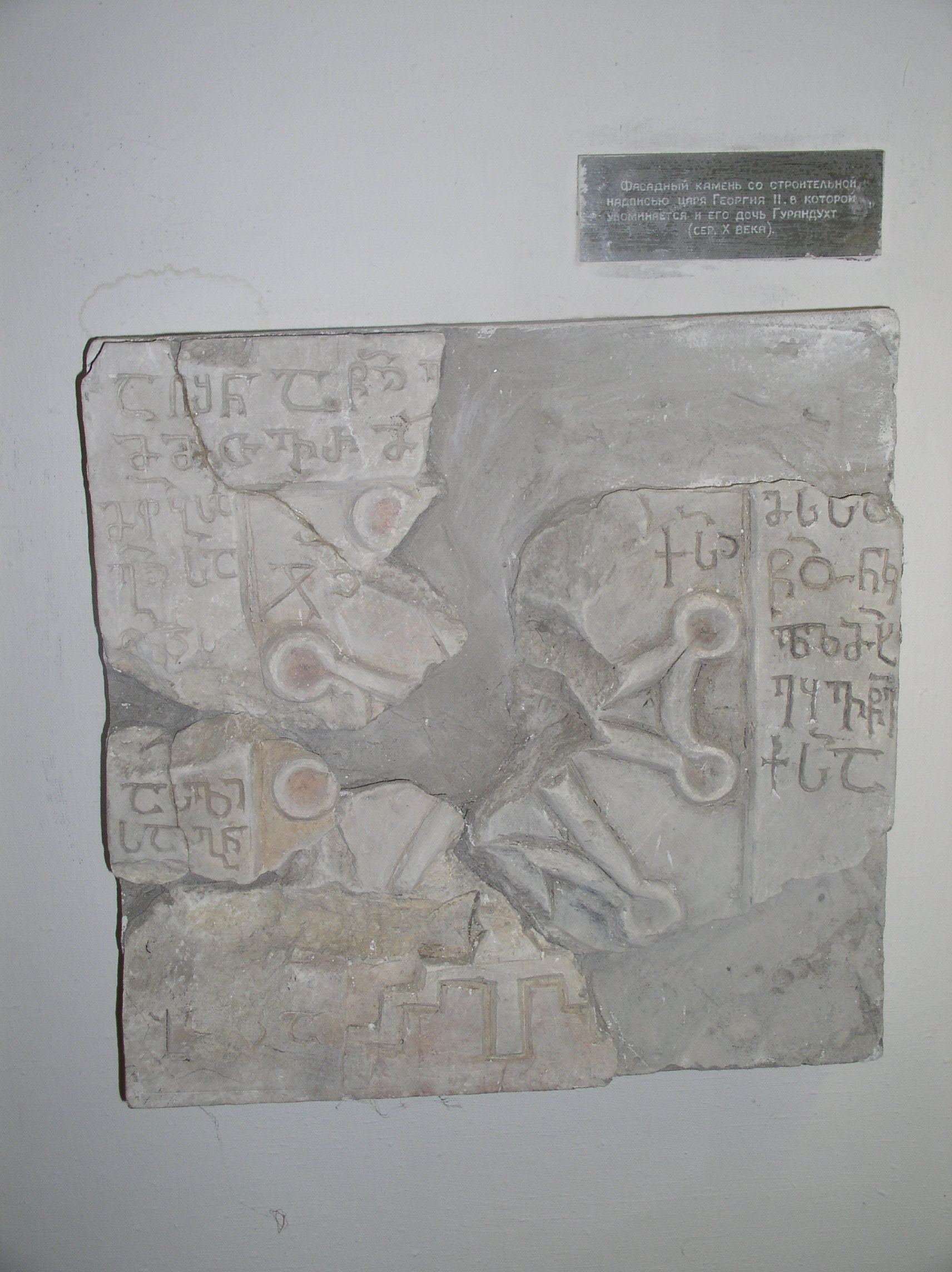
Façade stone of the Khopi Church bearing a Georgian Asomtavruli inscription mentioning George II of Abkhazia and his daughter Gurandukht.

The constitution of the kingdom is presented differently in the Abkhazian and Georgian historiography, with the ethnic composition of the population and the origin of the ruling dynasty being especially contentious.

St. Cyril named both Abasgians and Iberians amongst peoples praying in their own languages according to the 9th century Vita Cyrilli.

For Abkhazian historians, the kingdom of Abkhazia is considered the historical root of the nation and the "1200-year statehood tradition" is emphasised. The dominant Georgian narrative emphasises the joint Georgian-Abkhazian state and the dominant role of the Georgian language and culture.

Most international scholars agree that it is extremely difficult to judge the ethnic identity of the various population segments due primarily to the fact that the terms "Abkhazia" and "Abkhazians" were used in a broad sense during this period—and for some while later—and covered, for all practical purposes, all the population of the kingdom, comprising both the Georgian (including also Mingrelians, Laz, and Svans with their distinct languages that are related to the Georgian language) and Abkhaz (Abasgoi, Apsilae, and Zygii) peoples. According to Abkhaz historian Zurab Anchabadze, although the Kingdom of Abkhazia was a multi-ethnic polity, the Kartvelian tribes constituted a significant majority of the kingdom's population.

It seems likely that a significant proportion of the Georgian-speaking population, combined with a drive of the Abkhazian kings to throw off the Byzantine political and cultural dominance, resulted in Georgian replacing Greek as the language of literacy and culture.

== Gallery ==
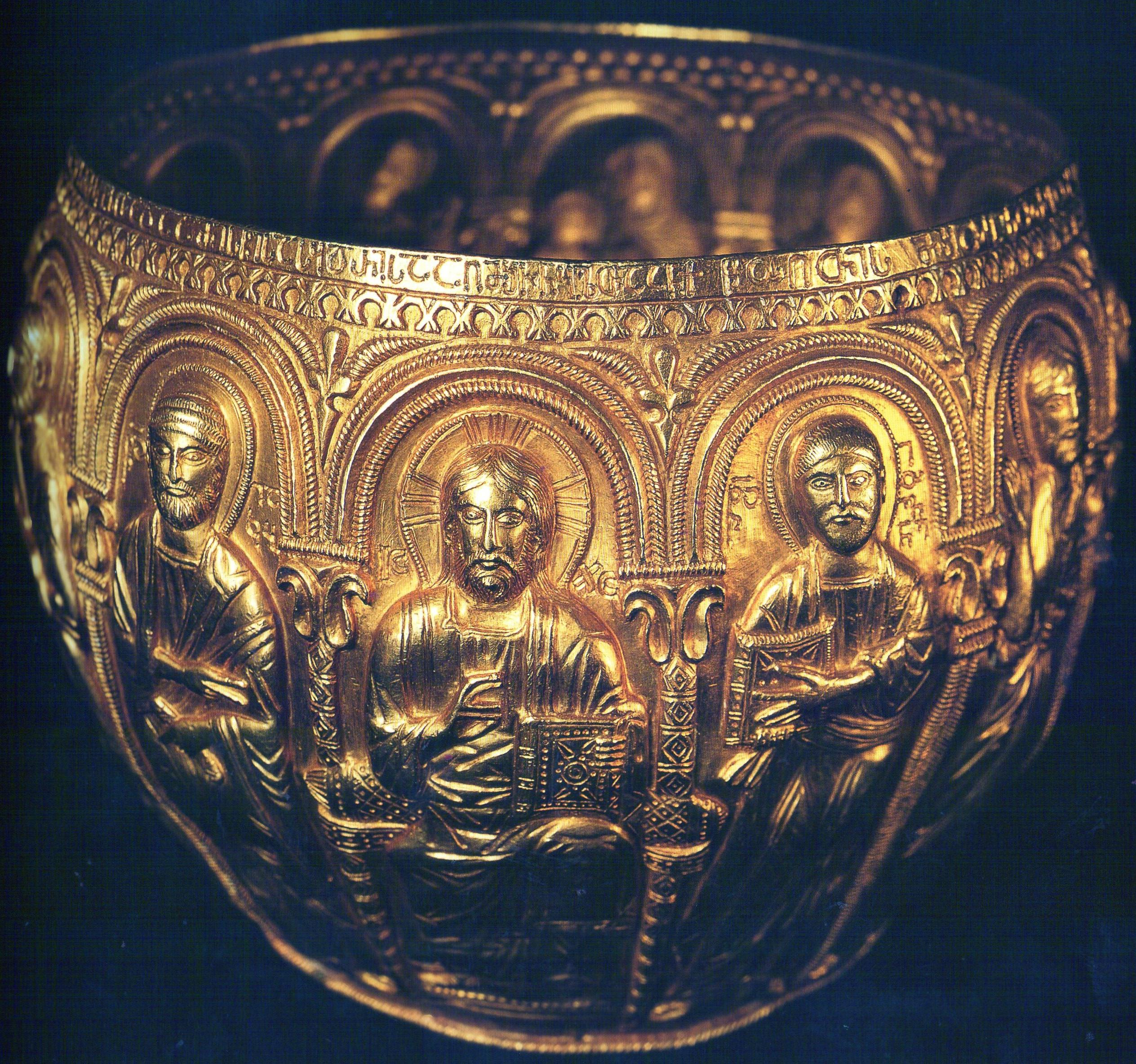
The Bedia Chalice donated by Bagrat to the Bedia Monastery is an important piece of Georgian metal art. c. 999 AD

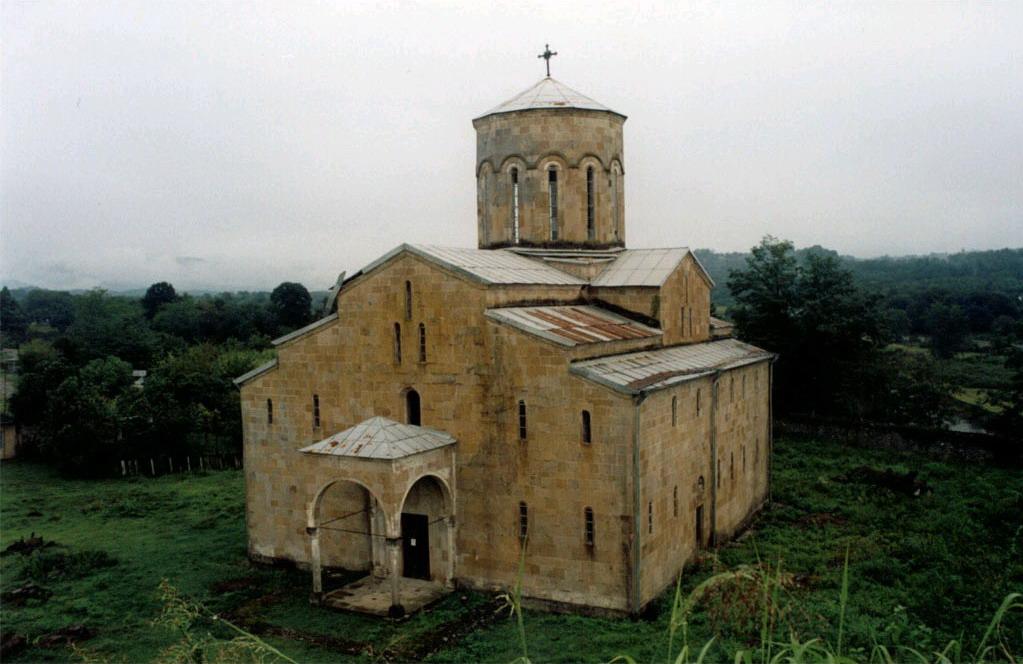
Mokvi Cathedral constructed in 10th century, during the reign of King Leon III of Abkhazia

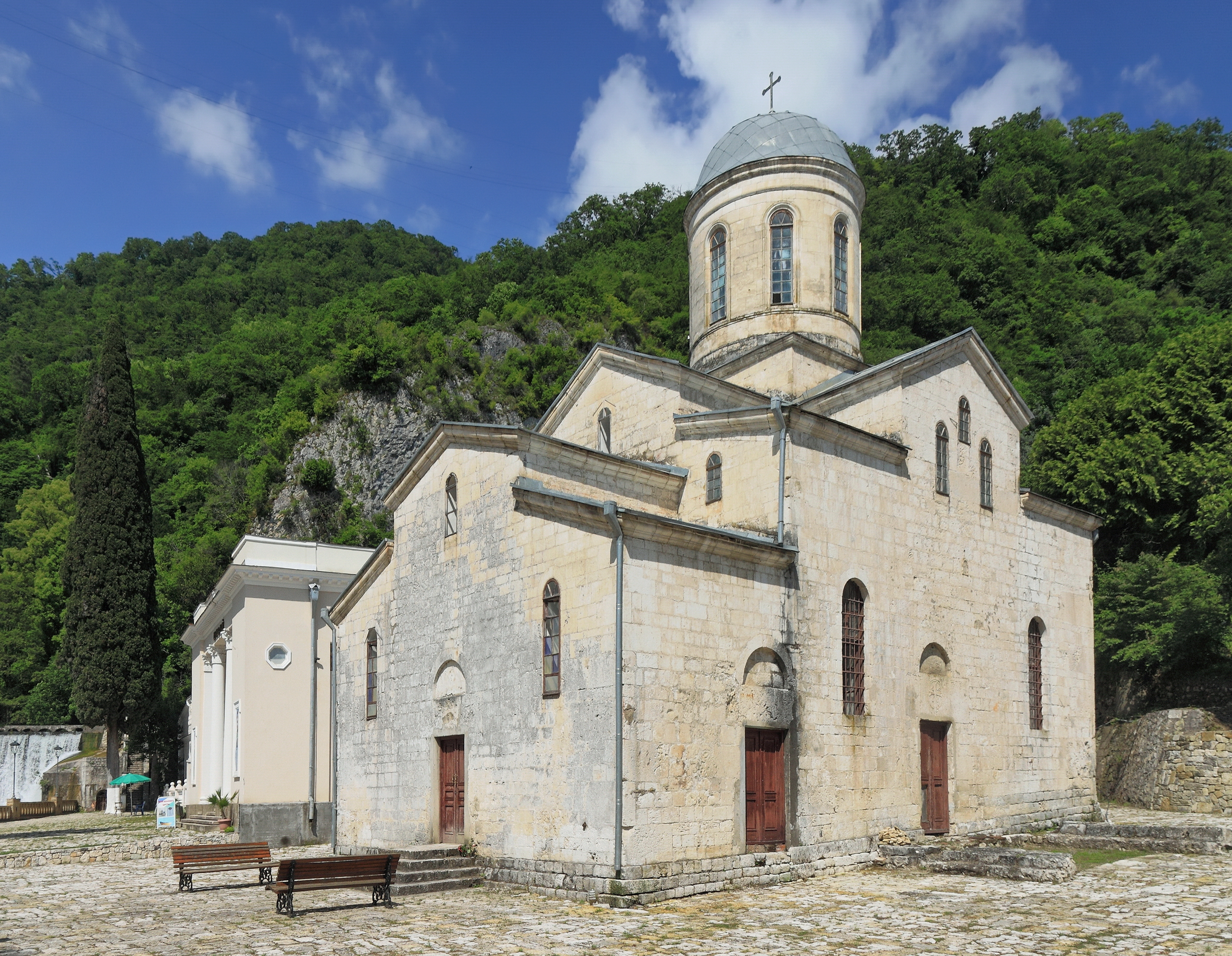
Church of St. Simon the Canaanite constructed between 9-10th century in New Athos

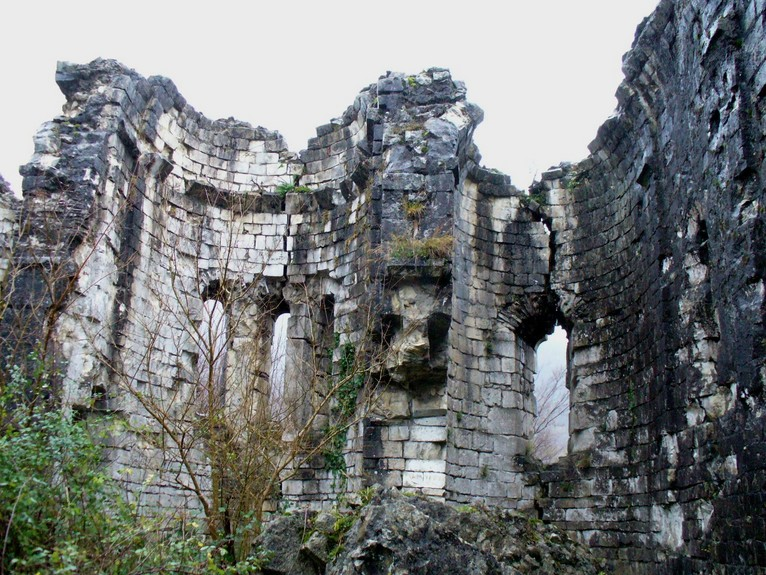
Church of Bzyb constructed in the second half of IX century

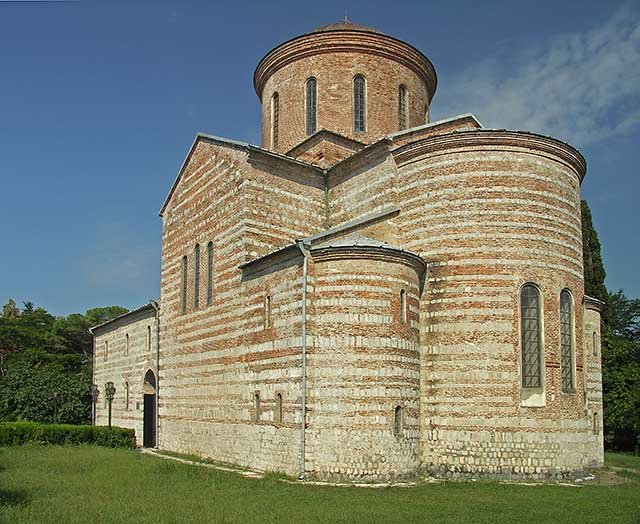
Pitsunda Cathedral was built at the end of the 10th century by King Bagrat III of Georgia.

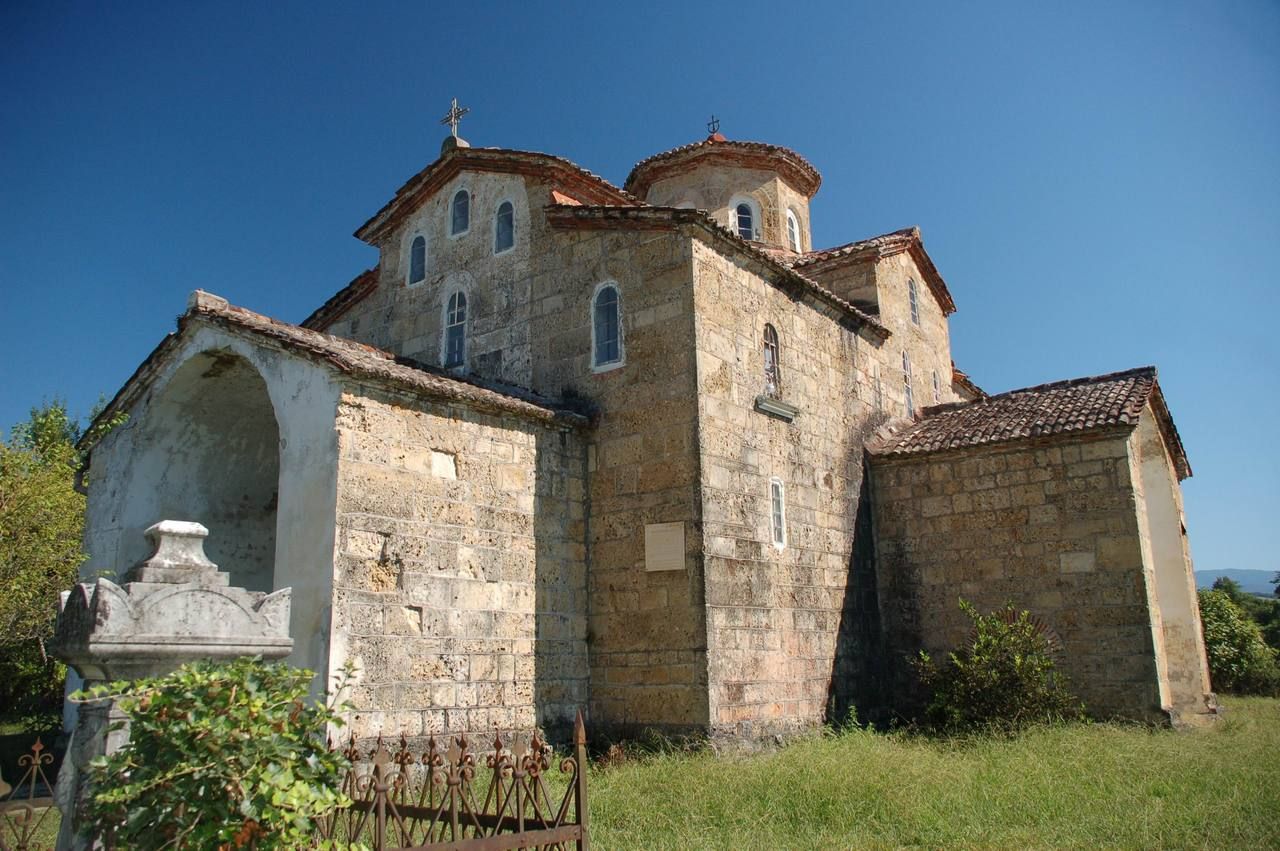
Lykhny Church built in the 10th century.

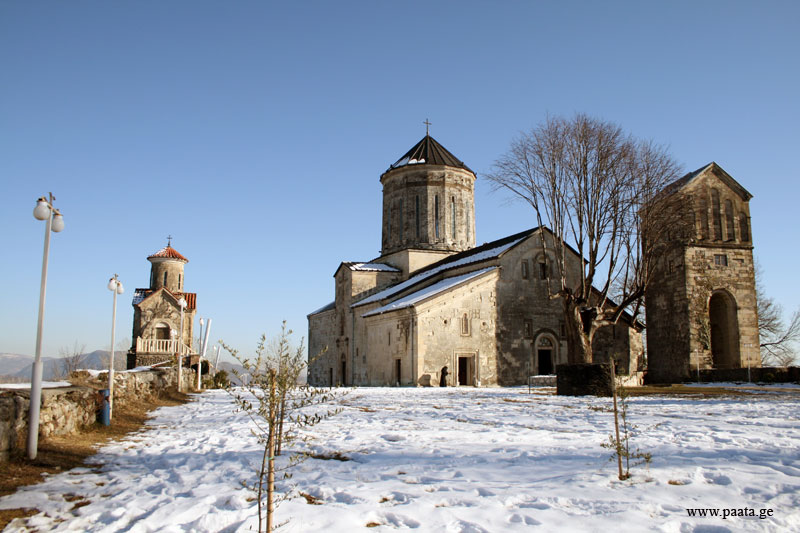
Chkondidi cathedral built by George II, X century

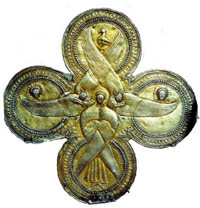
The cross of George II of Abkhazia, X century

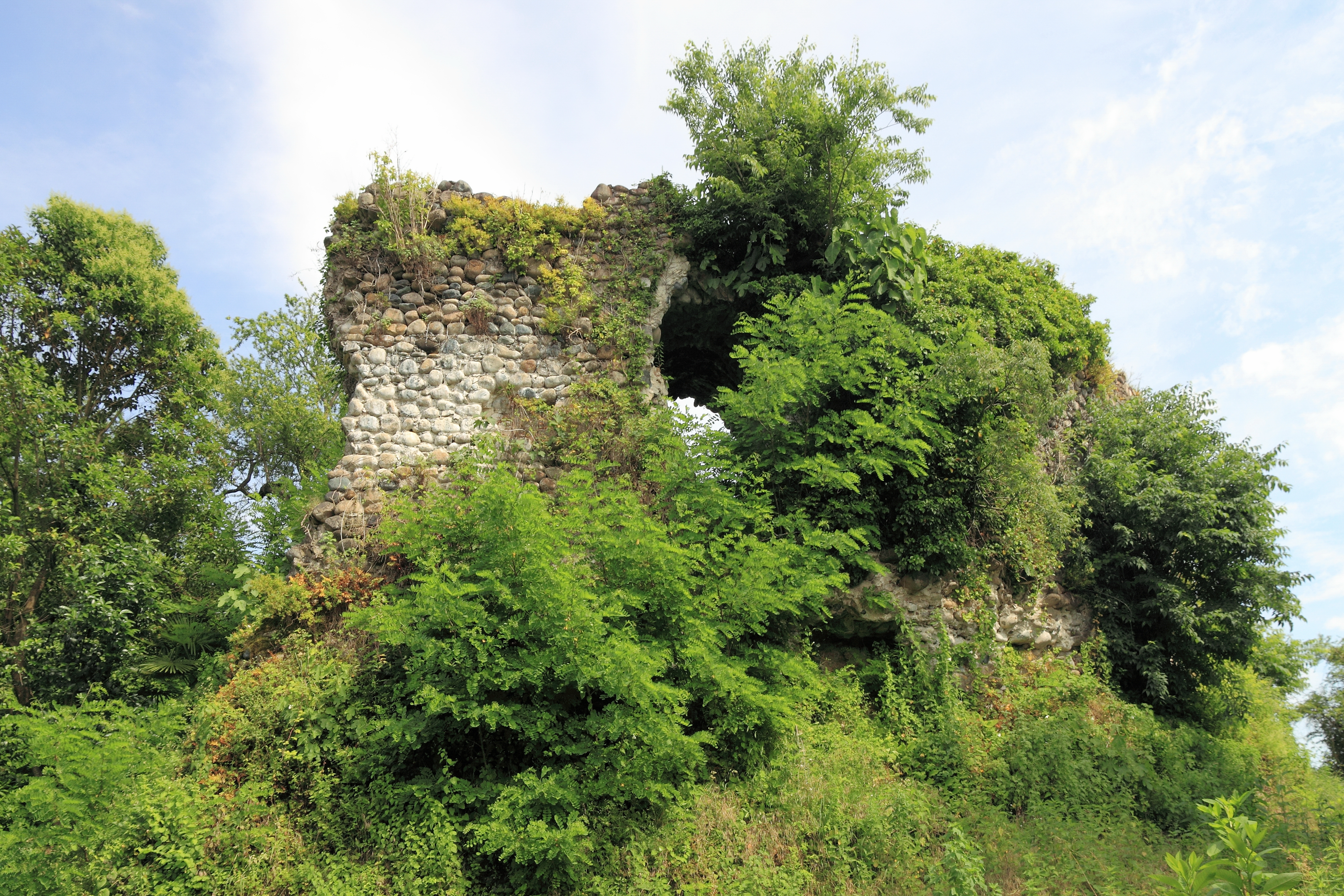
The remains of the Bagrat's Castle.

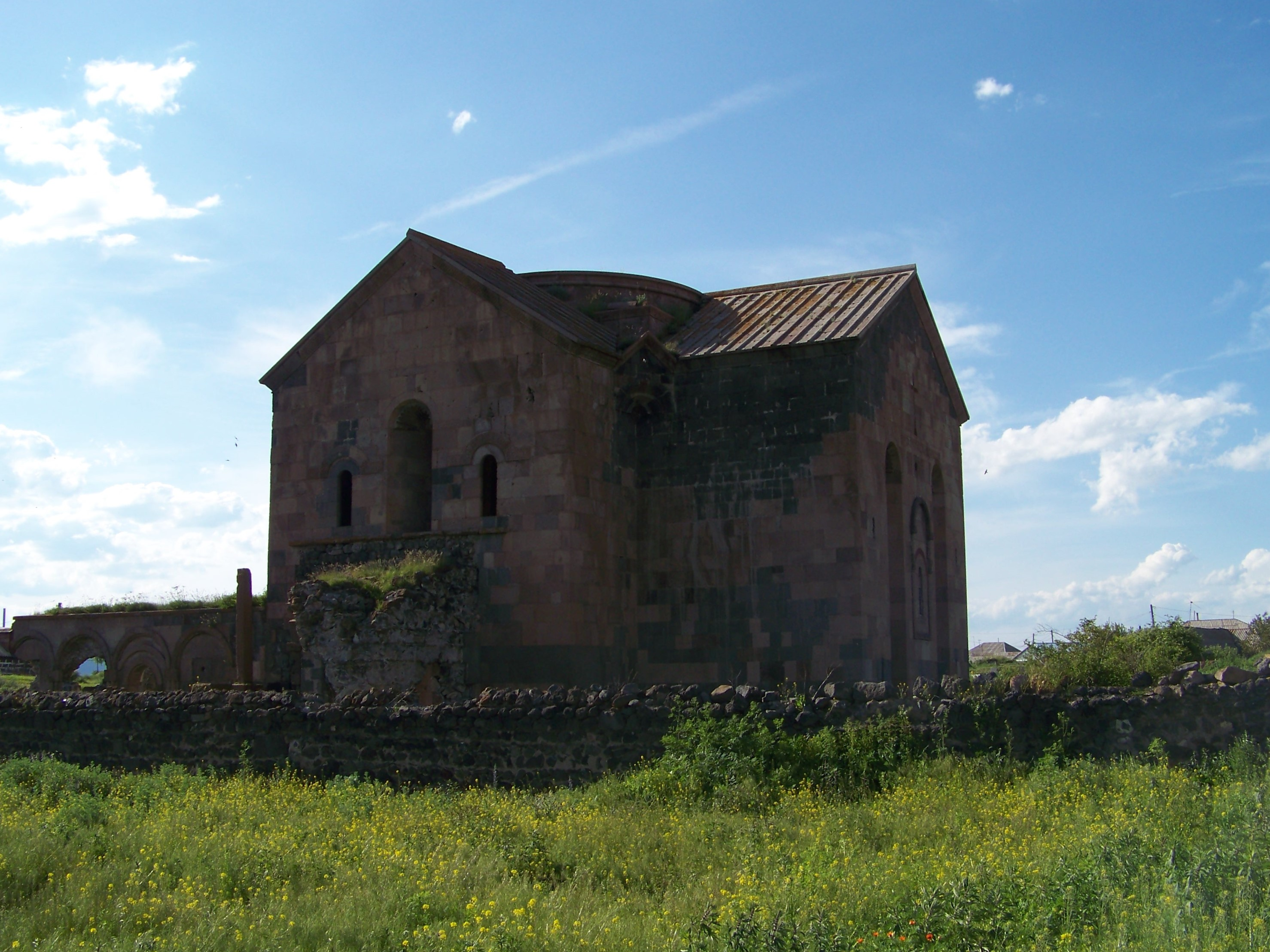
Kumurdo Cathedral was built by Ioane the Bishop during the reign of King Leon III of Abkhazia in 964.

== See also ==
- History of Abkhazia
- Abasgoi

== Bibliography ==
- Zverev, Alexei (1996). "Ethnic Conflicts in the Caucasus 1988–1994". In Coppieters, Bruno (ed.). Contested Borders in the Caucasus. Brussels, Belgium: VUBPress.
- Smith, Graham; Allworth, Edward A.; Law, Vivien A.; Bohr, Annette; Wilson, Andrew (1998). Nation-Building in the Post-Soviet Borderlands: The Politics of National Identities. Cambridge, England: Cambridge University Press. ISBN 0-521-59968-7.
- Encyclopaedia of Islam. Brill.
- Center for Citizen Peacebuilding (2003). "Aspects of the Georgian-Abkhazian Conflict". University of California, Irvine.
- Bagrationi, Vakhushti. The History of the Kingdom of Georgia: The History of Egrisi, Abkhazia or Imereti (in Russian). Vol. 1.
- Rapp, Stephen H. (2003). Studies in Medieval Georgian Historiography: Early Texts and Eurasian Contexts. Peeters. ISBN 90-429-1318-5.
- Gigineishvili, Levan (2003). "Conflicting Narratives in Abkhazia and Georgia: Different Visions of the Same History and the Quest for Objectivity".
- Kitagawa, Seiichi (1996). "The Role of Historiography in the Abkhazo-Georgian Conflict".
- Hewitt, George, ed. (2013). The Abkhazians: A Handbook. Routledge. ISBN 978-1-136-80205-8.
- Mirsky, Georgiy I. (1997). On Ruins of Empire: Ethnicity and Nationalism in the Former Soviet Union. Greenwood Press. ISBN 0-313-30044-5.
- Suny, Ronald Grigor (1994). The Making of the Georgian Nation (2nd ed.). Bloomington, Indiana, USA: Indiana University Press. p. 45. ISBN 0-253-20915-3.
- Thomson, Robert W. (1996). Rewriting Caucasian History: The Medieval Armenian Adaptation of the Georgian Chronicles: The Original Georgian Texts and Armenian Adaptation. Oxford University Press. ISBN 0-19-826373-2.
- Toumanoff, Cyril (1956). "Chronology of the Kings of Abasgia and Other Problems". Le Muséon. 69: 73–90.
- Lortkipanidze, Mariam; Japaridze, Otar; Muskhelishvili, David; Metreveli, Roin (2012). History of Georgia in Four Volumes, Vol. II: History of Georgia from the 4th Century to the 13th Century. Tbilisi, Georgia: National Academy of Sciences of Georgia. ISBN 978-9941-19-585-3.
