= Church of St. Simon the Canaanite, New Athos =

Immovable Cultural Monuments of National Significance of Georgia

Likhni Church Aba-Ata ლიხნის ეკლესია აბა-ათა (in Georgian) Лыхнытәи ауахәама Абаҭаа (in Abkhaz)
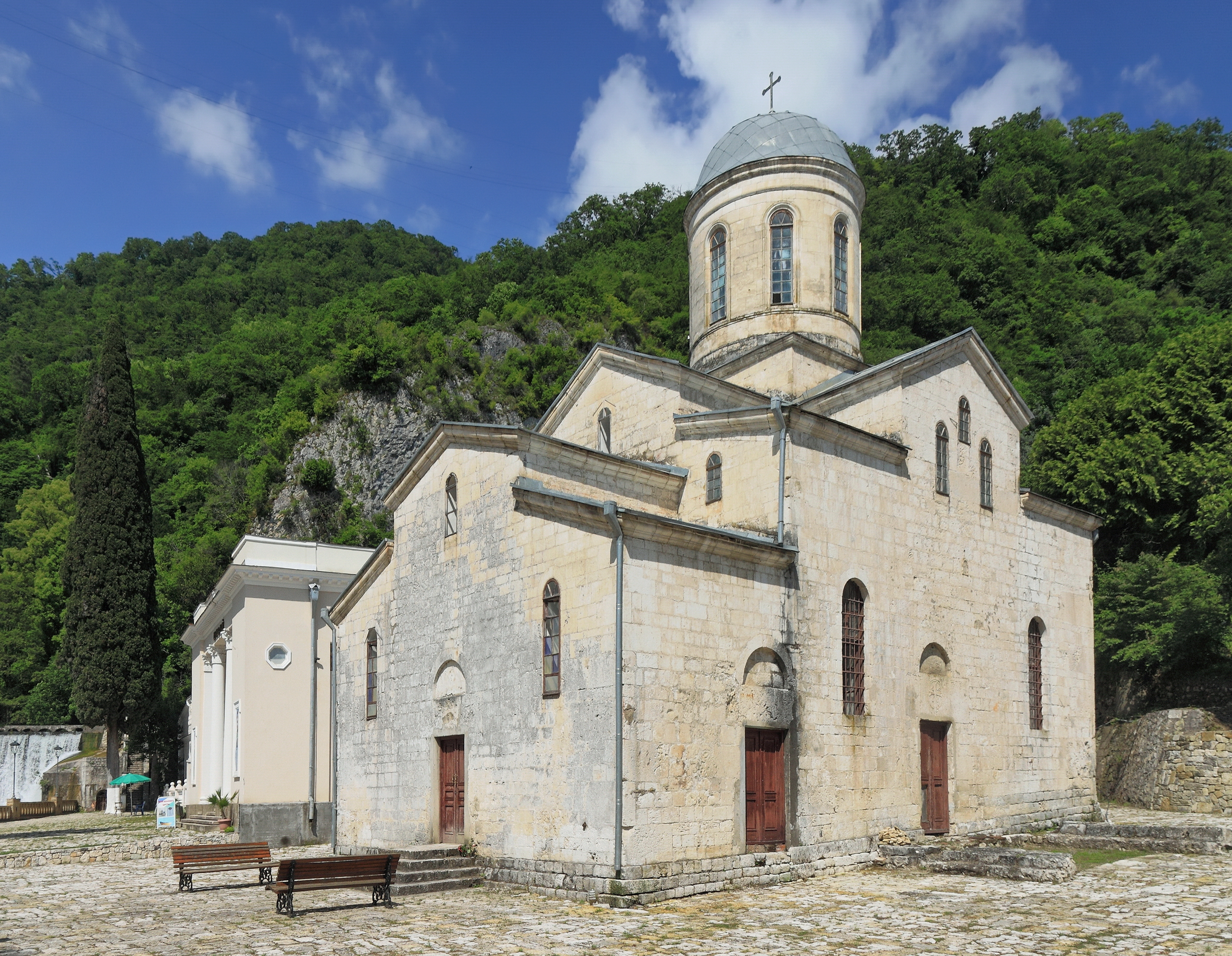
- Church of St. Simon the Canaanite, New Athos

- Location within Abkhazia Location within Georgia

Religion
- Affiliation: Georgian Orthodox
- Province: Abkhazia
- Ecclesiastical or organizational status: ruins

Location
- Location: (Georgia (country)) New Athos, Gudauta District, Abkhazia, Georgia
- Interactive map of Likhni Church Aba-Ata ლიხნის ეკლესია აბა-ათა (in Georgian); Лыхнытәи ауахәама Абаҭаа (in Abkhaz)
- Coordinates: 43°05′26″N 40°48′59″E

Architecture
- Type: Church
- Completed: 9th-10th century
- Materials

Immovable Cultural Monument of National Significance of Georgia
- Official name: Church of St. Simon the Canaanite
- Designated: November 7, 2006; 19 years ago
- Reference no.: 3548
- Item Number in Cultural Heritage Portal: 9282
- Date of entry in the registry: March 30, 2006; 20 years ago

The Church of St. Simeon the Canaanite (Georgian: წმინდა სვიმონ კანანელის სახელობის ტაძარი) is located near the town of New Athos in Gudauta District, Abkhazia/Georgia, dating from the 9th or 10th century. Not to be confused with St Simon the Canaanite Basilica in Psirtskha village.

== History ==
The church is dedicated to St. Simon the Canaanite, who, according to the 11th-century Georgian Chronicles, preached Christianity in Abkhazia and Egrisi and died and was buried at the town of Nicopsia, to the north of Abkhazia. A nearby grotto is associated by popular legends with the site of martyrdom of St. Simon.

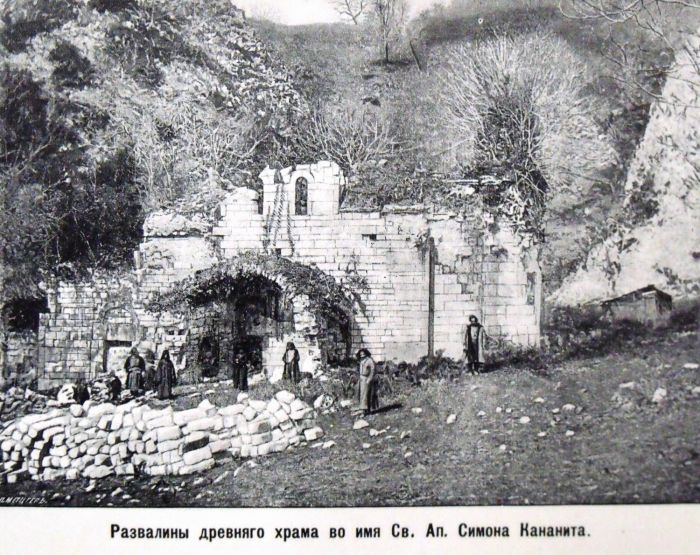
The church before the 1880s reconstruction

The design of the extant church dates to the 9th or 10th century and is influenced by the Byzantine and Georgian art traditions, but the church site seems to be two centuries older. At the time when the Georgian historian Dimitri Bakradze visited it in the 1850s, the church was abandoned, but still standing except for the collapsed dome. The church suffered greatly when the local landlord, Major Hasan Margani removed its blocks of stone for the construction of his own mansion. Later, in the 1880s, the church was reconstructed, using blocks of white hewn stone, to its current state. The church is adorned with images of Christian symbols such as a fish, lion, and cross curved in relief.

== Current condition ==
Georgia has inscribed the church on its list of cultural heritage and treats it as part of cultural heritage in the Russian-occupied territories with no known current state of condition.
