= Abasgia =

Former monarchy in Europe

Abasgia Αβασγοί აბაზგეთი (Abazgeti)
- 64–786
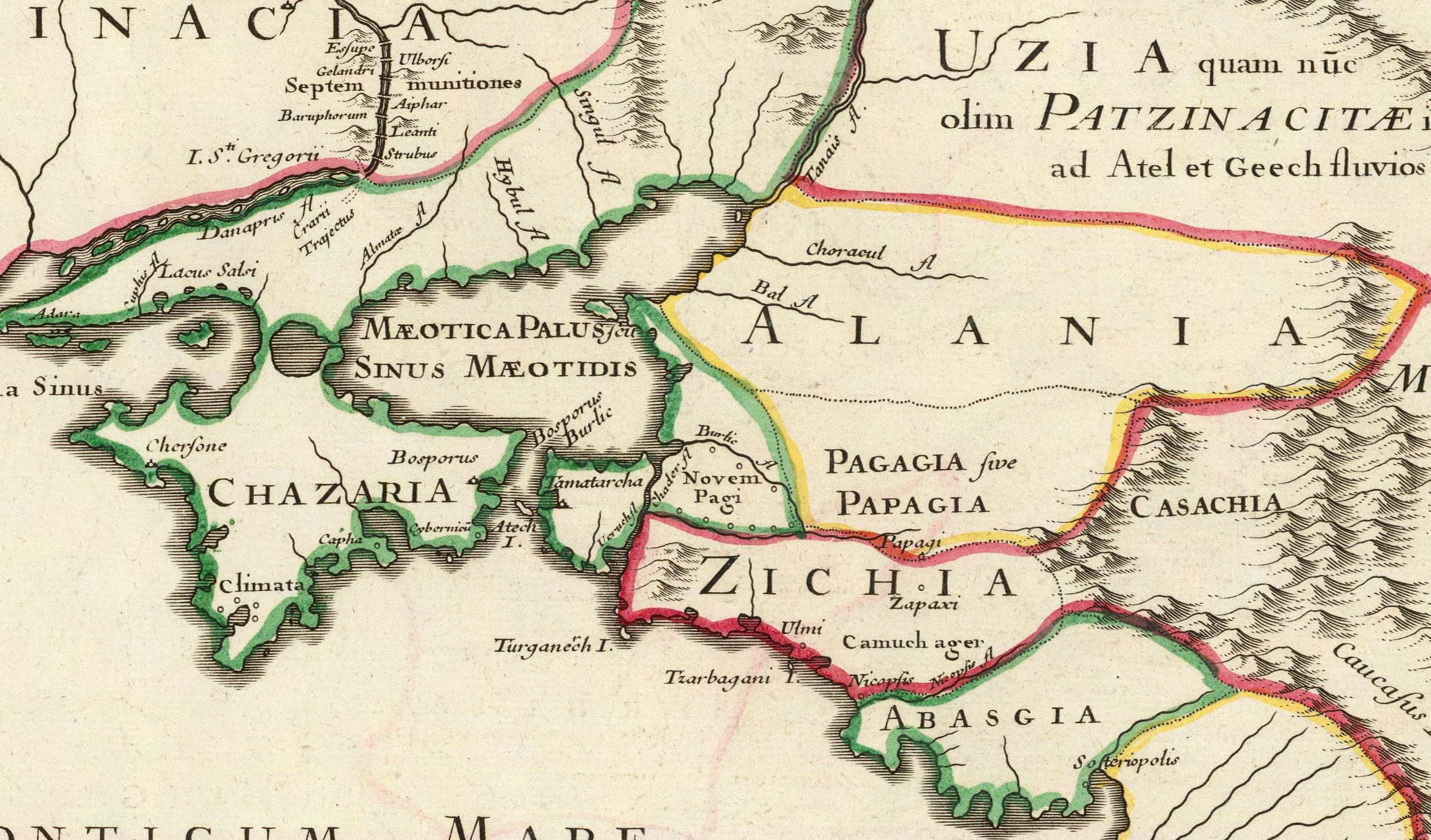
- Capital: Anacopia
- Religion: Chalcedonian Christianity
- Government: Kingdom; Princedom
  - c. 100s c. 300s c. 510s c. 530s c. 550s c. 600s c. 700s c. 720s c. ? c. ? c. 730s c. 740s: Resmag; Rigvadin; Anos; Gozar; Opsit; Justinian; Baruk; Dmitry I Feodosy; Fedor; Constantine I Leon I
- History
  - Established: 64
  - Disestablished: 786
Preceded by	Succeeded by
Colchis; Lazica	Kingdom of Abkhazia

Abasgia (Ancient Greek: Ἀβασγία) was a medieval principality in the Caucasus. Originally a part of the Kingdom of Lazica, it became a predecessor of the Kingdom of Abkhazia.

== History ==
The rulers of Abasgia were appointed by the kings of Lazica, probably upon the approval of the Byzantine emperor.

By the 4th century, Abasgia had shifted to the north and occupied territory between Gumista and Bzyb rivers. In 542, the Byzantine army left Abasgia, and around 548, Abasg Euphrates arrived in Abasgia as the Byzantine ambassador, after which Christianity became the official religion in Abasgia, but did not become widespread among the inhabitants.

During the Persian-Byzantine wars, the Abasgians supported the Sasanids, hoping to free themselves from the power of Byzantium. Thus, in 550, Abasgia was involved in an uprising against Byzantium. The result of the uprising was the division of Abasgia into two parts — the eastern, whose ruler became Skeparn, and the western, whose ruler became Opsit. Skeparn soon received the support of the Sasanian court, and Opsit prepared for defense against the Byzantine troops under the command of Vilgand and John the Armenian. The following year, the Byzantines forcibly restored their power in Abasgia. During the Lazian Wars, the Byzantines built the fortresses of Sebastopolis and Pitiunt. The Byzantine government relied on a system of fortresses, the loyalty of the local nobility and the church organization.

In the course of the Lazian wars the kingdom of Lazica disintegrated and eventually was incorporated into Byzantium while the Abasgians achieved a degree of autonomy. At the end of the 8th century, taking advantage of internal upheavals in the empire, the Abasgians, with the help of the Khazar Khaganate, freed themselves from the power of Byzantium, since that time power has passed from the Anosid dynasty to the new Leonid dynasty, who later assumed the title of King of Abkhazia.

== Religion ==
In the mid-6th century, during the reign of Byzantine Emperor Justinian I, Abasgoi were converted to Christianity, although according to the Byzantine historian Procopius of Caesarea, pagan beliefs were still strong among them. According to Evagrius Scholasticus, Justinian built a church of the Virgin Mary in Abasgia and appointed priests for them.
