= New Athos =

New Athos ახალი ათონი, Афон Ҿыц, Новый Афон, Νέος Άθως Akhali Atoni, Afon Ch'yts, Novy Afon, Neos Athos
- Town
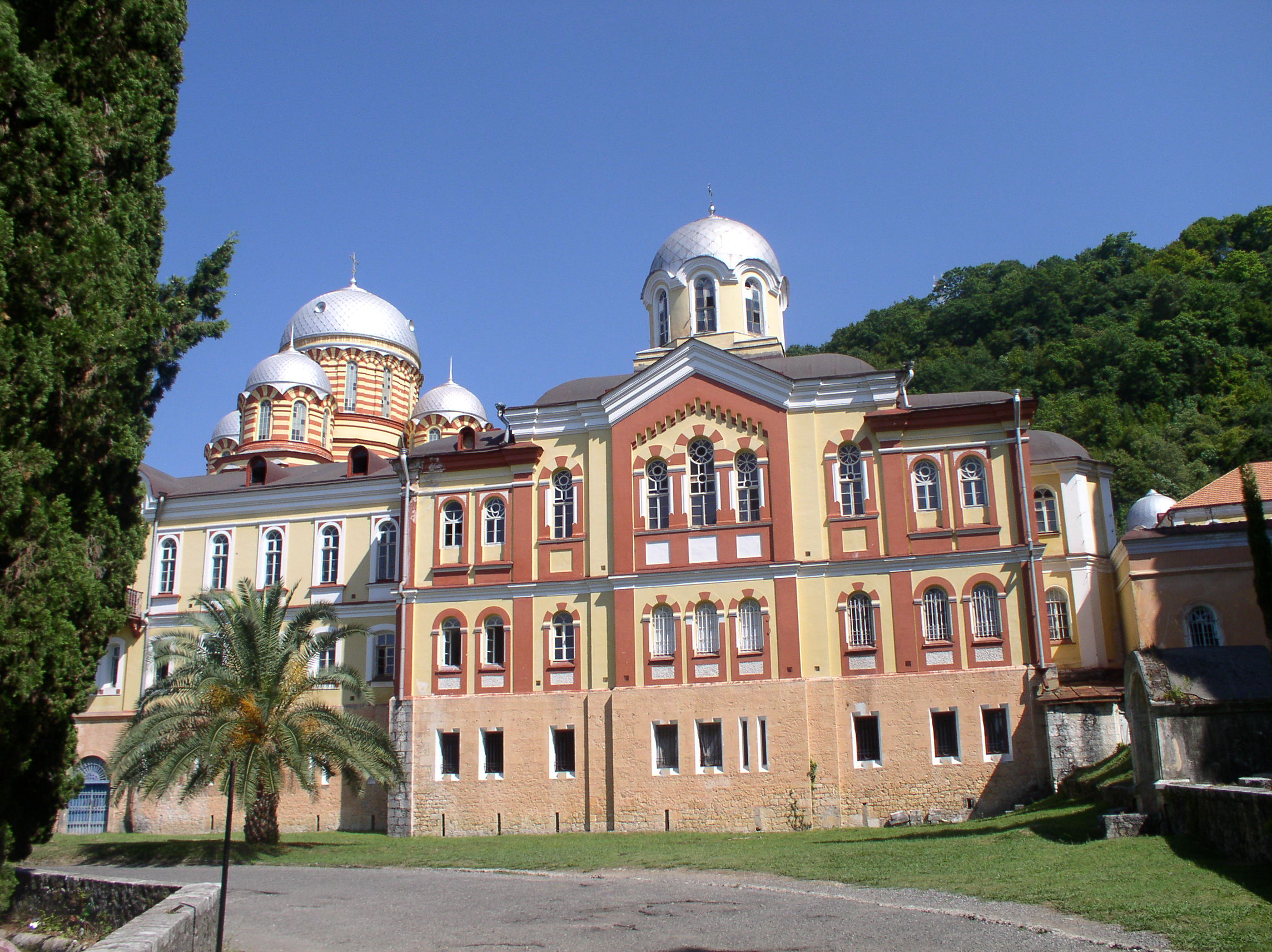
- New Athos Monastery

- Coat of arms

- Location of New Athos in Abkhazia

- Location within Georgia Location within Abkhazia
- Coordinates: 43°05′3.3″N 40°49′2.64″E
- Country: Georgia
- Partially recognized independent country: Abkhazia (Note: The political status of Abkhazia is disputed. Having unilaterally declared independence from Georgia in 1992, Abkhazia is formally recognised as an independent state by 4 UN member states (three other states previously recognised it but then withdrew their recognition), while the remainder of the international community recognizes it as de jure Georgian territory. Georgia continues to claim the area as its own territory, designating it as Russian-occupied territory.)
- District: Gudauta
- Established: 6th century BC

Government
  - Mayor: Feliks Dautia

Population (2011)
  - Total: 1,518
- Time zone: UTC+3 (MSK)
  - Summer (DST): UTC+4

New Athos or Akhali Atoni (Note: Georgian: ახალი ათონი; Abkhaz: Афон Ҿыц, romanized: Afon Ch'yts; Russian: Новый Афон, romanized: Novy Afon; Greek: Νέος Άθως, romanized: Neos Athos) is a town in the Gudauta Municipality of Abkhazia situated some 22 km (14 mi) from Sokhumi by the shores of the Black Sea. The town was previously known under the Greek names Nikopol, Acheisos, Anakopia, Nikopia, Nikofia, Nikopsis, Absara, and later Psyrtskha.

New Athos Cave is one of Abkhazia's tourist attractions.

== History ==
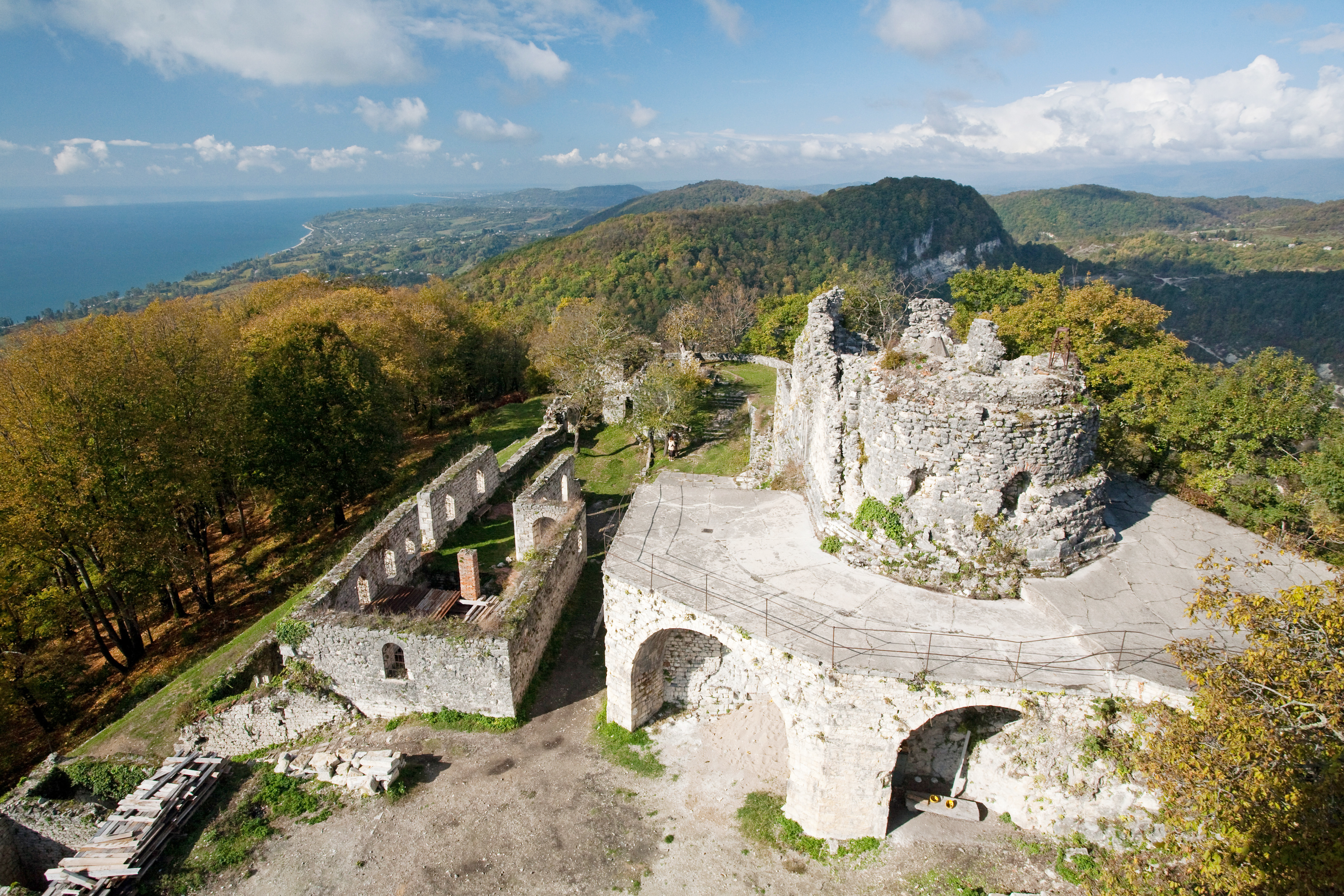
Anakopia fortress

The excavations at the Anakopia Fortress which is located at the edge of the town showed that it functioned in the 5–12 centuries AD, though some archeologists date the construction of the defences to 7th century. Anakopia is associated with the fortress of Tracheia mentioned by Prokopius. Anakopia was the capital of the Abkhazian princedom in the orbit of the Byzantine Empire and then of the Abkhazian Kingdom after the archon Leon II declared himself a king in the late 8th century. Later, the capital was moved to Kutaisi.

Anakopia was ceded to Byzantine Empire by Demetre in 1033 but was retaken by Georgians in 1072 among the other territories Georgia gained as a result of the Empire's defeat at Manzikert at the hands of Seljuks.

According to a tradition Simon the Zealot died in Abkhazia having come there on a missionary trip and was buried in Nicopsis. His remains were transferred to Anakopia in the 14–15 centuries.

== Geography ==
Located between the Black Sea and the Iverian Mountain, New Athos is 17 km far from Gudauta, 22 from Sukhumi and 84 from the Russian borders at Vesyoloye, a village near the city of Sochi.

== Administration ==
Vitali Smyr was reappointed as Mayor on 10 May 2001 following the March 2001 local elections.

On 8 May 2003, Smyr was appointed Minister for Agriculture and released as Mayor of New Athos. On 19 May, Feliks Dautia was appointed his successor.

=== List of mayors ===
| # | Name | Entered office | Left office | President | Comments |
Heads of the Town Administration:
| | Vitali Smyr | 1995 | 8 May 2003 | Vladislav Ardzinba | |
| | Feliks Dautia | 19 May 2003 | 12 February 2005 | Vladislav Ardzinba | |
| | Feliks Dautia | 12 February 2005 | 29 May 2011 | Sergei Bagapsh | |
| | Feliks Dautia | 29 May 2011 | Present | Alexander Ankvab | |

== Symbols ==
The town has a coat of arms, which is featured on some government banners.

== Main sights ==
=== Monastery ===
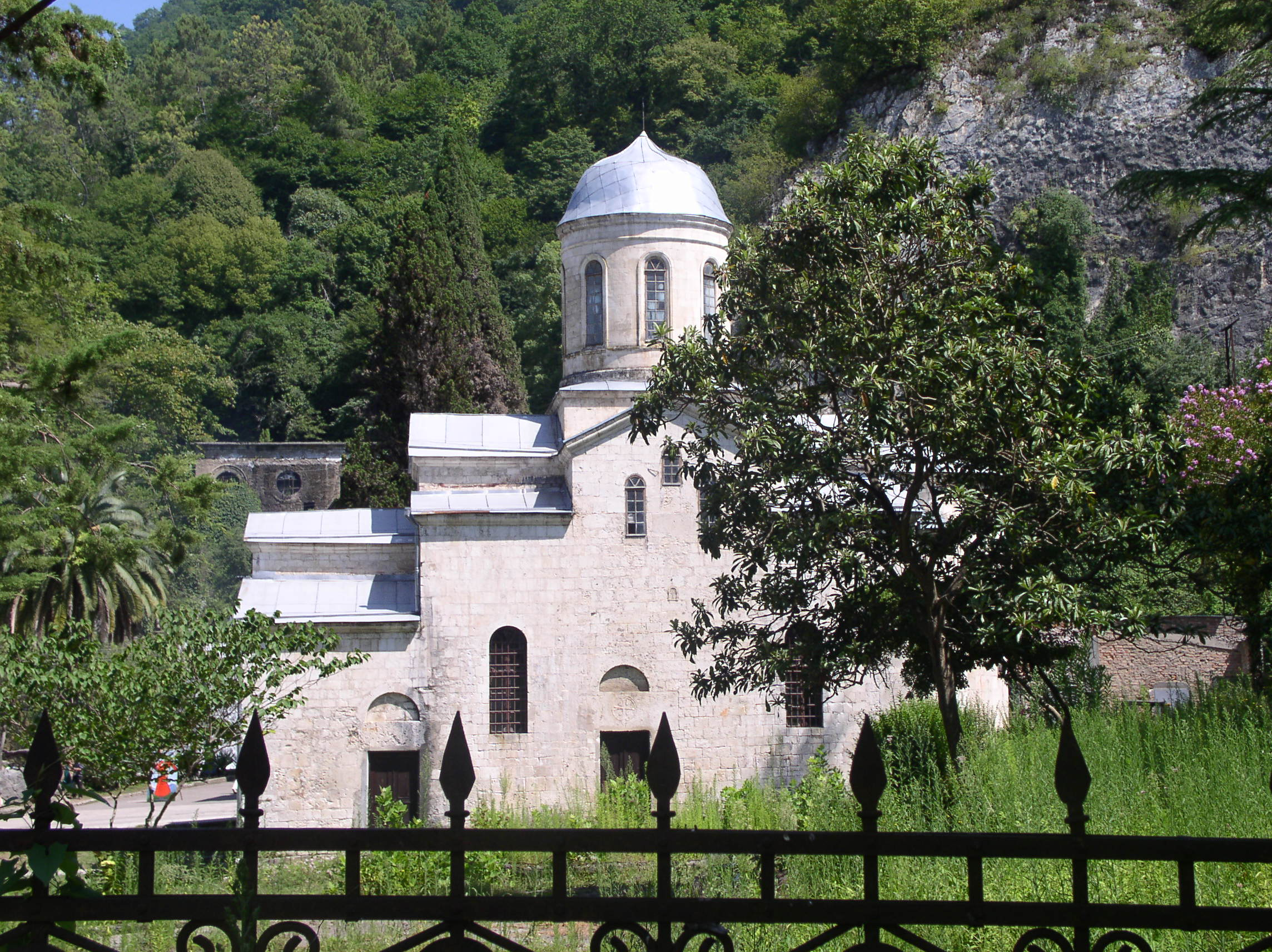
St. Simon the Canaanite church in the New Athos (VI–VIII cc.)

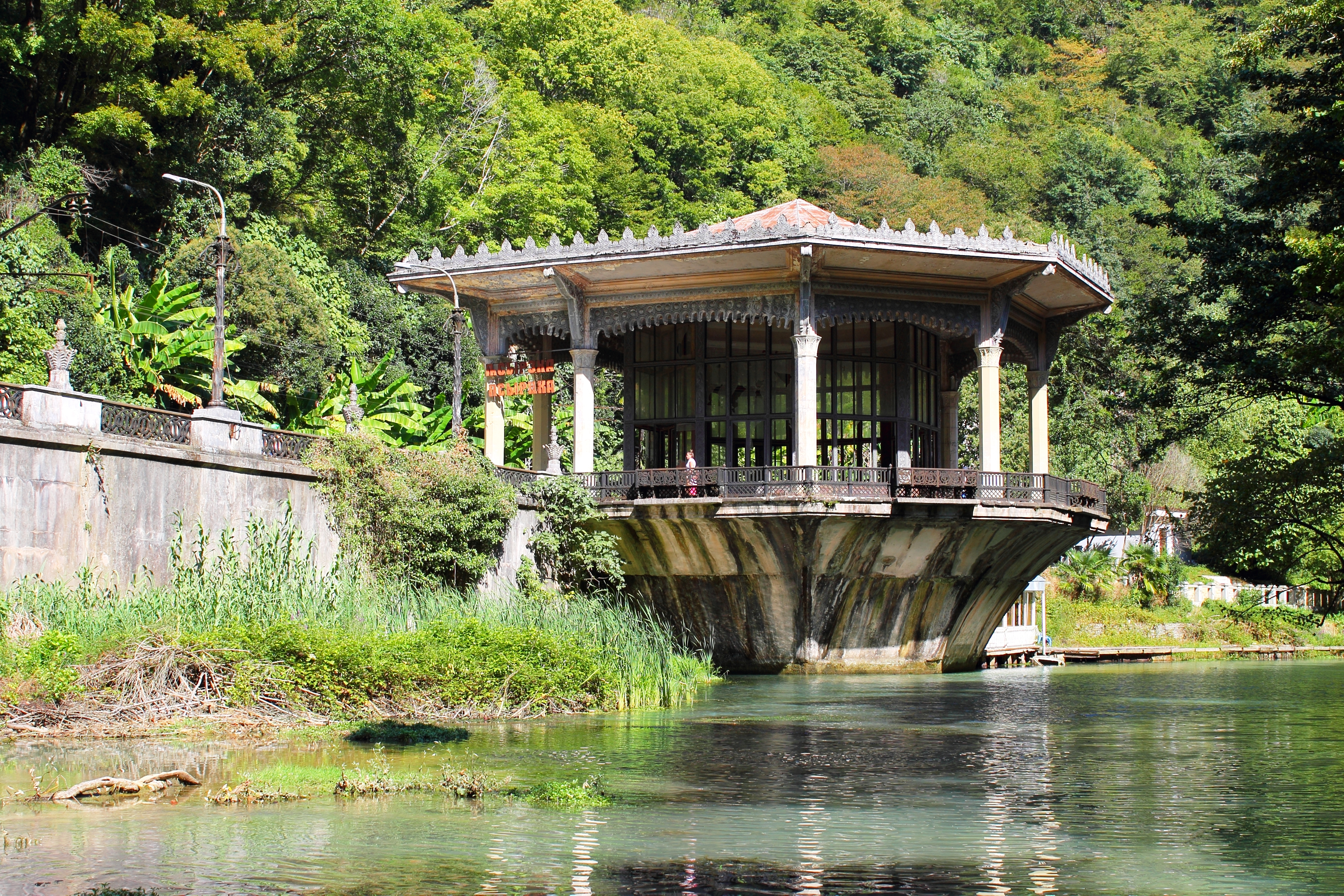
Psyrtskha railway station

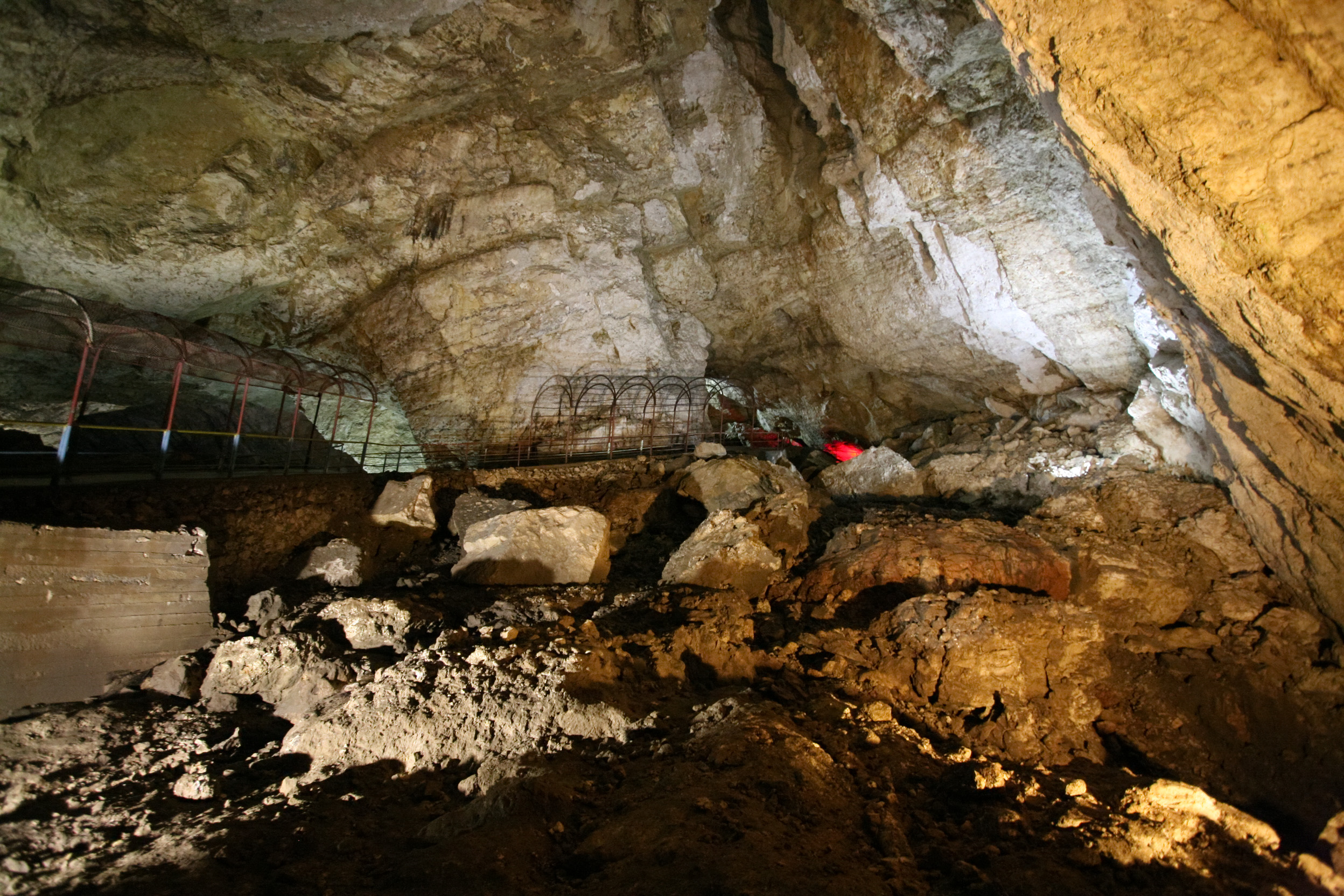
New Athos Cave

In 1874 Russian monks from the overcrowded Rossikon Monastery on Mount Athos arrived to the Caucasus in order to find a place for possible resettlement. They feared that the Ottoman Empire would oust the Russians from Athos after the outbreak of the impending Russo-Turkish War. They selected Psyrtskha, and the Neo-Byzantine New Athos Monastery, dedicated to St. Simon the Canaanite, was constructed there in the 1880s with funds provided by Tsar Alexander III of Russia. Eventually Russian monks were permitted to stay in the "old" Athos, and the New Athos monastery had much less occupancy than anticipated.

In 1924, during the Soviet persecution of religion, the monastery was closed. It was later used as a storage facility, tourist base, hospital and museum. Its return to the Orthodox Church began in 1994, after the end of the war in Abkhazia.

The scenic setting of the New Athos monastery by the sea has made it a popular destination with Russian tourists visiting Abkhazia. An older church of St. Simon the Canaanite, dated to the 9th-10th century and reconstructed in the 1880s, is located near the town, on the Psyrtskha stream.

=== Hydroelectric power station ===
New Athos has a small hydroelectric power station and artificial lake on the Psyrtskha river, close to the old Church of St. Simon the Canaanite. The station was built by the monks of the monastery between 1892 and 1903 and repaired in 1922. It remained broken for over forty years before being repaired again – it was re-opened on 4 June 2012. It produces an estimated 100 kW "per hour [sic]" for the monastery which still owns it.

=== Cave ===
New Athos cave is a karst cave in the Iverian Mountain, few km far from the town. Since 1975 it is served by the New Athos Cave Railway.

== Twin towns – sister cities ==
New Athos is twinned with:

- Sergiyev Posad, Russia
- Sarov, Russia
- Ryazan, Russia

== See also ==
- Mount Athos
