= Iverian Mountain =

Hill in New Athos, Abkhazia, Georgia

Iverian
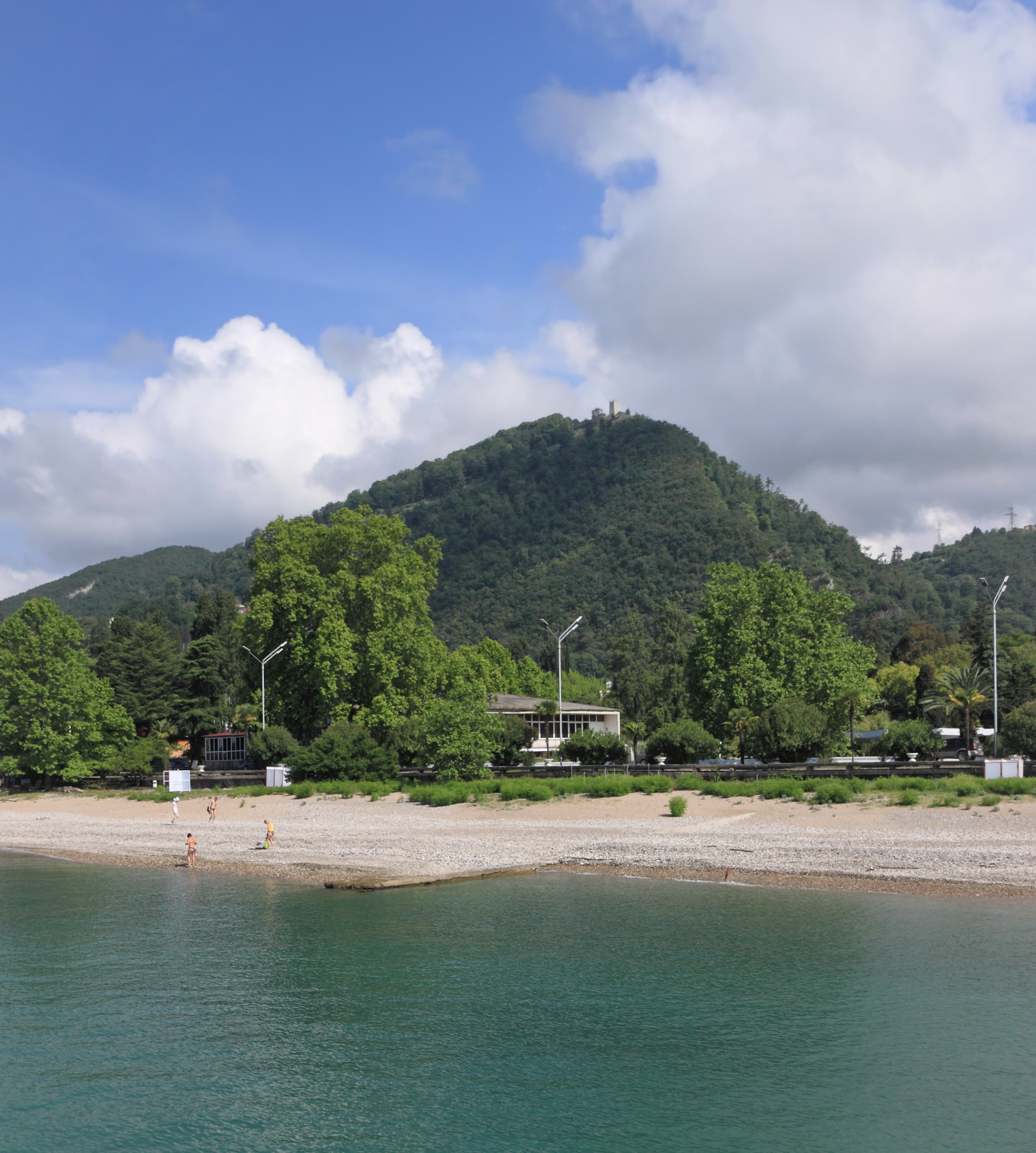
- View of the mountain

Highest point
- Elevation: 344 m (1,129 ft)
- Coordinates: 43°06′N 40°48′E

Geography
- Location within Georgia Location within Abkhazia
- Location: Abkhazia

Iverian Mountain or Iberian Mountain is a 344-meter (1129 feet) high hill in New Athos, Abkhazia, Georgia. There are ruins of the ancient capital of Abkhazia, Anakopia, on the mountain top. On the mountain northern slope New Athos Cave is located. From the top of Iverian Mountain a scenic view of the Black Sea coast from Bichvinta Cape to Sokhumi opens.

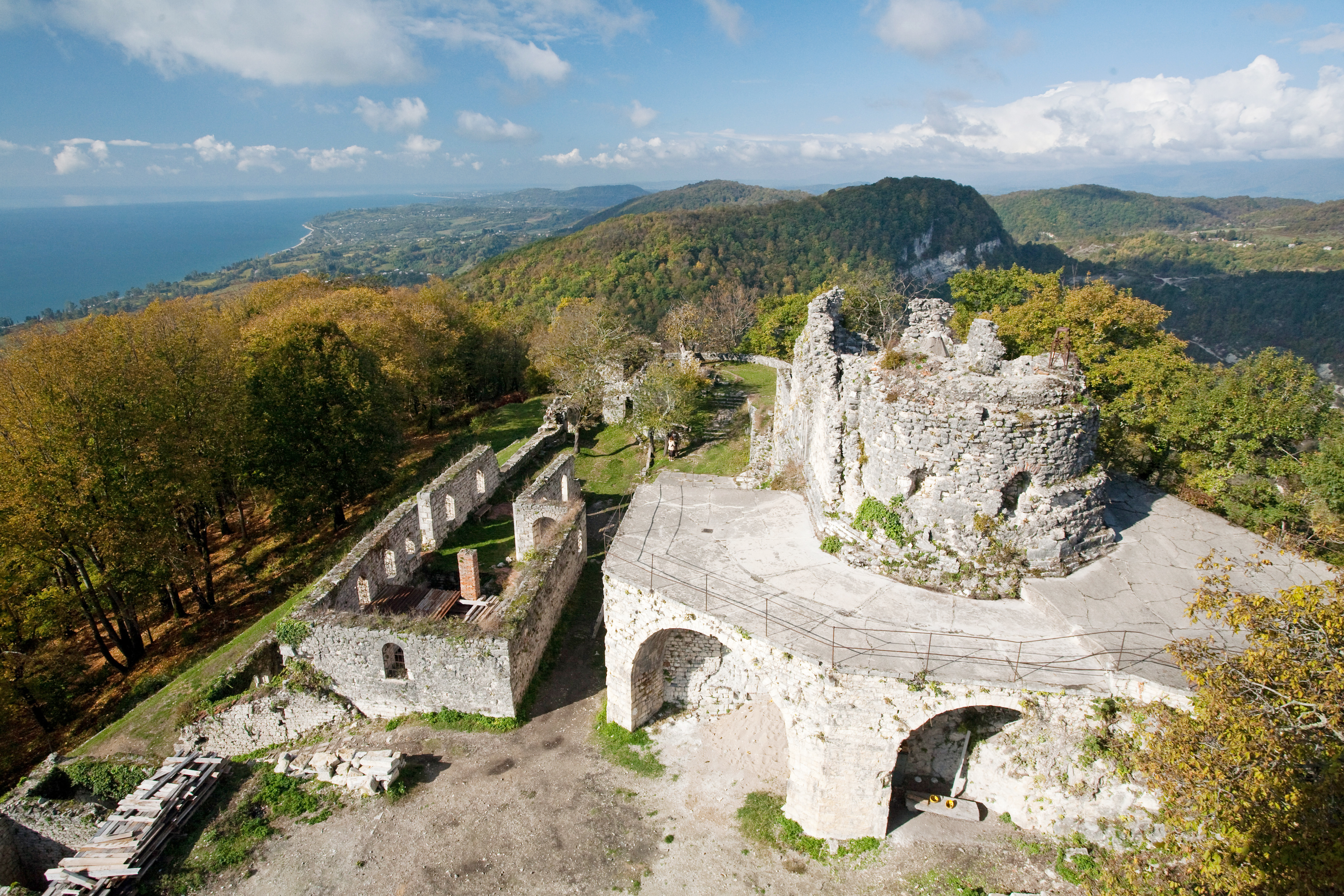
Anakopia fortress.

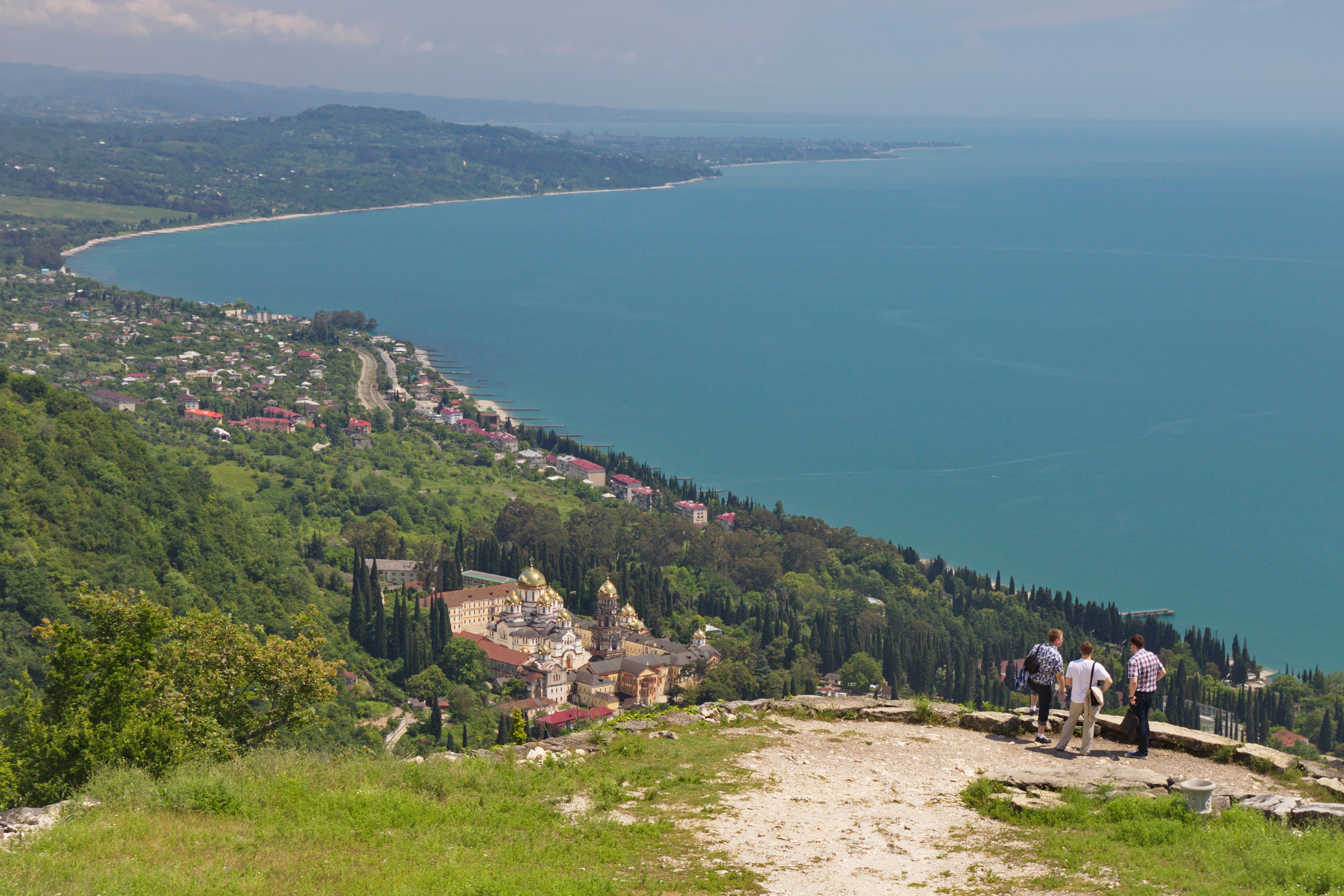
View from the top of Iverian Mountain

== See also ==
- Anakopia
- New Athos
- New Athos Cave Railway
