= Anakopia Fortress =

Ancient citadel in New Athos, Georgia

- Located in New Athos, Abkhazia, Georgia
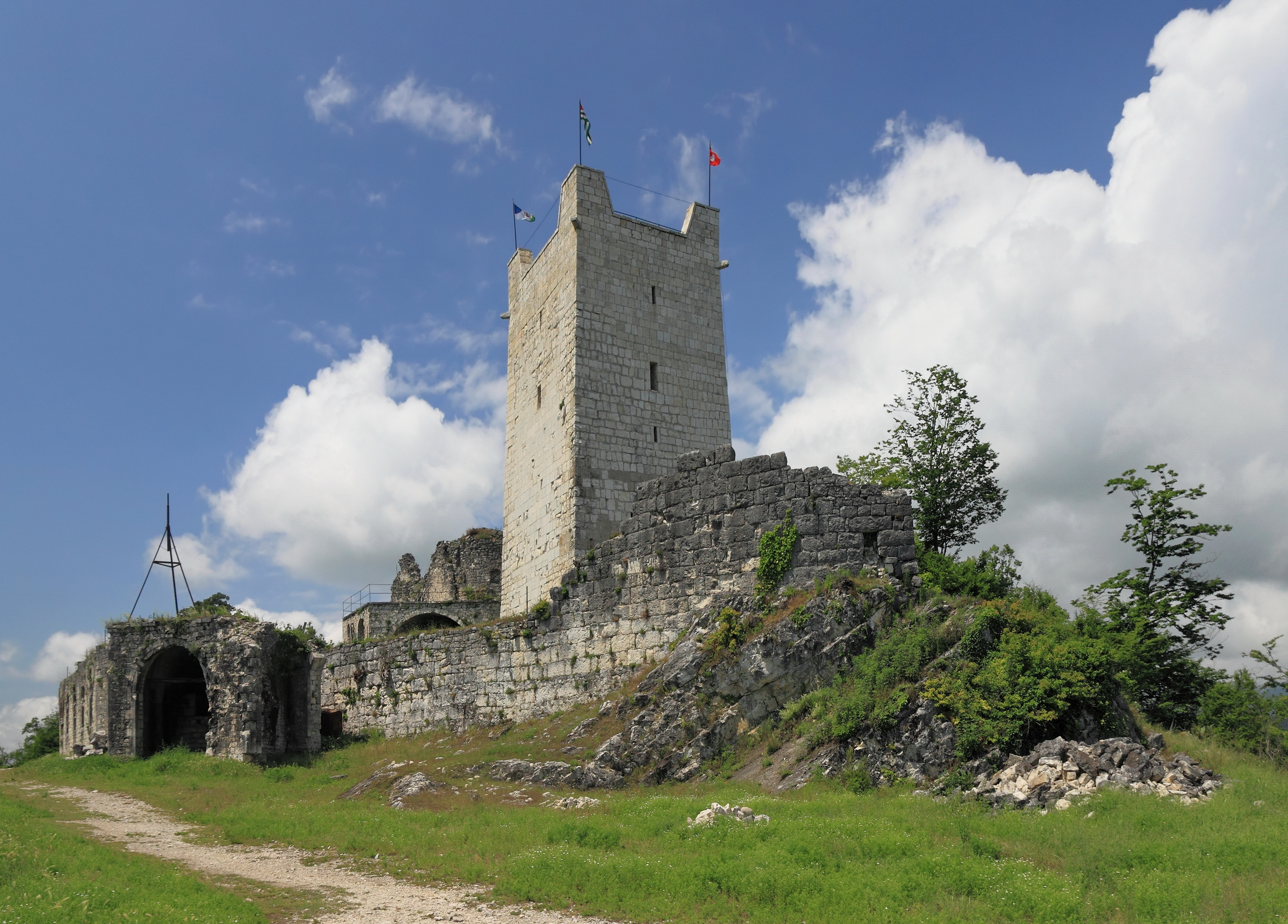
- Anakopia Fortress 2014

Site information
- Type: Castle & citadel
- Condition: Partially restored

Location
- Coordinates: 43°05′39.37″N 40°48′31.13″E

Site history
- Built: Begun in 2nd century Citadel walls built in 7th century
- Materials: Limestone blocks

Garrison information
- Occupants: Leon I of Abkhazia

Anakopia Fortress (Georgian: ანაკოფია, romanized: anak'opia) is an ancient military citadel in New Athos (as it is currently known) in the disputed Abkhazia, Georgia located some 22 km (14 miles) by road along the coast from Sukhumi. The site, approximately 450 × 150 meters in dimensions, is located a mile or so inland, at the top of the Iverian Mountain. It is the most complete surviving building of ancient Anakopia, the former capital of the Kingdom of Abkhazia.

== History ==
A military structure was constructed here between the second and fourth centuries. At the end of the seventh century, walls were constructed around the site of the citadel, with support from the Byzantines who had become alarmed by the Islamic Caliphate's expansionism. The walls, up to 60 centimeters (~2 feet) thick, are constructed of largely tightly assembled and carefully hewn limestone blocks. There is a single entrance, a small gate on the south side of the enclosure. At the centre lies a Roman-styled tower, four storeys high, with excellent views in all directions across the surrounding landscape and, to the south-west of the fortress, the Black Sea. A small Christian basilica was also constructed in the centre of the fortress during or before the eighth century. Its stone altar survives to this day (2014), along with some frescoes featuring a cross and some fishes, a religious symbol frequently used by early Christians in and around the Eastern Roman empire. Next to the church is a cistern filled naturally with spring water, by means of a 25 meter deep well beneath it.

During the eighth century, Anakopia found itself near the moving frontier that separated Byzantine Christendom from the Umayyad Caliphate, and in 736/737 Abū ʿAbd Al-Malik Marwān ibn Muḥammad, the future Marwan II, appeared outside the walls with a force of 60,000 men and laid siege to what was by then the capital of the Abkhazian Kingdom. The Georgian chronicle relates that the citadel was defended by a force of 1,000 Iberians and 2,000 Abkhazians under the leadership of Leon I of Abkhazia. The chronicle recalls that the Arab forces suffered from an epidemic that killed 35,000 of them while a further 3,000 were killed in the fighting. The successful defence of Anakopia is regarded as a pivotal turning point in the history of the region.

A restoration was undertaken in 2008 to improve the safety of the site and reinstate the tower as a usable lookout point.
