= Nicopsis =

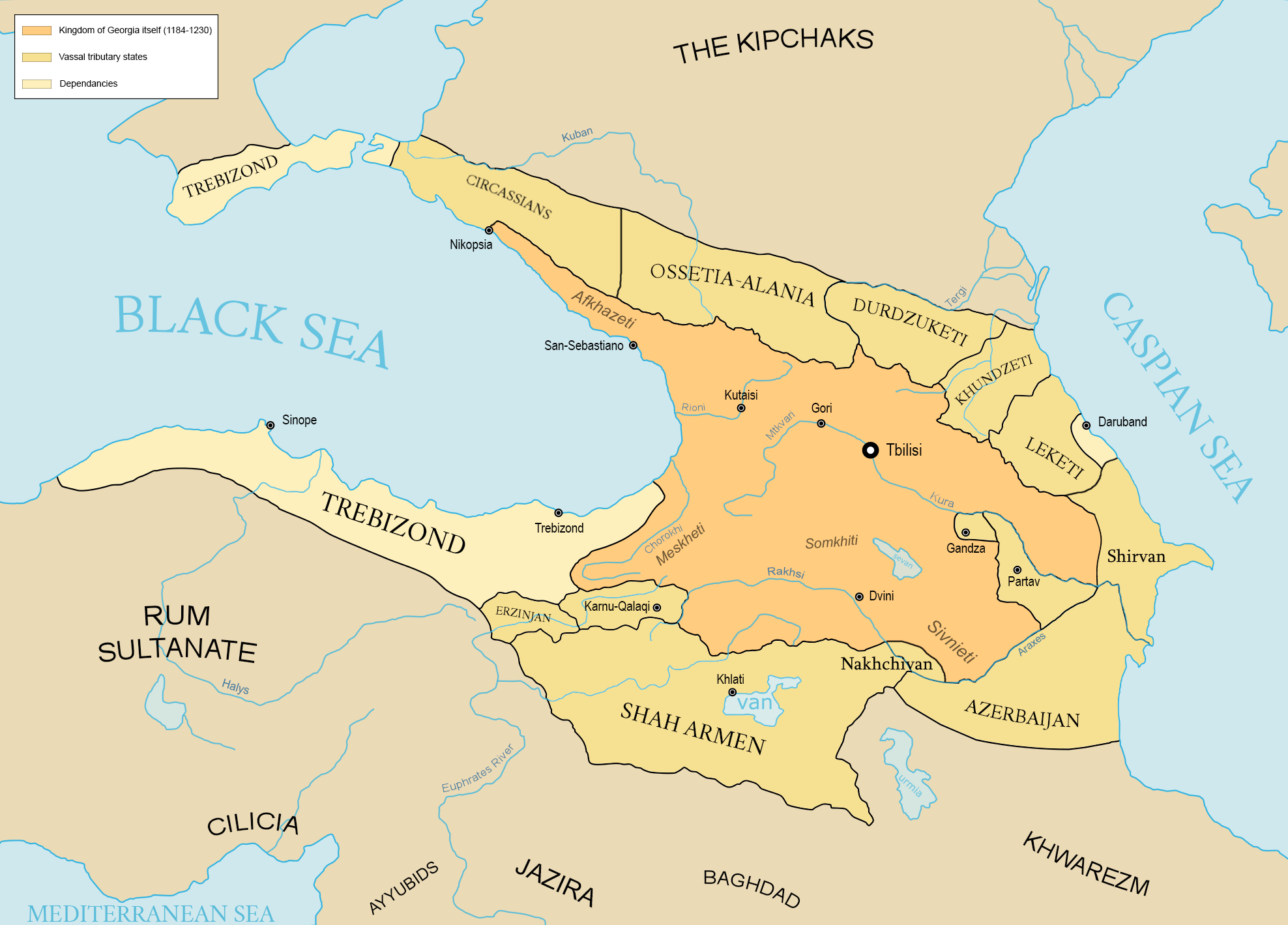
Nicopsia on a modern map of the Kingdom of Georgia early in the 13th century.

Nicopsis, Nikopsis, or Nikopsia (Greek: Νικόψις; Georgian: ნიკოფსი, ნიკოფსია; Adyghe: Ныджэпсыхъо) was a medieval fortress and town on the northeastern Black Sea coast, somewhere between the Russian towns of Tuapse and Gelendzhik. It features in the medieval Greek and Georgian sources as a Byzantine outpost and then as the northwestern extreme of the Kingdom of Georgia. A center of Christianity in the region known as Zichia, Nikopsis was at times a Byzantine bishopric and was believed to be a burial place of the apostle Simon the Canaanite.

== Early records ==
Nikopsis first appears in the anonymous periplus of the 5th century as a Black Sea locale otherwise known as Palaia Lazike ("Old Lazica"), a toponym also mentioned in the 2nd-century Periplus of the Euxine Sea by Arrian. This name suggests that the area was a scene of a considerable tribal movement or, in the view of Anthony Bryer, could have been the original homeland of the Laz people.

== Middle Ages ==
Nikopsis, as Napsa (ნაფსაჲ), appears as a Byzantine outpost—among the cities and places under "the sway of the servant of Christ, the king of the Ionians, who is residing in the great city of Constantinople"—in the 8th-century Georgian Vita of Abo of Tiflis by Ioane Sabanisdze. Nikopsis is called a kastron, "fortress", located on the homonymous river between Abasgia (Abkhazia) and Zichia, by Constantine Porphyrogenitus in the 10th century.

The Kingdom of Georgia expanded to the vicinity of Nicopsis during its "Golden Age" in the 12th and 13th centuries. Well known in the medieval Georgian texts was the boast that their kings held sway from "Nikopsia to Daruband". This formula determined the extent of the territory over which the Georgian monarchy claimed authority by means of its northwestern and northeastern geographic extremes, Nikopsis on the Black Sea and Derbend on the Caspian. It first appears in the controversial testament will of David IV "the Builder", composed (or forged) in 1125, and recurs in the chronicles of the reigns of his successors, especially, Queen Tamar (r. 1184–1213).

== Christianity ==
According to the 9th-century Byzantine author Epiphanius the Monk, who toured the area, there was a tomb in Nikopsis, containing relics, inscribed "of Simon the Canaanite", an apostle. The tradition is also found in the 11th-century Georgian Vita of George the Hagiorite by Giorgi Mtsire, who claims that Simon the Canaanite was buried "in our land, in Abkhazia, at the place which is called Nikopsi". Nikopsis was the seat of a Byzantine bishop of Zichia, probably founded under Justinian in the 6th century. In the middle of the 10th century, the see of Nikopsis was abolished or moved to Matracha.

== Location ==
The location of Nikopsis is not known. A popular, but not universally accepted hypothesis first advanced by Frédéric Dubois de Montpéreux and followed by Fillip Brun, Boris Kuftin, Zurab Anchabadze, and Leonid Lavrov, places Nikopsis at Novomikhaylovsky at the mouth of the Nechepsukho river near Tuapse, where the early medieval imported pottery, roof tiles, and marble pieces have been unearthed. Alternatively, Nikopsis has been identified with Anakopia near present-day New Athos or placed by Yuri Voronov at Gantiadi, where there are the ruins of an early medieval basilica.
