= List of universities in Georgia (country) =

This is a list of universities in the country Georgia. For a listing within the U.S. state of Georgia, refer to List of colleges and universities in Georgia (U.S. state).

== State universities ==
- Akaki Tsereteli State University (Kutaisi)
- Akhaltsikhe State Education University
- Batumi Art Teaching University
- Batumi Shota Rustaveli State University
- Batumi State Maritime Academy
- Georgian Technical University (Tbilisi)
- Gori State Teaching University
- Ilia State University (formed 2006)
- International School of Economics at Tbilisi State University
- Shota Meskhia Zugdidi State University
- Sokhumi State University (founded in Sokhumi, now in Tbilisi)
- Tbilisi Ivane Javakhishvili State University
- Tbilisi State Academy of Arts
- Tbilisi State Medical University
- Tbilisi Vano Sarajishvili State Conservatory
- Telavi Iakob Gogebashvili State University
- Shota Rustaveli University of Theater and Cinema (Tbilisi)

== Private universities ==
- Alterbridge University (Tbilisi)
- Agricultural University of Georgia (Tbilisi)
- American University for Humanities Tbilisi Campus
- BAU International University, Batumi (Batumi)
- Business and Technology University (Tbilisi)
- Caucasus International University (Tbilisi)
- Central Global University (Kutaisi)
- Caucasus University (Tbilisi)
- David Aghmashenebeli University of Georgia (Tbilisi)
- David Tvildiani Medical University (Tbilisi)
- East European University (Tbilisi)
- European University (Tbilisi)
- Free University of Tbilisi
- Georgian American University (Tbilisi)
- Georgian Aviation University (Tbilisi)
- Georgian International University (Tbilisi)
- Georgian Institute of Public Affairs (Tbilisi)
- Georgian National University SEU (Tbilisi)
- Grigol Robakidze University (Tbilisi)
- Guram Tavartkiladze Tbilisi Teaching University
- International Black Sea University (Tbilisi)
- Kutaisi University
- Kutaisi International University
- New Vision University (Tbilisi)
- New Georgian University (Poti)
- Saint Andrews Georgian University (Tbilisi)
- Sulkhan-Saba Orbeliani University (Tbilisi)
- Sukhishvili Teaching University (Gori)
- Petre Shotadze Tbilisi Medical Academy (Tbilisi)
- Tbilisi Medical Academy
- Tbilisi Medical Institute "Hippocrates"
- Tbilisi Teaching University
- Tbilisi University "Metekhi"
- Teaching University European Academy (Zugdidi)
- Teaching University Geomedi (Tbilisi)
- Teaching University "Iveria" (Tbilisi)
- Teaching University of International Relations of Georgia (Tbilisi)
- Teaching University "Rvali" (Rustavi)
- Teaching University SEU (Tbilisi)
- The University of Georgia (Tbilisi)
- University "Sakartvelo" (Tbilisi)

== Former ==
- Nersisian School (during the period in the Russian Empire)
