= Vakhushti Bagrationi Institute of Geography =

Research institute in Georgia (country)

Vakhushti Bagrationi Institute of Geography (Georgian: ვახუშტი ბაგრატიონის გეოგრაფიის ინსტიტუტი) is a scientific research institution, which was founded in 1933 on the basis of the Faculty of Geography of the Tbilisi State University in the city of Tbilisi. Some attempts at establishing geographical institutions in Georgia were undertaken even earlier. The initiator and inspirer of this event was academician Alexander Javakhishvili. In its first year the institute published 13 works with 50 various thematic maps. The Georgian Academy of Sciences was created in 1941, while the institute joined it in 1945, and in that same year was renamed after the Georgian scientist Vakhushti Bagrationi. When the institute was founded, it focused primarily on physical-geographical and economic-geographical research on separate administrative Georgian districts, and created relevant maps. Key features of the Georgian climate were studied. The institute returned to TSU in 2010.

Under the guidance of the institute the following atlases were compiled and published: "Atlas of Georgian SSR" (1964),Resorts and Resort Resources of Georgian SSR" (1989), "Educational-Geographical Atlas of Georgia" (1992), "Atlas of Vakhushti Bagrationi" (1997), as well as the large number of scientific papers, monographs, thematic maps for secondary and high schools, popular scientific literature, etc. The institute presented in 2018 the first “National Atlas of Georgia” at the Frankfurt Book Fair, where Georgia was the guest of honor. On November 10, 2023, the Georgian National Academy of Sciences distinguished the National Atlas of Georgia with the National Vakhushti Bagrationi prize (Laureate Diploma).

At different times the Vakhushti Bagrationi Institute of Geography was director by: Alexander Javakhishvili (1945–62), Feofan Davitaia (1962–79), Alexander Aslanikashvili (1980–81), Tamaz Kiknadze (1982–1991), Roman Kverenchkhiladze (1991), Zurab Tatashidze (1993–2005), Ramin Gobejishvili (2005–07), Nana Bolashvili (2007-present).

== Structure ==
Vakhushti Bagrationi Institute of Geography included Department of Geomorphology-Geoecology, Department of Hydrology and Climatology, Department of Physical Geography, Department of Social Geography and Cartography and GIS Laboratory.

Department of Geomorphology of the Vakhushti Bagrationi Institute of Geography was created in 1953. It was called the Department of Geomorphology during the periods of 1956–80 and 1992–2006, the Department of Geomorphology and Paleogeography—during 1980–92 and since 2006 it is called Department of Geomorphology-Geoecology. Well-known geomorphologists worked at the Department of Geomorphology: Levan Maruashvili, David Tsereteli, Shalva Kipiani, Nicholoz Astakhov, Giorgi Changashvili, Zurab Tatashidze, Demur Tabidze, Igor Bondirev, Ramin Gobejishvili and others. At different times the department was led by Professor Levan Maruashvili (1956–92).

Department of Hydrology and Climatology was created in 1958. Until 1980 the department was led by professor Lev Vladimirov. In 1980 the department was divided into two departments — of Hydrology and Climatology. In 2006, due to reorganization held in the institute the “Department of Natural Resources, Landscape Planning and Expertise” has been created on the basis of above mentioned department that existed only for three years. In October 2009 was restored the "Department of Hydrology and Climatology", with famous scientists Feofan Davitaia, Lev Vladimirov, Mitrofane Kordzakhia, Givi Gigineishvili, Vladimer Gvakharia, Ilia Apkhazava, Sandro Javakhishvili, Nana Bolashvili and others.

From the very beginning the Department of Physical Geography was formed as a Group of Landscape Sciences (David Tsereteli as head until 1962 and David Ukleba until 1973), afterwards it was reformed in a Laboratory of the Landscape Sciences and in 1981 — in the Department of Physical Geography. Research area of the department is the investigation of natural-territorial complexes (landscapes) of geographical environment, identification of regularity of its origin, structure, development and distribution. Complex physical-geographical (landscape) research was always properly treated in the scientific activity of the Institute of Geography. At different times the Department of Physical Geography was led by: David Ukleba, Zurab Seperteladze, Koba Kharadze, Nana Sulkhanishvili, Igor Bondirev, Giorgi Lominadze and others.

Department of Social Geography is one of the oldest structural units of the institute, which was originally created as a Department of Regional Economic Geography and then was named the Department of Economic Geography in 1945 just at entry of the Institute of Geography into the system of Academy of Sciences of Georgia. At the initial period the Department of Economic Geography consistently was led by Nadim Nizharadze, Giorgi Gekhtman, Luarsab Karbelashvili, and since 1953 during 25 years — by Giorgi Gvelesiani. The laboratory regional geography created by Roman Kverenchkhiladze. Investigations of population and cities were conducted as well by the department, which was proceeding under the supervision of Vakhtang Jaoshvili. By initiative of Emil Kobakhidze in 1977 a Thematic Group of the Recreation Geography was established at the department.

Cartography and GIS Laboratory actively participated in the institute's scientific research activities. During the process of development of the scientific subject “the physical-geographical and economic-geographical description of the regions of Georgia" 72 special maps of different scales were created for western Georgia and Adjara region. Manual of Cartography was published in Georgian language (Sergi Tskhakaia). From 1945 to 1949 the cartographic heritage of Vakhushti Bagrationi was studied. Monographs of Alexander Aslanikashvili “Cartography. Issues of general theory” and “Metacartography. Main problems" (1968, 1974) are devoted to the theories of a general cartography. By participation of the employees of the department the following works have been done: "Atlas of Georgian SSR" (1964), “National Atlas of Cuba” (1970), “Tourist Atlas of the Caucasus” (1989), "Study - Geographical Atlas of Georgia" (1992), "Atlas of Vakhushti Bagrationi" (1997). At different times the Department of Cartography were led by: Sergi Tskhakaia, Alexander Aslanikashvili, Rostom Chekurishvili, Ioseb Kartvelishvili, Jansug Kekelia.
