= Zurab Tatashidze =

Georgian geographer (1928–2011)

- Born: 24 September 1928; Sachkhere, Georgia
- Died: 12 June 2011 (aged 82); Tbilisi, Georgia
- Education: Tbilisi State University
- Scientific career
- Fields: Speleology; Karstology; Geomorphology

Zurab Tatashidze (Tintilozov) (Georgian: ზურაბ ტატაშიძე; September 24, 1928 – June 12, 2011) was a Georgian geographer. Doctor of Geographical Sciences (1973), professor (1979). Corresponding member of the Georgian Academy of Sciences (1997). Director of the Vakhushti Bagrationi Institute of Geography (1993–2005). President of the Georgian National Speleological Society (1998–2004). He was one of the discoverers of the New Athos Cave in 1961, which became one of the important tourism destinations in Europe.

== Biography ==
Zurab Tatashidze was born on September 24, 1928, in the Sachkhere, Sachkhere Municipality, Georgia. In 1951 he finished the Faculty of Geography and Geology at Tbilisi State University. At different times Zurab Tatashidze worked as a head teacher of the Gori Pedagogical Institute (1954–57), head teacher-scientist of the Vakhushti Bagrationi Institute of Geography (1958–60), head teacher of the Telavi Pedagogical Institute (1958–59), headed the Department of Karstology and Speleology of the Vakhushti Bagrationi Institute of Geography (1975–90), headed the Department of Geomorphology and Geoecology of the Tbilisi State University (1983–93) and chief scientist colleague of the Vakhushti Bagrationi Institute of Geography (1990–93).

His scientific works concerned Speleology, Karstology and Geomorphology. In 1973 defending his Doctor's degree. He produced over 600 scientific works in Georgian and Russian languages, of which 25 is fundamental monograph. Most of his work contain important material of scientific significance problem to the karst. Zurab Tatashidze was an important researcher of karst topography Georgian and entirely, Caucasus region. He made a great contribution in the development and popularization of speleological science in Georgia. With a professor Levan Maruashvili he was one of the founders of the speleological science in Georgia.

Zurab Tatashidze awarded the USSR State Prize in the field of science and technology in 1977 and the Order of Honor in 1999. in 1998 Tatashidze was an honoured the "Person of the Year 1998" to the American Biographical Institute.
