= List of colleges and universities in Georgia =

- List of colleges and universities in Georgia (U.S. state)
- List of universities in Georgia (country)
