= Levan Meskhoradze =

Georgian jurist

- Born: Georgian: ლევან მესხორაძე November 21, 1983 (age 42) (Georgian Soviet Socialist Republic) Kutaisi, Georgian SSR
- Citizenship: Soviet Union; Georgia
- Education: Tbilisi State University; Riga Graduate School of Law; George Mason University
- Occupation: Lawyer

Levan Meskhoradze (Georgian: ლევან მესხორაძე) (born November 21, 1983, Kutaisi)) is a Georgian lawyer, Project Manager at Council of Europe Office in Georgia, and a professor at the European University.

== Biography ==
Levan Meskhoradze graduated with honors from the Faculty of Law at the Ivane Javakhishvili Tbilisi State University. He earned a master's degree in International Public Law and European Law from the Riga Graduate School of Law (Riga, Latvia). He also completed executive management courses at George Mason University (Washington, D.C., United States).

He is specialized in international and human rights law, rule of law, criminal justice reform and policy, legal training and management. From 2008 to 2016, he was the head of the Department of the State Representation to the International Human Rights Courts of the Ministry of Justice of Georgia, as well as the representative of Georgia at the European Court of Human Rights in Strasbourg Court and other international courts. In 2009, the Georgian government appointed him an expert of the Steering Committee of Human rights at the Council of Europe. He acted as a Georgia's representative in a number of cases in the European Court of Human Rights, including "Georgia v. Russia I" ("Deportations case") and "Georgia v. Russia II" ("August Hostilities case").). He worked as an international consultant for the Council of Europe and other international organizations from 2016 to 2021.

Levan Meskoradze serves as an expert on human rights and criminal justice issues for the United Nations, the East-West Management Institute, the Training Center of the Prosecutor's Office, the Georgian Bar Association, and Higher School of Justice. He has been lecturing on international public law and human rights at various universities and law schools since 2008.

In 2021, he was granted Award of Honors by the President of Georgia for the special role in the interstate case Georgia v. Russian Federation.

== Selected publications ==
- Meskhoradze, L. (September 2022). Impact of COVID-19 on Human Rights. Law and World. Volume 8; Issue 3; Pages 106–123. ISSN: 2587–5043. (In English)
- მესხორაძე, ლ. (ივნისი, 2016). 6 თვის ხანდაზმულობის წესის ზოგიერთი ასპექტი ადამიანის უფლებათა ევროპული სასამართლოს უახლესი პრეცედენტული სამართლის მიხედვით. საქართველოს ადვოკატთა ასოციაცია. თბილისი. (In Georgian)
- მესხორაძე, ლ. (მაისი, 2016). საპროცესო შეთანხმება და სამართლიანი განხილვის უფლება: ეროვნული სამართალი და სტრასბურგის სასამართლოს პრაქტიკა. ამერიკის იურისტთა ასოციაცია (ABA ROL Initiative). თბილისი. (In Georgian)
- მესხორაძე, ლ. (2015). ადამიანის უფლებათა ევროპული სასამართლოს გადაწყვეტილებათა აღსრულების პროცედურები და სხვა მნიშვნელოვანი ასპექტები. ამერიკის იურისტთა ასოციაცია (ABA ROL Initiative). თბილისი. (In Georgian)
- მესხორაძე, ლ. (ივნისი, 2012). სამართლებრივი წერა, შუამდგომლობები და სამართალწარმოება ადამიანის უფლებათა ევროპული სასამართლოს წინაშე. ამერიკის იურისტთა ასოციაცია (ABA ROL Initiative). თბილისი. (In Georgian)
- მესხორაძე, ლ. (2009). პილოტური გადაწყვეტილებების პროცედურის მნიშვნელობა ადამიანის უფლებათა ევროპული სასამართლოს ინსტიტუციური რეფორმის ჭრილში კრებულში ადამიანის უფლებათა დაცვის თანამედროვე გამოწვევები. თბილისი: GTZ. გვ. 168–177. 978-9941-9063-8-1 (In Georgian)
