= Nana Bolashvili =

Georgian geographer

- Born: 25 November 1967 (age 58); Borjomi, Georgia
- Education: Tbilisi State University
- Scientific career
- Fields: Geography

Nana Bolashvili (Georgian: ნანა ბოლაშვილი; November 25, 1967) is a Georgian geographer born in Borjomi Georgia. She served as a deputy director of the Vakhushti Bagrationi Institute of Geography of the Tbilisi State University from 2006 to 2007. She became director of the institute in 2007 and has held the position since then. Since 2016, she has served as the president of the Alexander Javakhishvili Geographical Society of Georgia.

== Education ==
She studied at the Ivane Javakhishvili Tbilisi State University from 1984 to 1989, at the Faculty of Geography and Geology, specializing in surface-water hydrology. During 1985 to 1987, she also attended the Ilia Chavchavadze Tbilisi Institute of Foreign Languages, focusing on English language.

Between 1992 and 1996, she was a PhD student at the Georgian Academy of Sciences, specializing in Surface-water hydrology, water resources and hydrochemistry. Later, she participated in an International Training Course on "Weather modeling" in Beit Dagan, Israel (1998); followed by a course on "Satellite Meteorology" in Nanjing, China (2000).

== Career ==
She worked as a laboratory assistant in the Department of Hydrology at the Vakhushti Bagrationi Institute of Geography, Georgian National Academy of Sciences, from 1989 to 1992. Between 1992 and 2000, Bolashvili served as a scientist in the Department of Hydrology and Geoinformation Technologies at the same institute. From 2000 to 2018, she was a senior scientist at the department of hydrology and climatology, and since 2018, she has held the position of principle researcher there. In addition, she taught geography at the private school "British Connection – Academic" from 2002 to 2008 and was scientific secretary of the Institute of Geography during 2005–2006. From 2006 to 2023, she also worked as an expert in geography at the National Examination Center under the Ministry of Education and Science of Georgia.

Her international roles include serving as a scientific technical correspondent (STC) for the United Nations Convention to Combat Desertification (UNCCD) since 2010. In 2023, she was appointed as a member of the 2nd Intergovernmental Working Group (IWG) of UNCCD and has participated in all related meetings, including one in Chile in March 2024. The UNCCD COP16 took place in Riyadh in December 2024.

== Research ==
National Vakhushti Bagrationi Prize for the National Atlas of Georgia

Her research fields cover freshet prognosis, water resource assessment and management, karst and karstic water formation. She has participated in local and international grant projects and published articles in Georgian and international journals.

Nana Bolashvili promoted and lead the National Atlas project for several years. This first National Atlas of Georgia in English was presented at the Frankfurt Book Fair in 2018, where Georgia was the guest of honor. The National Atlas of Georgia was awarded the National Vakhushti Bagrationi prize (Laureate Diploma) in November 2023 for its comprehensive texts and new large-sized color maps.
