= Feofan =

Feofan or Theophan is a male given name. It may refer to:

- Feofan Davitaia (1911–1979), Georgian geographer
- Theophan Bystrov (1875–1940), Russian archbishop
- Theophan Prokopovich, (1681–1736), Ukrainian theologian

== See also ==
- Theophanes
