= David Ukleba =

Georgian geographer (1919–1999)

- Born: 27 December 1919; Simoneti, Terjola Municipality, Georgia
- Died: 26 July 1999 (aged 79); Tbilisi, Georgia
- Citizenship: Soviet
- Education: Tbilisi State University
- Scientific career
- Fields: landscape science
- Workplaces: Vakhushti Bagrationi Institute of Geography

David Ukleba (Georgian: დავით უკლება; December 27, 1919 — July 26, 1999) was a Georgian geographer. Doctor of Geographical Sciences (1971), professor (1985). Honored Scientist of the Georgian SSR (1984). He created a solid foundation for development of landscape science in Georgia.

David Ukleba was born on December 27, 1919, in the village of Simoneti, Terjola Municipality, Georgia. In 1947 he finished the Faculty of Geography and Geology at Tbilisi State University. He had been working at Vakhushti Bagrationi Institute of Geography from 1950 until his death, where he laid the foundation and headed the Department of Landscape Study and later the Department of Physical Geography. In the Department the landscape research method for mountainous areas was elaborated by David Ukleba and the physical-geographical zoning was carried out by him as well. He devoted more than 200 scientific works, including 7 monographs, many of which are printed in Georgian, Russian, English, French, Polish and Czech languages.

David Ukleba is included in the 1998 biography published by the American Biographical Institute in the "5000 Famous Person of the World". David Ukleba was awarded of the Vakhushti Bagrationi Prize (1987, 1993) and the Georgian state Prize.

== Works ==
- Geographical terminology (Georgian-Russian and Russian-Georgian), 1967;
- Physical-geographical zoning of East Georgia for agriculture purposes (in georgian, 1968);
- Landscapes and physical-geographical areas of the mountainous regions of Eastern Georgia (in georgian, 1974);
- Georgian Anthropogenic Landscapes (in russian, 1983).
