= Tsitsino Shurgaya =

Georgian surgeon

- Born: Georgia (country)
- Education: Tbilisi State Medical University
- Known for: Maxillofacial and Cosmetic face surgeon

Tsitsino Shurgaya (Georgian: ციცინო შურღაია) is a Georgian surgeon, born in Georgia who specializes in microsurgery of the face and neck. She is a facial nerve expert who treats facial paralysis and focuses her scientific research in all methods to rejuvenate the face and neck. She is one of the pioneers of facial rejuvenation in Russia and has devoted her life to studying the human face and all surgical and non-surgical methods to keep it looking younger and fight the onset of aging.

Shurgaya graduated from Tbilisi State Medical University in 1981. Since 1985 she was in residency later followed by postgraduate and doctoral studies at the Central Institute of Advancement of Medics (presently known as the Russian Medical Academy of Postgraduate Education – RMAPO ).

In 1992 she defended her thesis on “Neyromioplastic operations in paralysis and paresis of mimic muscles”. In 1995 she defended her doctoral dissertation on the topic: “A surgical algorithm for treatment of patients with facial paralysis”.

Shurgaya is a Maxillofacial and Plastic surgery expert. She has more than 100 publications and scientific papers, 10 personal methodologies of operation on the face and is a co-author of two guides on plastic surgery. She holds three patents on the "Method of treatment of unilateral facial paralysis"
