= Dimitri Vardanashvili =

- დიმიტრი ვარდანაშვილი
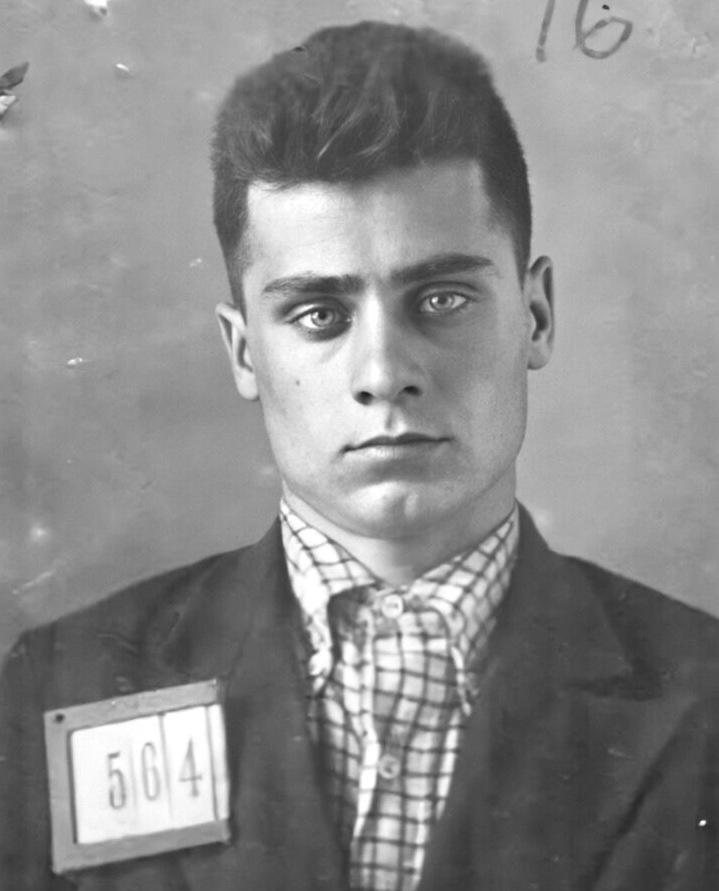
- Born: 1916; Kutaisi, Georgia, Russian Empire
- Died: September 20, 1937 (aged 20–21); Georgian Soviet Socialist Republic, Soviet Union
- Education: Kutaisi Pedagogical Institute; Tbilisi Medical Institute
- Occupations: Student, political activist
- Known for: Anti-Soviet and anti-communist student activism

Dimitri Mikheilis dze Vardanashvili (Georgian: დიმიტრი ვარდანაშვილი; 1916 – 20 September 1937) was a Georgian anti-Soviet activist. He organized an underground student activist cell, which aimed to resist the Soviet rule and advocated for the restoration of Georgia's independence. Vardanashvili's anti-regime activities resulted in his arrest by the secret police in 1937 and execution at the age of 21.

== Early life and education ==
Vardanashvili was born in 1916 in Kutaisi, Georgia, then part of the Russian Empire. His father Mikheil was a prominent educator and school principal. When Vardanashvili was five years old, Soviet Russia invaded and occupied Georgia in 1921, forcing Georgia's democratically elected government to go into exile to France. Growing up in the Soviet-occupied Georgia, Vardanashvili developed strong anti-regime sentiments, wishing for the restoration of Georgia's independence. He later enrolled as a student at the Kutaisi Pedagogical Institute (now Kutaisi State University).

== Activism ==
First major event in Vardanashvili's resistance activities occurred in December 1934. His institute was organizing a mandatory rally to mourn the assassination of Soviet official Sergei Kirov and demand the execution of his killer. Instead of mourning Kirov's death, Vardanashvili secretly created posters that proclaimed the assassin a hero and posted them on the institute grounds, which caused a big stir. Vardanashvili's involvement was never discovered and he very soon left town for the capital Tbilisi, where he enrolled in medical school.

In Tbilisi, Vardanashvili and a small circle of fellow students subsequently formed an underground dissident cell. Their objective was to create anti-Soviet propaganda and sustain Georgian patriotic sentiment. The cell decided to also mark the forbidden Georgian Independence Day on May 26, an extremely risky act in this time period, which would later become known as the Great Purge. Vardanashvili used a hidden typewriter to print out illegal "Menshevik" and pro-independence literature, and kept a revolver for self-defense.

== Arrest and execution ==
Vardanashvili's underground cell was compromised and discovered by Soviet state security organs in the summer of 1937. He was arrested along with several of his fellow student activists.

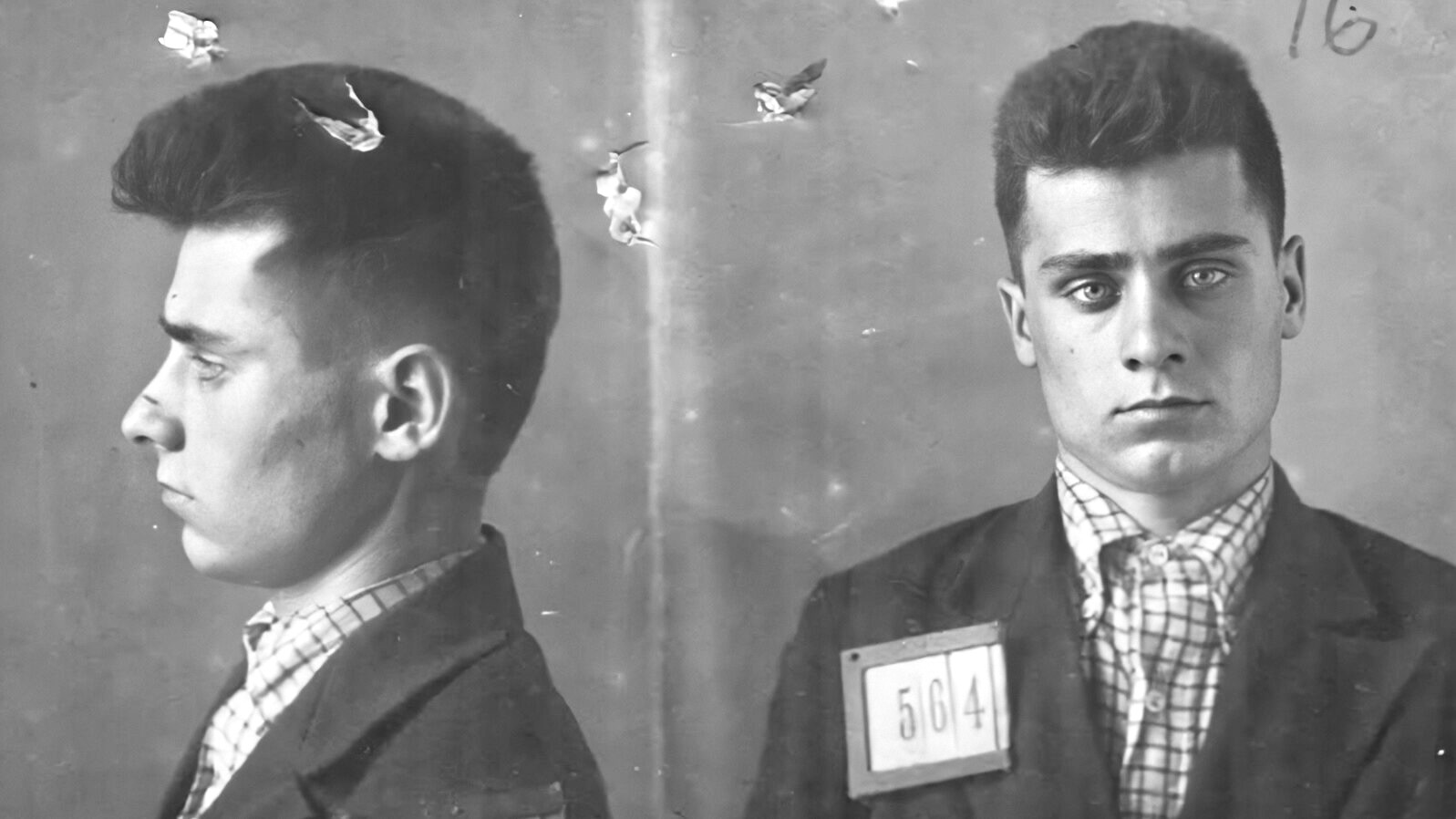
Dimitri as seen on his mugshot

During his interrogations and subsequent trial, Vardanashvili confessed fully to his hatred of the Soviet occupying regime and his fight for Georgia's freedom. However, in an attempt to protect his peers from execution, he claimed sole responsibility for the underground organization, testifying that he operated alone and had failed to formally recruit his friends into anti-Soviet resistance. He only asked the court to consider his young age and spare his life.

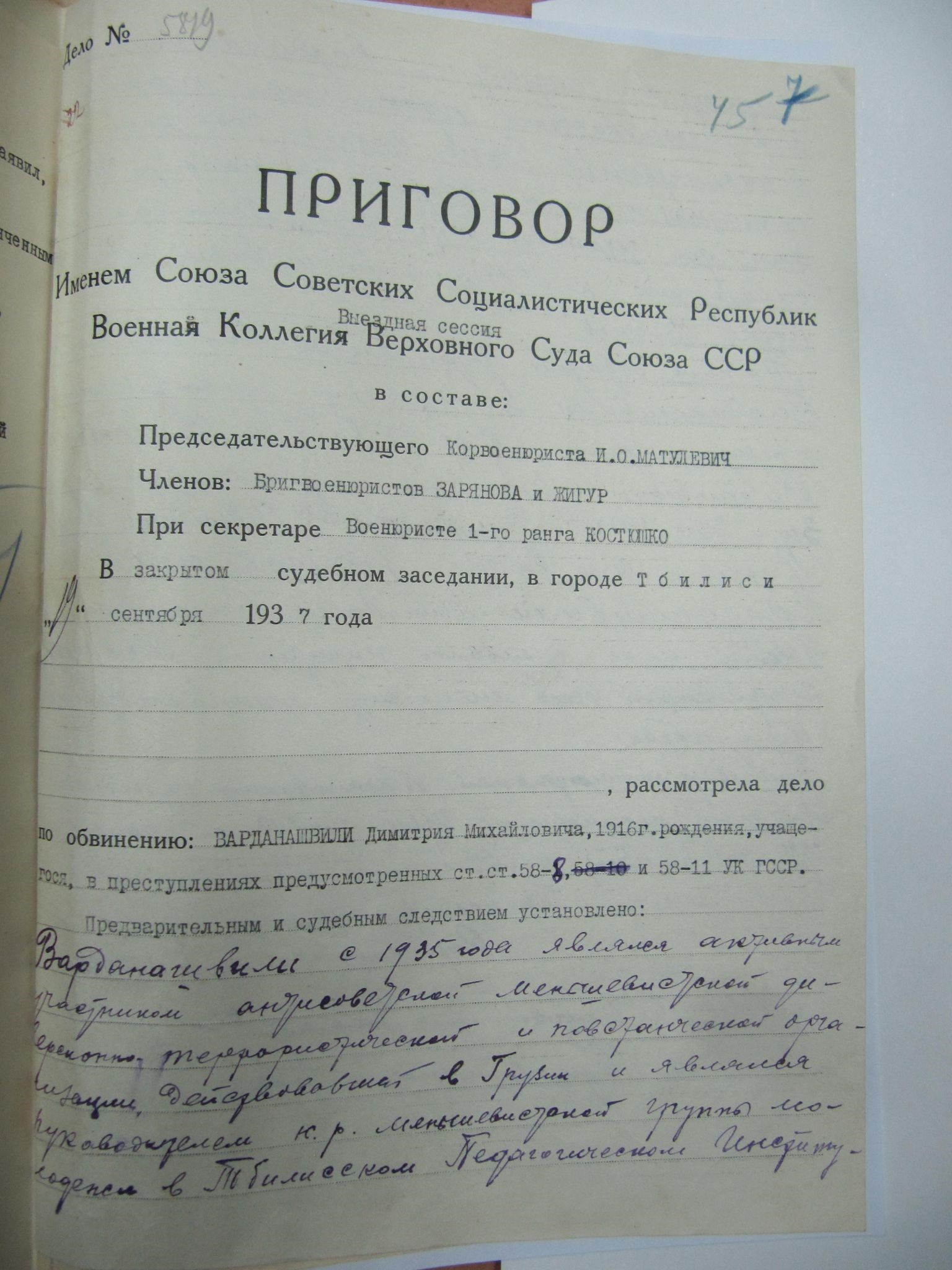
Order of the Military Collegium of the Supreme Court of the Soviet Union sentencing Vardanashvili to execution

On 19 September 1937, Vardanashvili was sentenced to the highest form of punishment, execution by firing squad, with confiscation of personal property. The order was issued by the Military Collegium of the Supreme Court of the Soviet Union, which held a special visiting session in Tbilisi. The process was presided over by Ivan Matulevich, who years later would be stripped of his ranks because of harsh and unsubstantiated decisions in relation to other victims.

Vardanashvili was executed the following day, at the age of 21. He is thought to have been buried on the outskirts of Tbilisi, although the exact location of his grave has never been established. His co-defendants were spared execution but were sentenced to 10 years of forced labor and exile in the Gulag camps of Siberia.

== Aftermath and legacy ==
To safeguard his remaining children from state retribution during the Purges, Vardanashvili's father destroyed Dimitri's belongings and personal effects and instructed his surviving children to never mention their brother's name. As a result, Vardanashvili's story remained largely unknown during the Soviet era. In 1989, during perestroika, the Soviet authorities still declined to rehabilitate him.

His surviving younger brother, Givi Vardanashvili (born c. 1925), ended up outliving the Soviet regime.

== See also ==
- Samson Dadiani
- Sandro Akhmeteli
- Jason Kereselidze
