= Alexander Aslanikashvili =

Georgian geographer and cartographer (1916–1981)

- Born: 17 March 1916; Tbilisi, Georgia
- Died: 25 November 1981 (aged 65); Tbilisi, Georgia
- Citizenship: Soviet
- Education: Tbilisi State University
- Scientific career
- Fields: Cartography
- Workplaces: Vakhushti Bagrationi Institute of Geography

Alexander Aslanikashvili (Georgian: ალექსანდრე ასლანიკაშვილი; March 17, 1916 – November 25, 1981) was a Georgian cartographer. Doctor of Geographical Sciences (1969). Corresponding member of the Georgian Academy of Sciences (1979). Professor of the Tbilisi State University and the Chair of Cartography and Geodesy (1973–81). Director of the Vakhushti Bagrationi Institute of Geography (1980–81). He developed his theory of cartography, which is called Metacartography.

== Biography ==
Alexander Aslanikashvili was born on March 17, 1916 in the Tbilisi. In 1934 he graduated from the Transcaucasian Technical School. From 1935 to 1939 he studied at the Faculty of Geography and Geology of the Tbilisi State University. During World War II, Alexander Aslanikashvili worked in the Department of Cartography of the Transcaucasian Military District and participated in the creation and specification of topography maps. From 1945 to 1951, he also worked at the Ministry of Foreign Affairs of Georgia. From 1951 to 1981 he worked at Vakhushti Bagrationi Institute of Geography. From 1951 to 1963 he was the Scientific Secretary of the Institute, and since 1957 the Head of the Cartography Department.

He combined logical thinking forms such as comparison, abstraction, generalization, analysis, synthesis and modeling with cartographic reflection, and therefore gave the definition of cartographic forms of comparison, analysis, synthesis, abstraction, generalization and modeling.

Scientific researches of Alexander Aslanikashvili clarified the cardinal problems of theory of cartography and methodological issues of mapping. He created and edited a lot of maps. Among them are the maps included in the "Atlas of Georgian SSR" (Tbilisi–Moscow, 1964). He is the author of fundamental works: "Cartography. Issues of general theory" (1968) and “Metacartography. Main problems" (1974), where fundamentally demonstrated the subject of cartography, the method and the language of the map, and he developed its theoretical fundamentals. In a basis of the theory of cartography its so-called big triad lies: subject, method and language. Alexander Aslanikashvili the concept called Metacartography.

The concept was considered as semiotic, unlike the cognitive geographic approach of the Moscow State university’s cartography school, but cartographer Konstantin Salishchev accepted the theory of Aslanikashvilli. The book “Metacartography“ was translated from English to Japanese by Tositomo Kanakubo in 1998. Aslanikashvili was awarded the State Prize of Georgia in 1971. He was also decorated with the Badge of Honour.
