= Central University of Europe =

Private university in Georgia

- ევროპის ცენტრალური უნივერსიტეტი
- Other name: CUE
- Former name: Kutaisi University
- Type: Private
- Established: 1991; 35 years ago
- Founders: Valerian Kelbakiani; Revaz Laghidze
- President: Lasha Kandelakishvili
- Rector: Gocha Tutberidze
- Location: 13 Tsereteli St., Kutaisi, Georgia (country)
- Campus: Urban
- Website: cue.edu.ge

Central University of Europe (Georgian: ევროპის ცენტრალური უნივერსიტეტი) is a private university in Kutaisi, Georgia. It was established in 1991 by Valerian Kelbakiani and Revaz Laghidze. Central University of Europe was the first higher educational institution in the western part of Georgia. At Kutaisi University, there are two faculties: the Faculty of Medicine and the Faculty of Social Sciences, Business and Law. The current rector of the university is Gocha Tutberidze.

== History ==
Central University of Europe was founded in 1991 as the Kutaisi Institute of Law and Economics. It was the first higher educational institution in the western part of Georgia. It was renamed Kutaisi University of Law and Economics in 1992, and Kutaisi University in 2010.

Central University of Europe is a member of the Association of Private Universities. It has been a member of the European University Association as an individual associate member since October 29, 2021.

Central University of Europe has a logo, seal, and title page, approved by the Rector.

== Study programs ==
Central University of Europe has two faculties: the Faculty of Social Sciences, Business and Law and the Faculty of Medicine, which currently offers 8 higher education programs. The university offers both Georgian and English language programs.

The Faculty of Social Sciences, Business, and Law offers the most in-demand educational programs at all three levels of higher education. The faculty publishes "Economic Profile", a scientific journal that is indexed in numerous reference databases. The Dean of the faculty is Teona Grigolashvili. The faculty offers undergraduate programs in law, business administration, tourism and economics, master's degree programs in finances and accounting and auditing and a doctoral program in economics.

At the Faculty of Medicine, the Medical Doctor Program is implemented, which is based on World Federation for Medical Education (WFME) standards. The Dean of the Faculty is Tamar Pertaia. There is a simulation center on the faculty.

Biochemical and histological, Physiological and Microbiological/Immunological laboratories operate at the university.

== Organisation and management ==
Lasha Kandelakishvili served as the university's rector from July 2 to December 29, 2020. The current rector of the university is Gocha Tutberidze. Vice-Rector for International Relations is Tamar Zarginava, Vice-Rector for Quality Enhancement is Sophio Khundadze and Vice-Rector for Academic Process Administration is Nino Taliashvili. The governing body of the university is The Governing Board of Kutaisi University.

== See also ==
- List of universities in Georgia (country)
- European University
- Akaki Tsereteli State University
