= New Athos Cave Railway =

Underground electric railroad in New Athos, Abkhazia

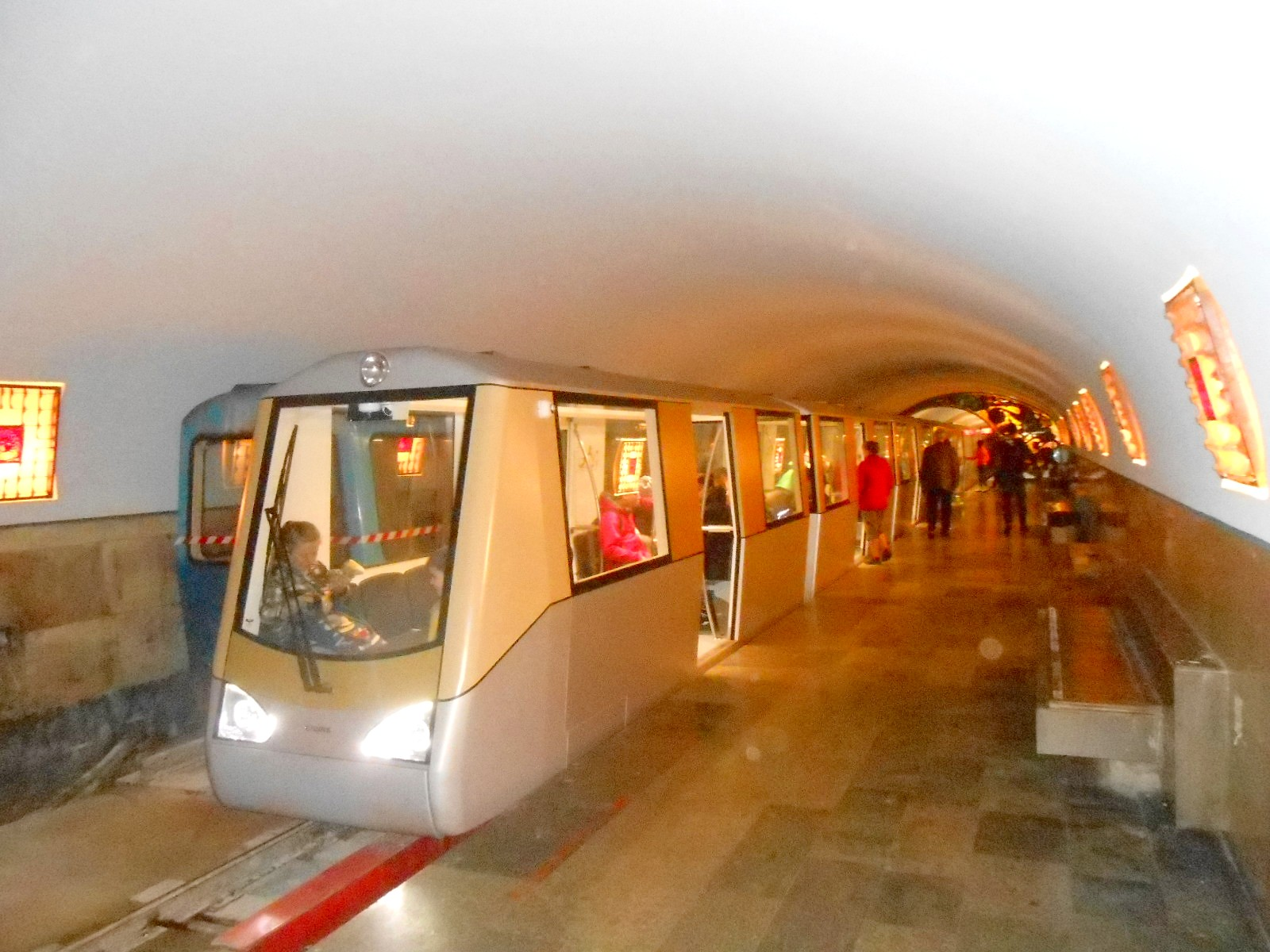
- New Athos subway train, built in Riga.

Overview
- Owner: New Athos Cave
- Locale: New Athos: Abkhazia de facto; Georgia de jure
- Termini: Entrance gate; Hall Anakopea
- Stations: 3

Service
- Type: Rapid transit
- Rolling stock: 3 trains

History
- Opened: 4 July 1975

Technical
- Line length: 1.291 km (0.802 mi)
- Num of tracks: Single track
- Track gauge: 914 mm (3 ft)
- Electrification: 300 V DC
- Operating speed: 30 km/h (19 mph)
Cave Railway and the two national railway stations within the town: New Athos and Psyrtscha

New Athos Cave Railway (Abkhaz: Афон Ҿыц аҳаҧытә метро; Georgian: ახალი ათონის მღვიმური რკინიგზა, Russian: Новоафонская пещерная железная дорога), also known as New Athos Subway, is an underground electric railway serving the New Athos Cave, in the town of New Athos, Abkhazia. (Note: The political status of Abkhazia is disputed. Having unilaterally declared independence from Georgia in 1992, Abkhazia is formally recognised as an independent state by 4 UN member states (three other states previously recognised it but then withdrew their recognition), while the remainder of the international community recognizes it as de jure Georgian territory. Georgia continues to claim the area as its own territory, designating it as Russian-occupied territory.)

== Route ==
The line is a single track and electrified narrow gauge railway with a third rail. Opened in 1975, it has a length of 1.3 kilometres (0.81 mi) and three stations. It starts at the entrance of the caves, nearby Psyrtscha station of the Abkhazian railway. From the Entrance Gate station, it reaches two cave halls: Apsny Hall (or Abkhazia) and Anakopea Hall. Apsny station serves to lead the tourists at the beginnings of the show cave, and Anakopea to bring them back to the entrance gate, at the end of the tour. The line has a depot just before Entrance station, and a service tunnel between it and Apsny.

Station	Georgian name	Russian name	km	Notes
Entrance Gate	შესასვლელი ჭიშკარი (shesasvleli tchishkari)	Входные Ворота (Vkhodnye Vorota)	0.00	Link to Abkhazian railway at the nearby station of Psyrtscha; 43.09065°N 40.810008°E
Hall Apsny	აფხაზეთი (ap'khazet'i)	Зал Апсны (Zal Apsny)	1.00	43.09959°N 40.81114°E
Hall Anakopia	თბილისი (t'bilisi)	Зал Анакопия (Zal Anakopiya)	1.29	43.10184°N 40.81129°E

== Rolling stock ==
The railway has three power-concentrated battery electric multiple units built by the Railroad Machinery Plants of Riga in Latvia, including two Ep «Tourist» trains and the newly built Ep-563 train, and also the auxiliary mining battery-electric locomotive ARP8 which is used in case of malfunction of EMU's motor car. Two Ep trains were built in 1975 and later both of them were modernized in Moscow in 2005 and 2009. In 2013, due to the wear of these trains, the railway management ordered a new train in Riga, which was built the next year. Since 2014 this has been the only train in use. The first Ep train is based at Anakopia station for doubling the Ep 563 train in case of malfunction. Another Ep train is based at the depot. Each train consists of 6 cars, including 1 power car with driver's cab, motors and power equipment and 5 trailer cars for passengers (4 intermediate cars and 1 observation car in the end). Both models run either on a third rail with 300 V DC or batteries with 240 V DC being used for short unelectrified sections at switches without a third rail, and also at passenger stations where the third rail has no voltage for safety reasons.

== Gallery ==
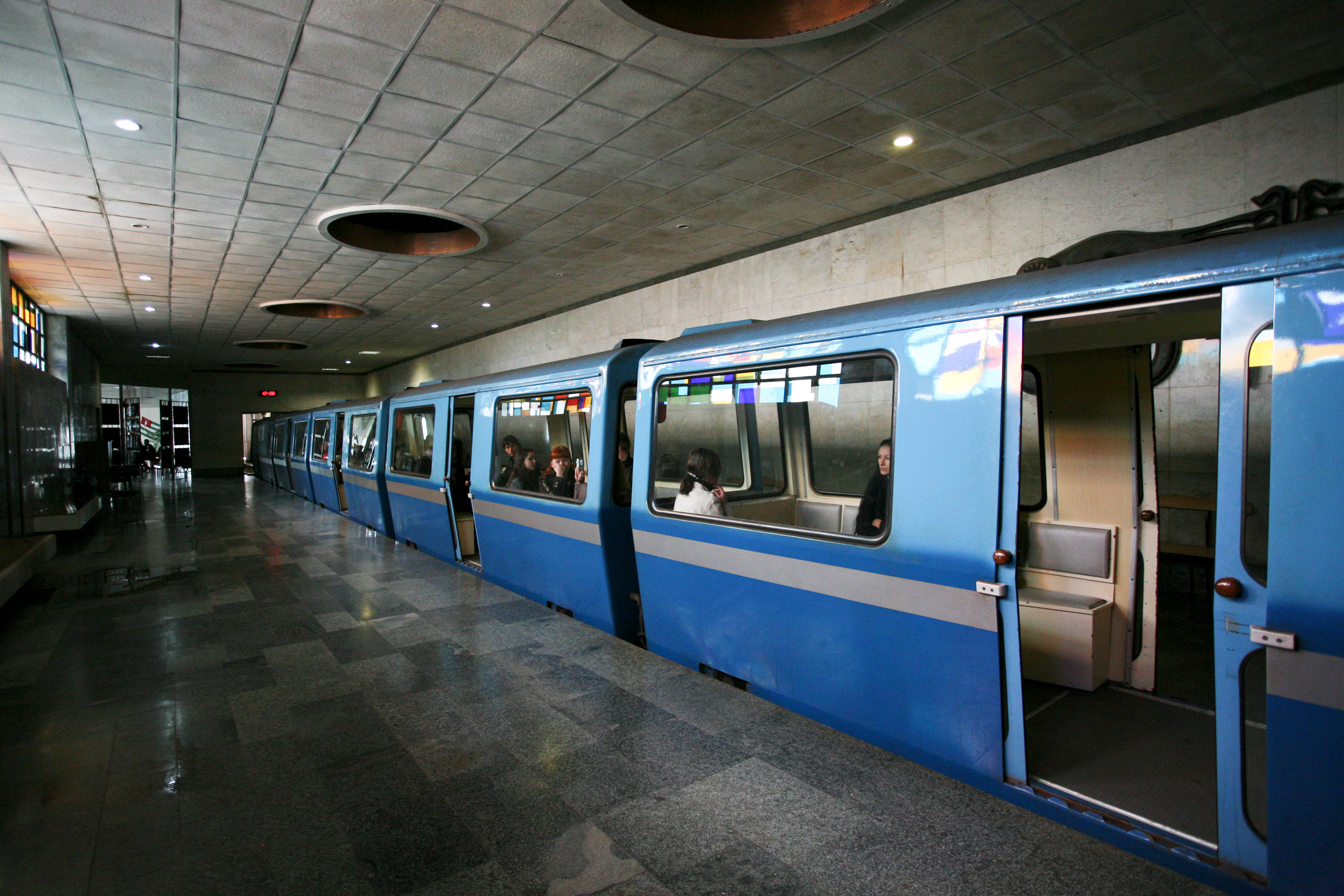
Ep train at Entrance station

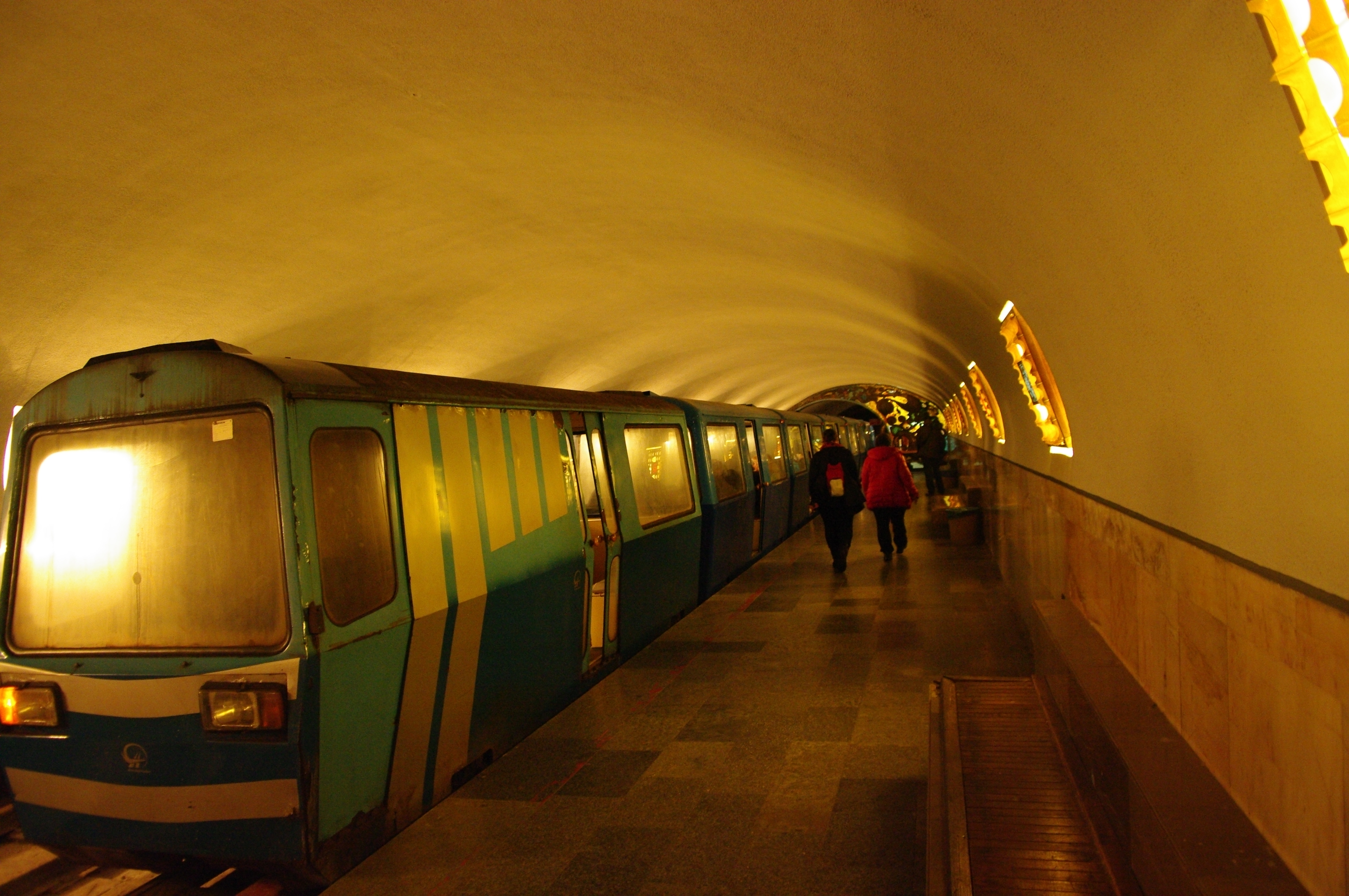
Ep train at Anakopia station

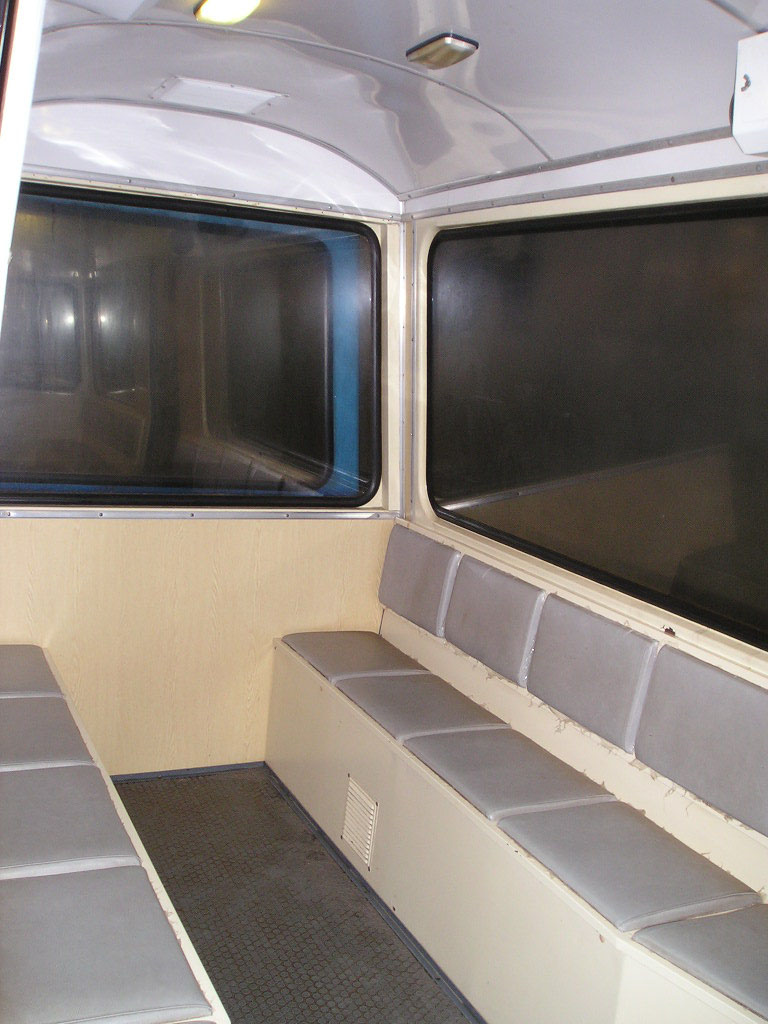
Ep train interior, 2006

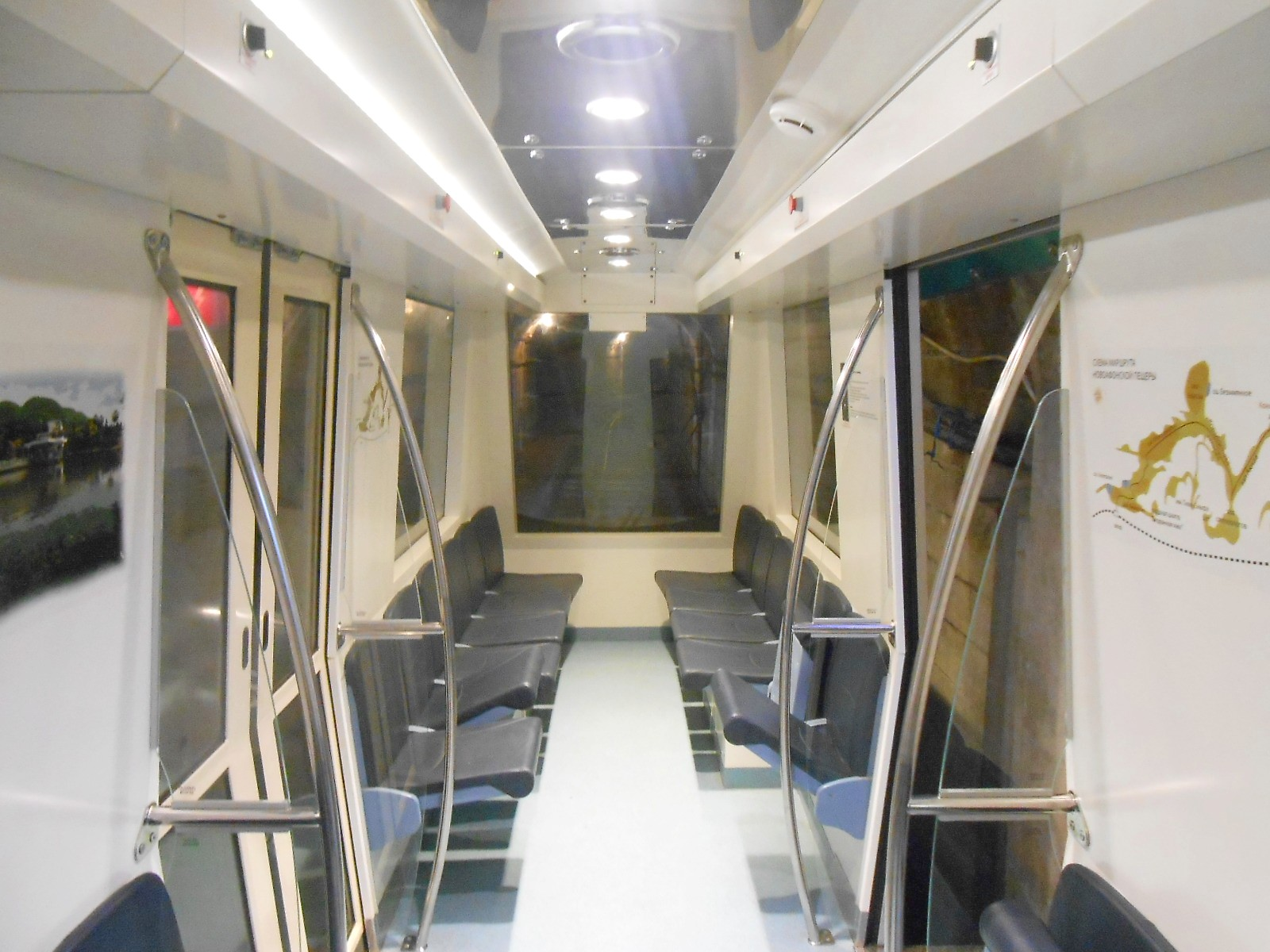
Ep-563 train interior, 2014

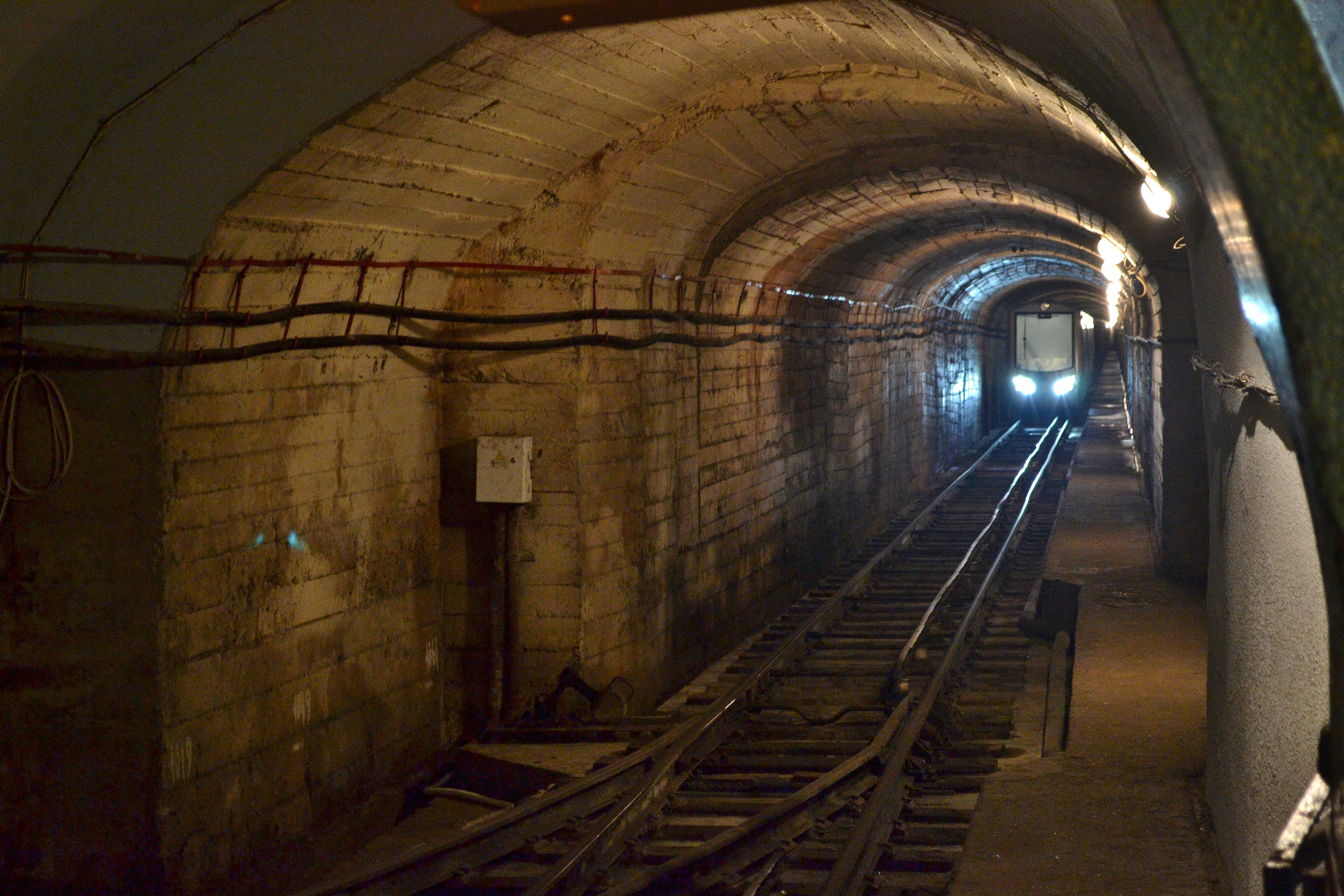
Ep train arriving at Anakopea station

== See also ==
- New Athos Cave
