= New Athos Cave =

Cave in New Athos, Abkhazia, Georgia

- ახალი ათონის მღვიმე, Афон Ҿыцтәи аҳаҧы
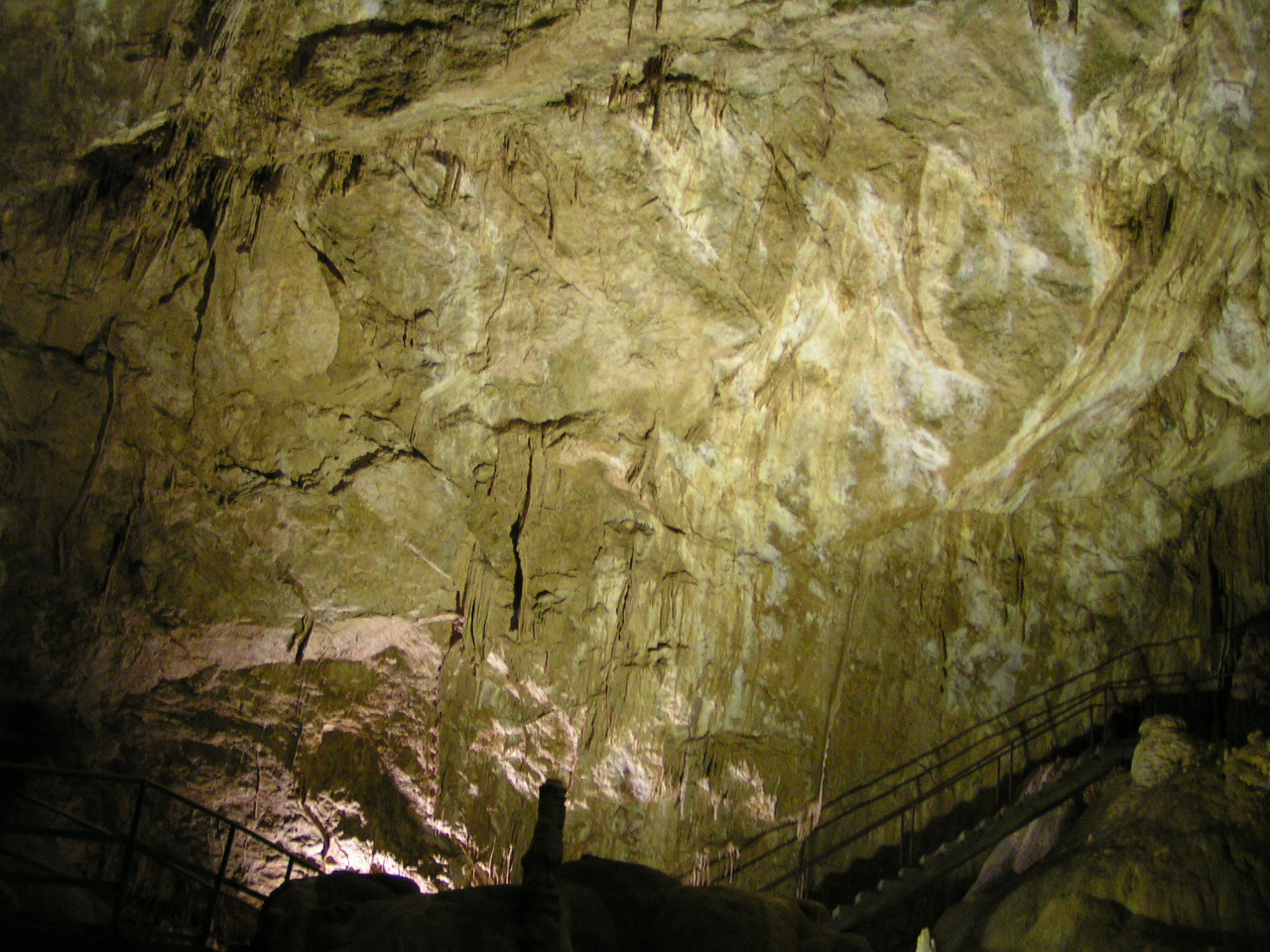
- The New Athos Cave, 2006

- Location within Abkhazia Location within Georgia
- Interactive map of New Athos Cave
- Location: New Athos: (Georgia (country)) Abkhazia, Georgia de jure
- Coordinates: 43°05′26.34″N 40°48′36.03″E
- Depth: 183 m
- Length: 1,900 m
- Geology: Karst cave
- Entrances: 4
- Access: Public
- Show cave opened: 1961
- Show cave length: 1,900 m
- Website: Official website

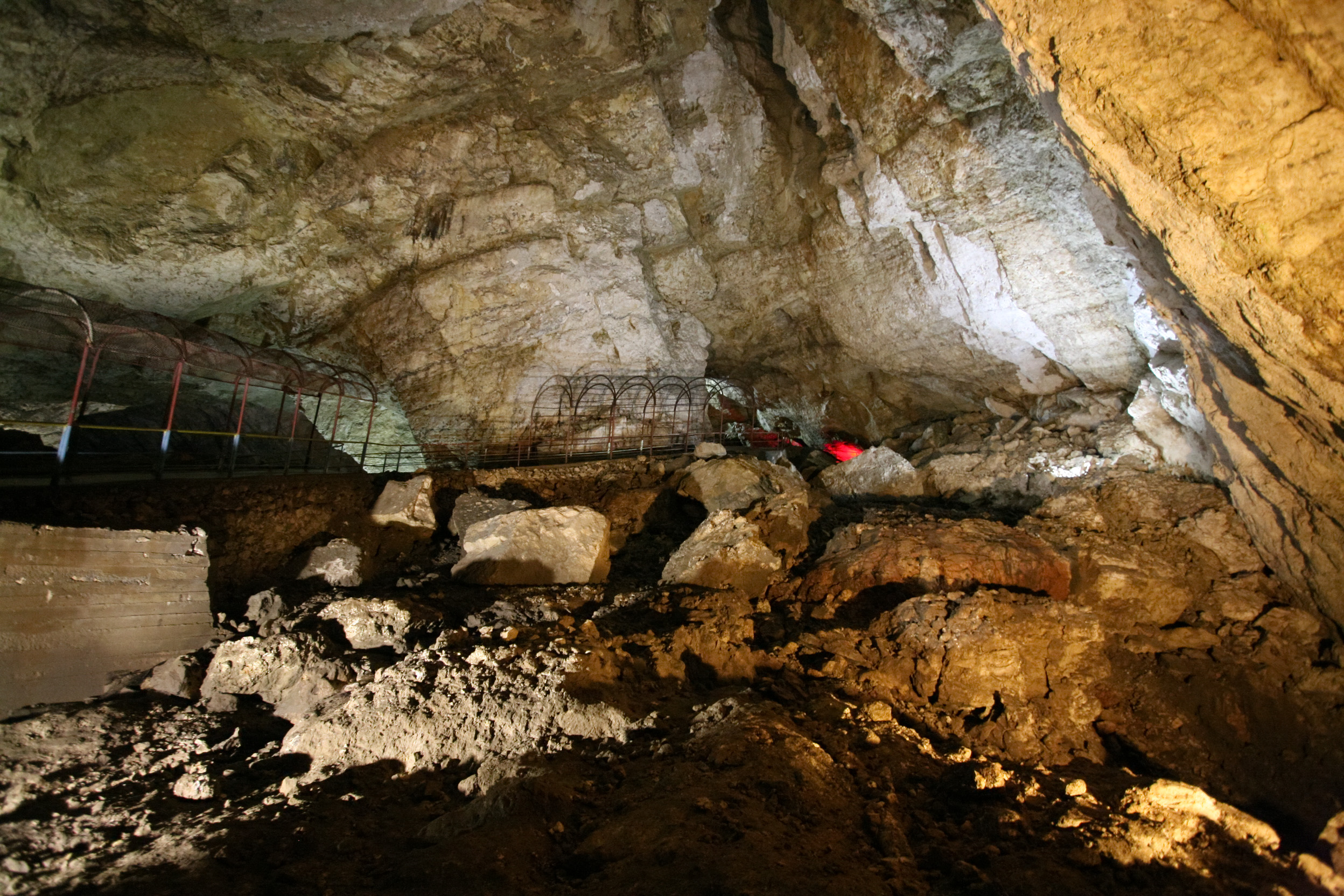
View of the cave

The New Athos Cave (Georgian: ახალი ათონის მღვიმე; Abkhaz: Афон Ҿыцтәи аҳаҧы) also Novoafonskaya, Novy Afon Cave, or New Afon Cave is a karst cave in the Iverian Mountain in Abkhazia (Georgia) near the city of New Athos.

== Overview ==
The abyss on a slope of the Iverian Mountain was known for ages, referred to as the "Bottomless Pit". It was explored in 1961 by an expedition of four: Zurab Tatashidze, Arsen Okrojanashvili, Boris Gergedava, and Givi Smyr.

Since 1975, it has been a major tourist attraction, featuring its own underground railway. The cave consists of 9 major cavities.

== Gallery ==
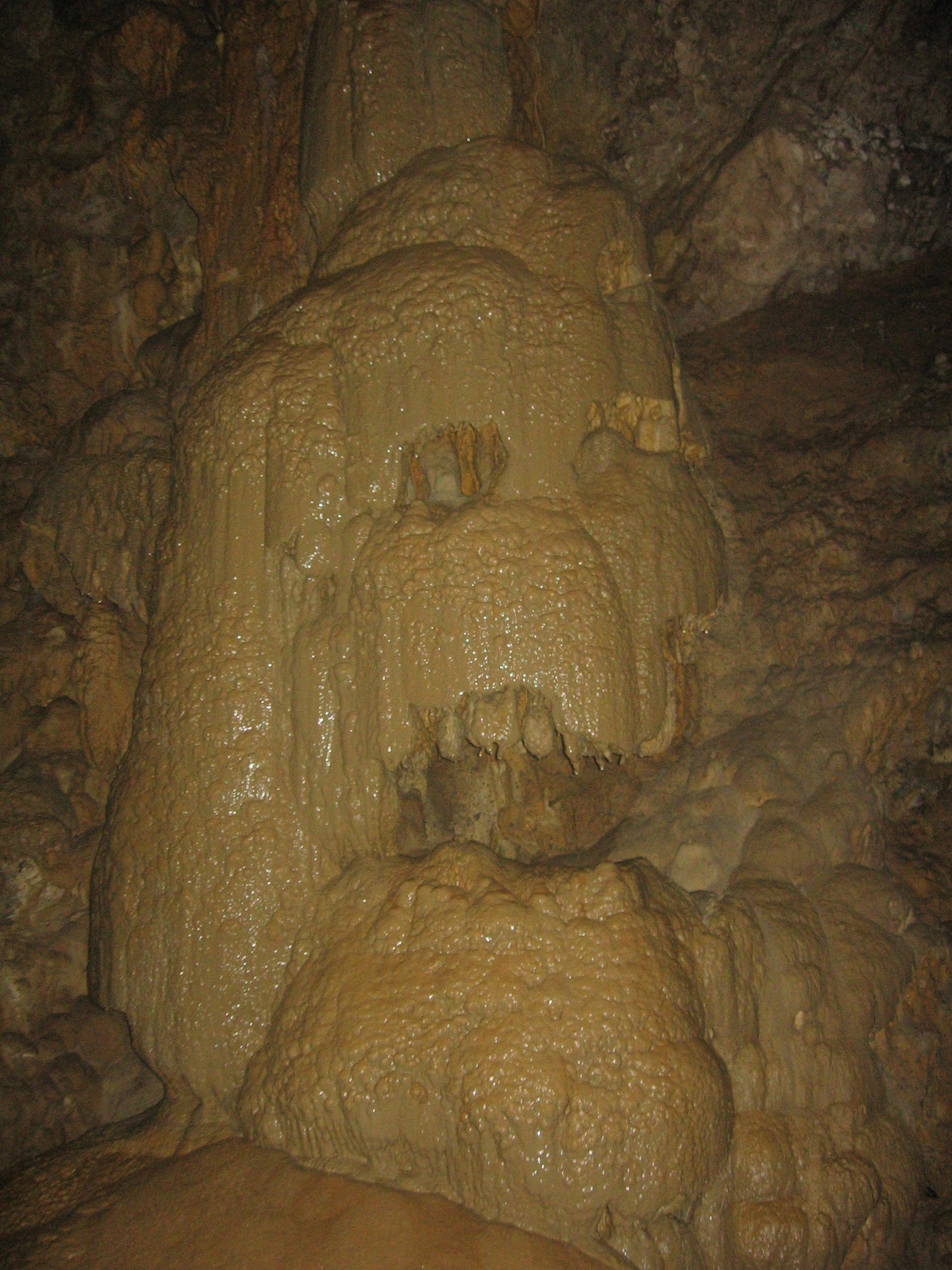
The Skeleton

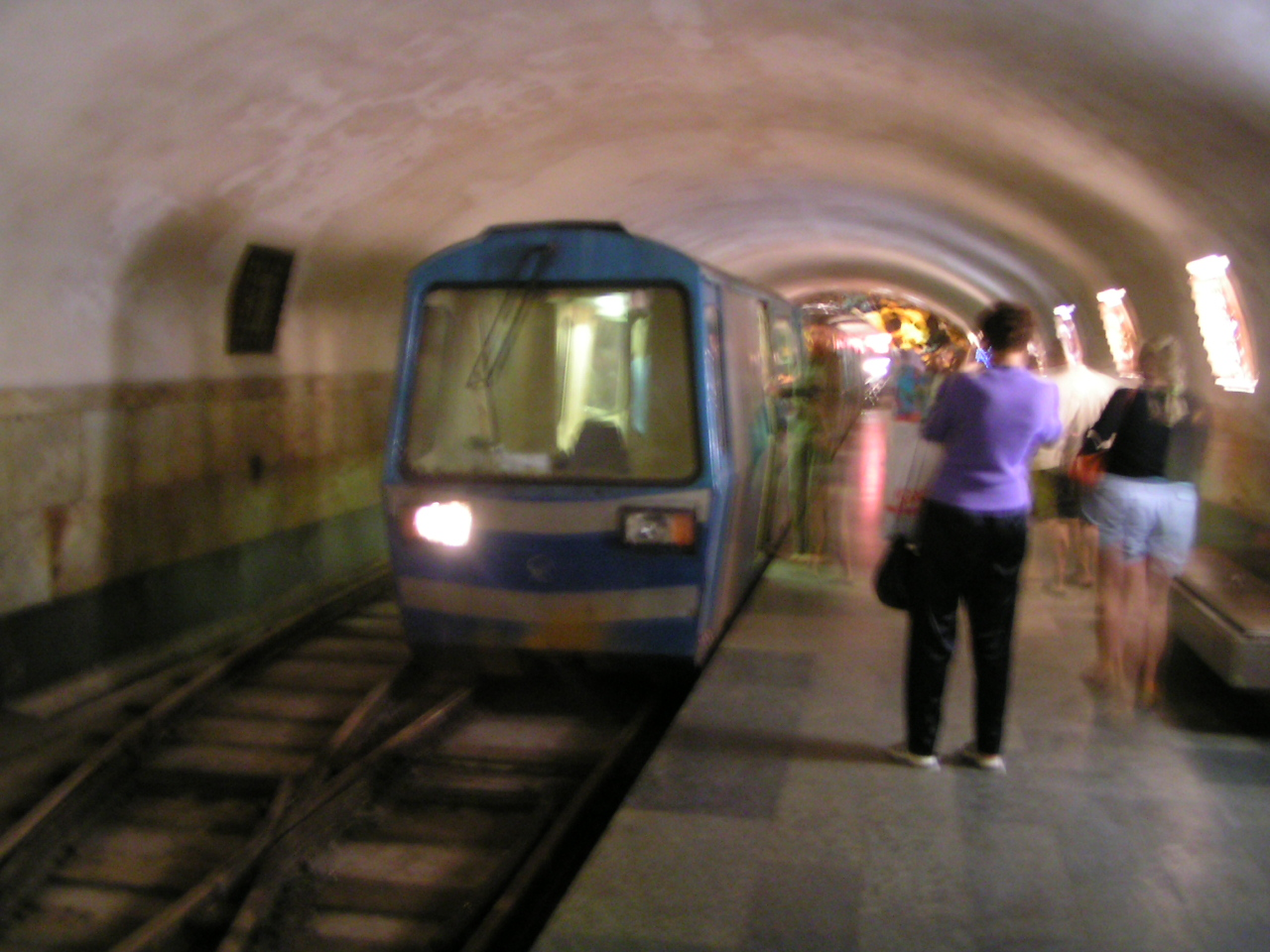
Ep train in New Athos Cave metro

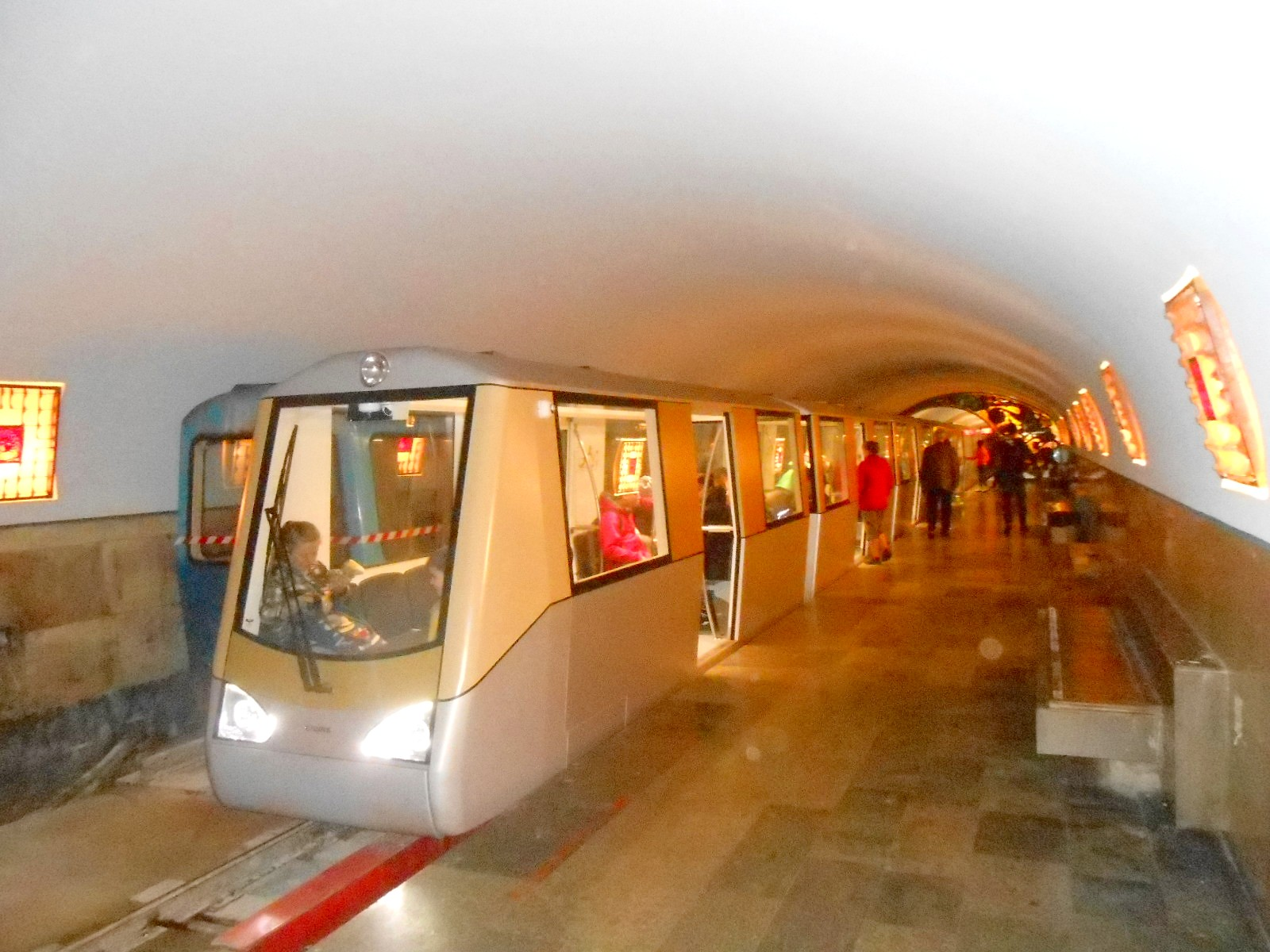
Ep-563 train in New Athos Cave metro

== See also ==
- New Athos Cave Railway
- Voronya Cave, second deepest in the world
