= Jo Ann University Hospital =

Geography
- Location: Tbilisi, Georgia (country)
- Coordinates: 41.78353°N 44.77479°E

Organisation
- Type: Teaching Hospital
- Affiliated university: European University

History
- Founded: 1996

Links
- Website: joann.ge
- Lists: Hospitals in Georgia (country)

Jo Ann University Hospital (Georgian: ჯო ენის საუნივერსიტეტო ჰოსპიტალი; former Jo Ann Medical Center, Georgian: ჯო ენის სამედიცინო ცენტრი) is a university hospital and a narrowly focused tertiary educational institution in Tbilisi, Georgia.

== History ==
Jo Ann McGowan is associated with the establishment of Jo Ann University Hospital. After meeting with Irakli Metreveli in the United States, Jo Ann expressed her desire to establish a Georgian counterpart to the existing Children's Cardiac Surgery Center in St. Petersburg.

In 1993, a group of Georgian physicians traveled to St. Petersburg to study at Jo Ann McGowan's Cardiac Surgery Clinic. The analog clinic was founded in Tbilisi on September 16, 1996, as a diagnostic and treatment facility for pediatric cardiology and congenital heart defects. The first surgeries on children born with heart defects took place the same year. The following year, a clinical laboratory was established, and in 1998, a psychological assistance service was established to assist patients with congenital heart disease.

In 1999, Jo Ann Medical Center established an independent, free, donation-based safe "blood bank".

The Department of Adult Cardiovascular Surgery and Emergency Cardiology was added to the center in 2000, and an angiocardiography laboratory has been in place since 2003.

Since 2006, the Extracorporeal Life Preservation/ELSO program has functioned in the center. In the same year, Arrhythmology service was established.

In 2022, European University became the owner of Jo Ann Medical Center, which was renamed Jo Ann University Hospital. The hospital will be chaired by Tamar Zarginava, Vice-Rector of the European University.

== Organization and management ==
The center was founded by five Georgian and US citizens. The group makes the most critical strategic decisions. The Board does not interfere with the center's day-to-day operations unless essential choices are required, such as the purchase of new medical equipment, the establishment of a new department, etc.

The center's funding comes from donor organizations and healthcare programs such as the State Universal Healthcare Program and the State Program of Referral Services. The state pays for all congenital heart diseases and other pathologies in children through the State Program of Referral Services. The State Universal Healthcare Program accounts for 80 percent of the organization's total revenue. The remaining 20% accounts for the patients' direct payments and the amount paid by insurance companies.
