= Jo Ann McGowan =

American philanthropist (1939-1996)

- Born: July 18, 1939; California, United States
- Died: September 23, 1996 (aged 57); Saint Petersburg, Russia

Jo Ann McGowan (July 18, 1939, California ― September 23, 1996, Saint Petersburg) was an American philanthropist, the founder and CEO of the non-profit organizations: "Global Healing" and "Heart to Heart International Children's Medical Alliance" (now "Heart to Heart Global Cardiac Care"), the founder of the Jo Ann Medical Center in Georgia.

== Biography ==
Jo Ann McGowan was born on 18 July 1939, in California, United States. She had been working in Hollywood for many years but has been gradually leaving since 1985.

In 1988, while attending a film festival in St. Petersburg, McGowan, one of the festival's organizers, met a translator whose child had a treatable congenital heart defect. At the time, it was impossible to treat heart disease in St. Petersburg. McGowan brought the girl home to be treated. Following a successful operation in the United States, she decided to open a cardiac surgery clinic in St. Petersburg. Jo Ann returned to Russia in 1989, this time with a team of medical professionals skilled in pediatric cardiac surgery. They ultimately chose St. Petersburg's Children's Hospital 1, as the location of an intensive surgical program for children with congenital heart defects.

She soon led to the establishment of a nonprofit organization dedicated to training cardiac teams in pediatric cardiac surgery throughout Russia. "Heart to Heart International Children's Medical Alliance" (now known as "Heart to Heart Global Cardiac Care") is based in Oakland, California.

McGowan has made significant contributions to Georgia's congenital heart disease treatment system. After meeting with Irakli Metreveli in the United States, McGowan expressed her desire to establish a Georgian counterpart to the existing Children's Cardiac Surgery Center in St. Petersburg. McGowan founded her second nonprofit organization, "Global Healing", to bring pediatric cardiac surgery to the Republic of Georgia.

McGowan died from a heart attack on September 23, 1996, in St. Petersburg, exactly one week after opening the Pediatric Cardiology and Cardiac Surgery Clinic in Georgia. Her organs were used for transplantation, and her ashes were divided into three parts and buried in the yards of the Jo Ann Medical Center Clinic in Tbilisi, California, and St. Petersburg, according to her will. Following Jo Ann's death in 1996, this cardiac center in Tbilisi was renamed the Jo Ann Medical Center in her honor.
