= Karstosphere =

Karstosphere (karst and Ancient Greek: σφαῖρα "sphere") is a geosphere of the karst processes; part of the lithosphere. This is distinctly developed on continental platforms. It represents the Earth's broken shell occupying 35% of its surface and embracing vast areas of continents, as well as a considerable part their underwater elements, including Continental shelf, Continental margin and Continental rise. The Karstosphere consists of two large masses, — Eurasiatic–African and American, which divided by the Pacific and Atlantic Ocean floors and pierced by crystalline shields. It also includes a number of smaller areas, including Australia, Madagascar, New Zealand and other islands. It has the two or more storey architecture and confined to the sedimentary crust and encompassed only some of its formations.

The term and concept "karstosphere" in geographical literature was introduced by Georgian geographer professor Levan Maruashvili (respectively, 1969–70) who defined it as a spatially discontinuous layer composed of the global areas of karstifiable rocks. When discussing the concept of the kartosphere professor Maruashvili proposed the possible existence of karst phenomena within the entire sedimentary mantle of the earth. Levan Maruashvili suggested that karst processes are restricted to sedimentary rocks.

The Karstosphere involves 200 million km² area of the land (accordingly 35% of the surface of Earth) and it also includes other unknown areas under of the ocean level. The maximum entirely thickness of the platform karstosphere is 5–10 km, whereas the thickness on the Caledonides and Variscides exceeds 3–5 km. The karstosphere is also defined as the assemblage of those parts of the sedimentary cover composed of the readily soluble rocks that experience intensive chemical action of waters and which possess the complex of characteristics known as karst.

== See also ==
- Karst
