= Nino Enukidze =

Georgian scientist and rector (born 1986)

- ნინო ენუქიძე

Rector of the Business and Technology University
- Incumbent
- Assumed office 2019

Personal details
- Born: 27 August 1986 (age 40)
- Education: Tbilisi State University; Ilia State University

Nino Enukidze (born August 27, 1986, Tbilisi) is a Georgian scientist, doctor of business administration (2014), and rector of Business and Technology University (since 2019).

== Early life and education ==
Nino Enukidze was born on August 27, 1986, in Tbilisi. In 2006, she graduated from the Faculty of Economics at Tbilisi State University with a bachelor's degree, and later obtained a master's degree in Business Administration from the Georgian-American University.

In 2014, she defended her doctoral dissertation at Ilia State University and was awarded the academic degree of Doctor of Business Administration.

Nino Enukidze studied in 2025 in the executive program at the Harvard Kennedy School - ″Leadership and Public Policy in the 21st Century.″ She has also studied at different times at Maastricht School of Management, Free University of Berlin, and the KTH Royal Institute of Technology.

== Career ==
After working in the private sector, Nino Enukidze joined Ilia State University in 2014, where she held various administrative and academic positions until the establishment of Business and Technology University in 2016. Since 2019, Professor Nino Enukidze has been serving as the Rector of the Business and Technology University. She has received the ″Architect of Tomorrow″ award in the ″Future Architect″ category from Emerging Europe. In 2021 and 2025, she was named among the 200 outstanding leaders in the ″Power Women in Tech Global Edition″.

In 2023–2024, she was a member of the advisory board of the Education and Science Committee of the Parliament of Georgia. In 2024, she was selected as a Young Global Leader by the World Economic Forum.

At the same time, Nino Enukidze is the founder of the Coding School for Women, President of the Academic Consortium of the European Marketing and Management Association, a member of its Honorary Board, and a member of the Business Advisory Board of UNICEF Georgia.
