= Lado Asatiani =

Georgian poet

Vladimer (Lado) Asatiani
- ვლადიმერ [ლადო] ასათიანი
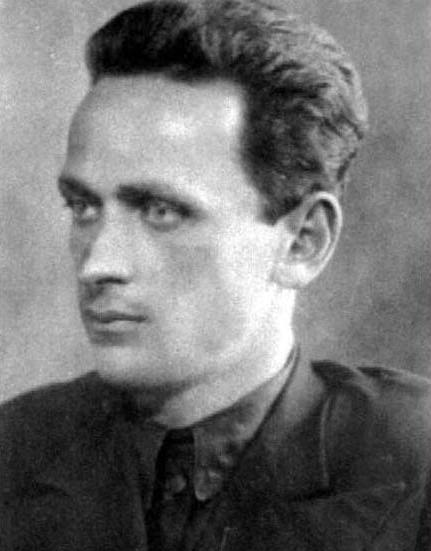
- Lado Asatiani in 1938
- Born: January 14, 1917; Kutaisi, Kutaisi Governorate, Russian Empire
- Died: June 23, 1943 (aged 26); Tbilisi, Georgian SSR, Soviet Union
- Education: Akaki Tsereteli State University
- Occupation: Poet

Vladimer (Lado) Asatiani (Georgian: ვლადიმერ [ლადო] ასათიანი; 14 January 1917 – 23 June 1943) was a Georgian poet. His poetic career, lasting only for seven years, made him one of the best-loved Georgian poets of the 20th century.

== Biography ==
Lado Asatiani was born in Kutaisi, on 14 January 1917, into a family of teachers. He received his secondary education in his native village Bardnala. He successfully graduated from Tsageri Agricultural Technique and became a student of Kutaisi Pedagogical Institute. In 1938 he left Pedagogical Institute. First poem “თებერვლის დილა” was published in 1936 in Kutaisi's newspaper Stalineli. The poet's mother Lida Tskitishvili taught Georgian language. She was arrested because of someone’s denunciation and was deported to Siberia where she would later die. When Lado Asatiani’s first poem was published, he sent his mother the newspaper. At that time, the poet's mother was already dying. The first time she wasn't given the newspaper, but after requesting of Georgian prisoners, they read her son’s poem to Lida.

Since 1938 Lado moved to work and to live in Tbilisi and began working in the newspaper "ნორჩი ლენინელი", which was located opposite the opera. During this time he met his future wife Aniko Vachnadze, who worked as an economist in the writer’s union. At first, Lado met Aniko by chance in the street and sent a letter of anonymous love. In Aniko’s job writers decided to appear author of letter by handwriting. Finally, Revaz Margiani guessed that the author was Lado Asatiani. The love letter was torn to pieces by Aniko and because of this she was very worried.

After their first meeting, Lado Asatiani and Aniko Vachnadze got married in several days. They were introduced each other by close friend Nika Agiashvili. After marriage, first they lived at Aniko’s parents’ house, after they moved to Dzerzhinski Street, in a small room with no windows. Its dwelling-space was only 14 square meters. The room had a glass on the door and the light of day was coming from this way.

The poet got sick as an adult with tuberculosis. At this time consumption was incurable. When he felt bad, he was going to Abastumani. After feeling a little bit well he returned to Tbilisi. He could not walk on the upgrade, so his wife rented a room in hotel “Orient”. Their window was in front of the Lado Gudiashvili’s house. One day the poet told how much he wanted to be his book decorated by Lado Gudiashvili. Aniko told this story to Lado Gudiashvili’s wife. The poet's dream came true, but only after his death. When he died Lado Gudiashvili painted Asatiani’s portrait on the poet’s book.

In the heart of Tbilisi, there is one of the eldest street of the city, which was named after Lado Asatiani.
