= Levan Maruashvili =

Georgian geographer and alpinist

- Born: 25 October 1912; Novocherkassk, Don Host Oblast, Russian Empire
- Died: 5 December 1992 (aged 80); Tbilisi, Georgia
- Citizenship: Soviet
- Education: Tbilisi State University
- Awards: Nikolay Przhevalsky Gold Medal; Vakhushti Bagrationi Prize; State Prize of Georgia
- Scientific career
- Fields: Geography; Geomorphology
- Workplaces: Vakhushti Bagrationi Institute of Geography

Levan Iosifovich Maruashvili (Georgian: ლევან იოსების ძე მარუაშვილი; born 25 October 1912, Novocherkassk, Russian Empire – 5 December 1992, Tbilisi, Georgia) was a prominent Georgian geographer. He was a Doctor of Geographical Sciences (1954), professor, Honored Scientist of the Georgian SSR (1966) and Abkhaz ASSR, and honorary member of the Russian Geographical Society (1985). He introduced a new concept of Karstosphere into the science. Krubera Cave, which is the world’s deepest known cave (2,197 m (7,208 feet)), was discovered by the Georgian researchers in 1960 by the leadership of Professor Levan Maruashvili.

== Biography ==
Levan Maruashvili was born on 25 October 1912 in the town of Novocherkassk of the Don Host Oblast, to the family of engineers and road builder. In 1914, the family moved to Georgia. In 1919, he entered labor school No 2 in Tbilisi. From 1926 to 1930, he studied at Tbilisi Hydro-Technical School and simultaneously worked as a technician-hydrologist with field detachments, in Upper Svaneti. From 1932 to 1933, Maruashvili worked in Kazbegi tourist center. In 1933, he entered the faculty of natural sciences at Tbilisi State University and at the same time collaborated with the Vecherni Tbilisi and the Zarya Vostoka newspapers as a literary man. On graduation from the university in 1938, he began working at Kutaisi Pedagogical Institute as an assistant at the Geographical Department.

In 1941, when the Great Patriotic War broke out, Maruashvili joined the field forces. After graduation from the accelerated courses of Kharkov Commissariat Academy, Maruashvili took part in the battle by the city of Stalingrad defending the ways leading to the Caucasus. From 1943 to 1946, he was in "Stepsgeo" team fighting in high-mountains of the Caucasus and participated in military geographical expeditions in South Georgia. Being demobilized from the army in 1946, in a very short time, he got ready his dissertation - "Karst of fragmental rock, its geomorphological characteristics in the light of general karstology, Central Megrelia as an example (Western Georgia)" and successfully defended his master's degree in 1947.

Since 1947, Maruashvili worked as an assistant professor at Kutaisi Pedagogical Institute, and from 1949 to 1953, took over the Department of Geography at Sokhumi Pedagogical Institute. In 1952, after defending his Doctor's degree on the subject "South-Georgian volcanic upland (structure, relief, historical development)", he made a great contribution to the study of volcanic areas of Alpine-Mediterranean belt, which has not lost its significance up till now.

In 1953, he began working at the Vakhushti Bagrationi Institute of Geography, Georgian Academy of Sciences. At first, he headed the department of Physical Geography and from then onwards the Departments of Geomorphology and Paleogeography until his death. Almost for half a century Levan Maruashvili travelled a lot over his native land and studied its nature. Almost all the branches of Geographical science were elucidated in his works: geomorphology, physical geography, paleogeography, karstology and speleology, history of geographical discoveries et al. In his young years he was fond of mountaineering and conquered tens of peaks and high mountain passes.

== Scientific activities ==
He produced over 500 scientific and popular scientific works in Georgian and Russian languages, among them there are 30 monographs and booklets. The results of his numerous research fields - works in the territory of Georgia and other regions of the Caucasus and the Pamirs are given in these works.

Since 1936, Maruashvili began publishing a series of vivid scientific articles in popular natural scientific journal of Russia the "Priroda" - "Zonality of the Great Caucasus", "Lava plateau of Keli" (geomorphological survey). "Glaciation of the Great Caucasus", "Abskril Cave", "Disappearance of Siveraut glacier", "Volcanic caves of South Georgia" and many others.

In 1959, for the first time he began investigation of periglacial forms, defined their high altitude line and peculiarities of spreading of the major forms of peri-glacial formations on the South-Georgian volcanic upland in the Central Caucasus. In the scientific activity of Maruashvili there may be singled out the following basic branches of Geography, in the study of which be made great contributions: Geomorphology of Georgia, Paleogeography of Georgia and the Caucasus (Neogene-Quaternary period), Regional physical Geography of Georgia and the Caucasus, Karstology and speleology, History of geographical knowledge and travels, Rustvelology and Mountaineering.

In 1975 and 1980, for the first time there was published in Georgian a three-volume work entitled "Physical Geography of the Caucasus". He introduced a new concept of karst-sphere into the science. These and other points were elucidated in the text-book - "Basic of Cave Study: General Speleology" (1973), based on the author's direct observations and analysis of scientific literature. Being the editor-in-chief, Maruashvili took over organization of all field works connected with the fundamental work entitled "Study of Kolkhida Caves" (1978). In 1982 for active participation in producing the "Red Book of Georgia" he was awarded the state Prize of the Georgian SSR.

== Awards ==
Maruashvili was awarded of the Nikolay Przhevalsky Gold Medal (1972) and the Vakhushti Bagrationi Prize (1977). In 1985, he was awarded the state Prize of the Georgian SSR.

== Works ==
- Physical Geography of Georgia, two volumes, (1969-1970);
- Physical Geography of the Caucasus, three volumes, (1975-1986);
- Basic of Cave Study: General Speleology (1973);
- The Paleogeographical Dictionary (1985);
- Geomorphology of Georgia (1971);
- Georgia in Anthropogene (1991).
