= National Atlas of Georgia =

The National Atlas of Georgia was presented at the 70th Frankfurt Book Fair in October 2018. Georgia was the single guest of honor at the book fair; thus more than 60 Georgian novel writers got the chance to have their books translated into German and to visit Germany for a book launch over several months. This first National Atlas of Georgia in the English language gives a comprehensive and contemporary picture of the country with information in introductory text pages for each chapter, followed by hundreds of maps and figures. This required intense interdisciplinary cooperation of all involved scientists during many years of work, and the support of several national institutions in Georgia and Germany.

Georgia was a comparably privileged republic within the Soviet Union due to its agriculture and industry, and the tourist areas on the Black Sea and in the Caucasus mountains. However, knowledge of Georgia was very limited in the Western world until the dissolution of the Soviet Union. Thereafter, the three-year civil war produced a decade of political instability with a long-lasting financial, economic and social crisis. About 1.5 million Georgians have emigrated since 1991, some starting businesses with Georgian products, others opening Georgian restaurants, thus raising interest in Georgia, a country known for its hospitality, wine and cuisine. Today, Georgia has again become an attractive destination for tourism to its historical treasures and unspoiled mountain areas with national parks.

But few people know that there are different languages and ethnic groups in Georgia, that a separate script exists and that Georgia has a history of more than 2000 years. The National Atlas presents detailed information covering all topics for visitors as well as for scientists and business travelers. The detailed table of contents of the National Atlas is bilingual (English and German), and helps to find texts and maps easily.

== Early geographical maps and atlases ==
Cartography has a long tradition in Georgia. Scientific and cartographic depictions of Georgia by Georgian scholars date back to the first half of the 18th century. Prince Vakhushti of Kartli, a family member of King Vakhtang VI (the core region of Georgia), prepared a geographical description of Georgia and adjacent territories as well as geographical atlases. Vakhushti had compiled two manuscript atlases of Georgia, and the maps by Vakhushti evoked strong interest in Russia and Europe. In 1731 the Wissenschaftliche Zeitung (Leipzig) published a report about a "Prinz aus Tiflis" (prince from Tbilisi) who authored remarkable maps of the Caucasus Mountains. The famous French cartographer, Academician Joseph-Nicolas Delisle, had copied a map from Vakhushti's first atlas and published it in 1766 in Paris as "General Map of Georgia and Armenia". The text and part of the maps by Prince Vakhushti were translated into French by Marie-Félicité Brosset in the mid-19th century. In 1947 the map of Kartli and a plan of Tbilisi were printed in Paris.

The originals of Vakhushti's atlases are kept in the archives in Tbilisi. For the 300th anniversary of his birth, the Institute of Geography reprinted in 1997 the Geographical Atlas of Georgia by Vakhushti Bagrationi. In 2013 the “Description of the Kingdom of Georgia” and Bagrationi's "Geographical Atlas" were registered in UNESCO's Memory of the World Programme.

== Linguistic background ==
After the Red Army invasion of Georgia early in 1921, the Democratic Republic of Georgia, which existed from May 1918 to February 1921, lost its independence, and Georgia was part of the Soviet Union until 1991. During this period, some publications in Georgia were printed in Russian language; however, the Georgian language (Kartuli) remained the official state language in government, schools and universities. Georgia achieved this extraordinary status within the USSR thanks to the commitment of Edvard Shevardnadze, native-born Georgian and Soviet foreign minister from 1985 to 1991. After Georgia's independence was restored in 1991, a difficult period with civil wars followed until Edvard Shevardnadze took power in 1995. With the rose revolution, Mikheil Saakashvili took power in November 2003. The opposition party “Georgian Dream” won the 2012 Georgian parliamentary election.

Until today, the Georgian language remains the official language in the administration of the country and in daily life. It is also widely used in science. After 2004, the Russian language has been gradually replaced as the second language by English in schools and universities, and this is strongly supported by the government. However, the older generation of teachers and scientists are Georgian speaking and retain Russian as a second language. Even today, dissertations at universities have usually to be written in Georgian. Considering this linguistic background, it is understandable that the first National Atlas of Georgia that appeared in 2012 was published entirely in Georgian, a language that hardly anyone outside the country can read. It is a masterpiece of cartography with comprehensive information, maps and data on Georgia. At the Frankfurt Book Fair 2018, a Geographical Atlas of Georgia (2018) was presented by the publisher “Palitra L”, again in the Georgian language.

== Political background ==
After 1992 and under the leadership of Eduard Shevardnadze, Georgia established diplomatic relations with other countries and joined major international organizations: the UN (1992), OSCE (1992), Council of Europe (1999), and WTO (2000). In 2002 President Shevardnadze announced Georgia's desire to join NATO. At a NATO summit in 2008 Georgia was promised that in the "future" it would become a member of the alliance. For the vast majority of Georgians, European and Euro-Atlantic perspectives became central to their country's economic and strategic future. Georgia has signed free trade agreements with a number of political entities including the European Union (EU), neighbouring Turkey and faraway China. In 2014 Georgia signed an Association Agreement with the EU together with a Deep and Comprehensive Free Trade Agreement (in force from 2016). And Georgia participates in the EU's "Eastern Partnership" program. In view of this wish for closer connections with Europe, it is understandable that a national atlas of Georgia in English or other western languages was needed.

== The Vakhushti Bagrationi Institute of Geography ==
The outstanding cartographic quality of the 2012 atlas edition stimulated a strong wish on the part of visiting national and international experts for the atlas to be available in English for an international audience. Moreover, and because of the fast development of Georgia in recent years, it was necessary to reassess many maps and tables in the light of the results of the 2014 census and other updated statistics. The Vakhushti Bagrationi Institute of Geography at Tbilisi State University (TSU), which has compiled several atlases in recent decades, agreed to take over the responsibility for this ambitious project for the Frankfurt Book Fair 2018 with Georgia as guest of honor. The basis of the new National Atlas of Georgia (2018) in English remains the Georgian precursor, published in 2012 by Ramin Gobejishvili, an internationally well known physical geographer and team leader., Gobejishvili died in 2014, and his team at the Institute pursued this task. The atlas required several years of preparation.

The institute, named for Vakhushti Bagrationi, was founded in 1933 and has developed a broad experience of cartographic work. Under its guidance several publications have been prepared. The Atlas of Georgian SSR (1964, in Georgian and Russian) was awarded the State Prize of the Georgian SSR in 1971. The Atlas of Resorts and Resort Resources of Georgia (1989, in Georgian, Russian, and English) received the State Prize of Georgia in 1993. The Educational Geographical Atlas of Georgia (1989, in Georgian) was awarded the State Prize of Georgia in 1994. A special achievement was the reprint of the historical Vakhusti Bagrationi Atlas (1997).

== International cooperation and support ==
There has been university cooperation between TSU and Justus-Liebig-University Giessen (JLU) since 2004, especially with Ramin Gobejishvili's Vakhushti Bagrationi Institute of Geography. When the first National Atlas of Georgia was ready for printing, unfortunately again in the Georgian language, the outstanding quality of this atlas convinced the German partners that translating and updating this atlas was essential. Many Georgian scientists were willing to contribute with their latest research results. All in all, more than 100 scientists and cartographers have contributed during years of preparatory work. It resulted in a truly international cooperation: native English speakers from Canada, fascinated by the country of Georgia, checked the English texts with great enthusiasm. Editorial input came from Swiss friends. The new maps, tables and texts contain data from the following Georgian statistical sources: the National Statistics Office of Georgia, the Agency of Protected Areas and the Georgian National Tourism Administration. Thus, the current National Atlas (2018) represents a strongly revised, updated and completed edition. Official information was not available for the temporarily occupied territories of the Abkhazian AR and the Tskhinvali region.

The creation of a comprehensive National Atlas is hardly possible without public support. Cooperation programmes and financial support helped to fulfil this task. Public support on the Georgian side came from the Ministry of Education, Science, Culture and Sport of Georgia, and the former Georgian National Book Centre, Tbilisi. The Ivane Javakhishvili Tbilisi State University was the scientific cooperation partner for JLU, supported by programmes of the Federal Ministry of Education and Research (Germany) (BMBF). The final editing was the result of a close cooperation between all these partners and institutions.

== Presentation at Frankfurt Book Fair 2018 ==
National Vakhushti Bagrationi Prize for the National Atlas of Georgia

The National Atlas of Georgia was released as a contribution to the Frankfurt Buchmesse 2018, where Georgia was the honorary guest country. Displayed alongside a large number of Georgian novels and other books, this atlas depicts Georgia with its diversity, resources and potential for future further development. Over 200 large-format thematic maps and figures provide information on all relevant topics concerning the country. There were several presentations, including lectures by the responsible persons who have helped its publication, e.g. the president of JLU, Joybrato Mukherjee.

This is the first publication of the National Atlas of Georgia in English, and was done to commemorate the 100th anniversary of the foundation of the Ivane Javakhishvili Tbilisi State University. Today, the university is ranked in the top 1.5% of world universities according to TSU, (and U.S. News & World Report) and offers 21 educational programs, including 13 programs where the language of instruction is English. TSU also includes 16 Scientific Research Institutes, such as the Vakhushti Bagrationi Institute of Geography.

== Structure of Atlas ==
The National Atlas reflects most vividly and widely the country's geographical location, environmental conditions, natural and human resources, and economic potential, and their changes over time, and it will contribute to the evaluation and rational use of the country's resource potential. The lead text (pages I to X) consists of prefaces, tables of contents, and an introductory text titled “Georgia – Balcony of Europe and Intersection of Cultures” written by the editors (in English and German). The atlas then opens with the contribution of the well-known former Ambassador of Georgia (to Israel, Armenia, Great Britain and Slovakia), Revaz Gachechiladze, entitled “Georgia in Political Space”. Within the frame of Georgia's location in the mountains of the South Caucasus, it depicts the country's political history from the “Golden Era of the 12th and 13th century” until today with the present governing party of the “Georgian Dream”. The contemplative abstract concludes with the statement: “Contemporary Georgia has . . . . a great potential and by consolidating democracy with a gradual change in the perception of people, the future looks bright”.

The atlas contains the following main sections:

=== Location of Georgia ===
Information is given on the geographic location of Georgia, geopolitical location, political-administrative division. Georgia is mostly perceived by its residents as part of Europe, and is referred to as the "balcony of Europe". Together with the neighboring states of Armenia and Azerbaijan it belongs to the "South Caucasus" and is thus part of the land bridge between the Black and Caspian Seas. As part of the New Silk Road, Georgia is of great importance for goods traffic from China and Central Asia to Europe. Georgia's coastline allows direct ship connections with other coastal states.

=== Physical Geography ===
There are sections on geology, geomorphology, Natural Resources and hazards, climate, hydrology (hydropower resources), glaciers, biogeography with flora and fauna, and soils. The large format of the atlas allows it to show detailed location maps, e.g. for 60 species of mammals, and 133 bird species, together with their distribution areas. As Georgia is covered with geologically young high mountains, geoecological hazards include landslides, mudflows, snow avalanches, floods and inundation, erosion, and earthquakes.

In its physical geography, Georgia enjoys favoured conditions. The Caucasus mountain range in the north forms a major climate division, and a natural barrier protecting the country against the incoming cold air masses from the north. Due to its southern location, Georgia also has a subtropical zone on the Black Sea. Other mountains (the Likhi Range) divide the country into the subtropical west with much precipitation and the dry and sunny east with excellent conditions for viticulture. Due to these rugged and often sparsely populated mountains reaching altitudes of over 5000 meters, Georgia is a world-famous biodiversity hotspot.

=== Georgian Society ===
Georgian society is described in detail, with eight texts depicting its population, cities, economy, tourism, sports, language and national alphabet. All topics are accompanied by maps showing Georgia's population structure and dynamics, its urban and rural population and settlements, ethnicities, internally displaced persons, and the eparchies of the Georgian Orthodox Church. After the collapse of the USSR, the church once again plays an important role in society and in politics.

=== Economy of Georgia ===
The economy of Georgia is depicted with texts and maps covering industry, transport, agriculture and foreign trade. Agriculture has historically been the leading sector of Georgia's economy. Viticulture and winemaking are the oldest traditional fields, as shown by archeological, paleobotanical, ethnological, ampelographic, historical, philological and linguistic studies. The spread of cultured grape vines across the entire territory of Georgia beginning in the 2nd millennium BC has been confirmed by archeological and paleobotanical materials (grape stones and leaf-prints, cellars, pitchers, gold, silver, bronze and clay cups). Among them, the oldest artifact is from the 4th to 3rd millennium BC, which makes it the oldest evidence of viticulture and winemaking in the world. Because of this, Georgia is considered the home of viticulture and winemaking. The National Atlas illustrates in detail the ancient and modern grape varieties and Georgia's viticulture regions in several maps.

=== History of Georgia ===
Historical maps explain the settlement and formation of Georgia's territory, including significant archaeological and architectural monuments over a period of 3000 years. Some large maps covering two pages show Georgia's unique wealth of historical monuments, museums and archaeological sites in detail. A special chapter is dedicated to the Dmanisi archaeological site, where archaeologists obtained important new information on early expansions of hominins out of Africa. In contrast to many early, single findings of the genus homo, the Dmanisi sites offer several skulls, skeletons and stone tools. The age is about 1.8 million years. The discovery of this group of skeletons and tools allows important conclusions concerning the society of the Dmanisi man or homo georgicus.

All atlas texts are written by experts and list scientific references. Some topics are illustrated with spectacular pictures, as shown in the subchapter on karst. The atlas concludes with a list of more than 75 scientists who have contributed, and over 40 individuals, consultants and the technical team at the Vakhushti Bagrationi Institute of Geography, Tbilisi State University (TSU). The comprehensive information given by the National Atlas will assist everyone interested in studying the nature and culture of Georgia, and those who wish to contribute to further developments of Georgia, scientists as well as entrepreneurs and developers. On November 10, 2023, the Georgian National Academy of Sciences distinguished the National Atlas of Georgia with the Vakhushti Bagrationi prize (Laureate Diploma).
