= Tbilisi State Medical University =

Medical university in Tbilisi, Georgia

Coordinates: 41.727389°N 44.753972°E

- თბილისის სახელმწიფო სამედიცინო უნივერსიტეტი
- Motto: Latin: Per traditiones ad futurum
- Type: Public
- Rector: Prof. Irakli Natroshvili
- Administrative staff: 411
- Undergraduates: 7500
- Postgraduates: 3000
- Location: Tbilisi, Georgia
- Campus: Urban
- Website: www.tsmu.edu

Tbilisi State Medical University (TSMU) (Georgian: თბილისის სახელმწიფო სამედიცინო უნივერსიტეტი (თსსუ), romanized: tbilisis sakhelmts'ipo sameditsino universit'et'i (tssu)) is a leading medical university in Tbilisi, Georgia. More than 85 years have passed since Tbilisi State Medical Institute was founded on the basis of the faculty of Medicine at Tbilisi State University (TSU). In 1992 Tbilisi State Medical Institute was renamed in Medical University.

== Rankings and reputation ==
TSMU is the eight ranked (out of 55) higher-education institution in Georgia. There are almost 7500 undergraduate and 3000 postgraduate students at the University about 25% of whom come from foreign countries. Tbilisi State Medical University has undergone Institutional Evaluation Programme, performed by Association of European.

== Executive Board ==
- Rector - Prof. Irakli Natroshvili
- Chancellor - Aleksandre Buachidze
- Vice-rector - Prof. Sophia Bakhtadze
- Vice-rector - Prof. Khatuna Todadze
- Vice-rector - Prof. Zurab Vadachkoria
- Head of Quality Assurance - Prof. Irine Kvatchadze

== Recognition ==
TSMU is recognized by some of the most prominent bodies across the world:

- NMC (National Medical Commission)
- WHO (World Health Organization)
- Ministry of Education, Georgia
- WFME (World Federation for Medical Education)
- ECFMG (Educational Commission for Foreign Medical Graduates)
- FAIMER (The Foundation for Advancement of International Medical Education and Research)

== Duration of MBBS in Tbilisi State Medical University ==
MBBS course at Tbilisi State Medical University runs for a total of 6 years including 1 year of internship. The first 2 years are dedicated to basic theoretical or academic medical education, 1 year to pre-clinical, and the last three years deal with clinical courses.

== Statistics ==
1. The largest medical university in Georgia and Eastern Europe.
2. Founded in 1918.
3. Produced more than 40,000 Doctors.
4. Founder of Eastern European Medical Association
5. Recognized/Listed by World Health Organization, Educational Commission for Foreign Medical Graduates, European Commission for Education, and World Federation of Medical Education.
6. Member of International Association of Universities, European Universities Association.
7. Signatory of Bologna Declaration - European Union Medical Syllabus
8. Graduate, Post Graduate and Research Degrees are available in Surgical, Medical, Dental, Nursing and Pharmacy Fields.

== Notable people ==
=== Alumni ===
- Dimitri Vardanashvili, Georgian activist
- Tsitsino Shurgaya (1981), Georgian surgeon
- Sai Pallavi, Indian Top actress
