= Guram Tavartkiladze Tbilisi Teaching University =

- Other name: Tbilisi State Institute of Economic Relations
- Established: 1992; 33 years ago
- Location: Tbilisi, Georgia
- Coordinates: 41°43′57″N 44°49′18″E
- Website: gttu.edu.ge
- Address 5, Samghereti Str. 0101, Tbilisi, Georgia

Guram Tavartkiladze Tbilisi Teaching University (GTUNI), originally founded as The Tbilisi State Institute Of Economic Relations (TSIER, Georgian: თბილისის სახელმწიფო უნივერსიტეტი ეკონომიკური ურთიერთობები), is a state educational institution in Georgia.

== About ==
GTUNI is a business college. It is based in the capital city of Tbilisi. It has three campuses throughout the country: two in Tbilisi and one in Rustavi and serves more than 3,000 students. GTUNI is accredited by the Ministry Of Education of Georgia.

== History ==
Due to the desire of Dr. Guram Tavartkiladze, the Georgian government, general public, and foreign governments of western countries (primarily Germany and the United States) to establish a business school in Georgia, Tbilisi State Institute of Economic Relations was founded on March 19, 1992 according to the decree of the Ministry of Education of Georgia.

Dr. Guram Tavartkiladze was appointed as its first Rector and President. The main agenda of the institution was to bring up highly qualified business managers to help the country of Georgia, newly independent of the former Soviet Union, to adopt to capitalism and ease transition from command economy to market economy.

As of 2022, its Rector was Giorgi Matiashvili.
