= Telavi Iakob Gogebashvili State University =

Public university in Telavi, Georgia

- Type: State
- Location: (Georgia (country)) Telavi, Kakheti, Georgia; 41°54′36″N 45°28′05″E
- Campus: Urban
- Website: tesau.edu.ge

Iakob Gogebashvili Telavi State University (TESAU) is an educational institution located in Telavi, one of the oldest and picturesque cities in Kakheti, Eastern Georgia. It is named after the eminent 19th-century Georgian writer and educator Iakob Gogebashvili.

By 2026, the university staff includes 21 Professors, 50 Associate Professors, 10 Assistant Professors and 1 Assistant, and the amount of students is around 1500.

== History ==
Telavi State University is considered a "successor" of the Academy of Ikalto of the 12th century, as well as of "Telavi Philosophical and Theological Institutions (1758-1782), Theological Seminary (1782-1801), Theological School (1818-1918), Teachers’ Professional College (1924-1939), Teachers’ Professional Institute (1939-1951) and Pedagogical Institute (1951-1999)".

TESAU was granted "State University" status in 1999 marking the university's 60th anniversary.

== Teaching ==
The university offers Bachelor's, Master's and PhD degrees in various disciplines combined under several faculties.

Bachelor's level:

- Faculty of Education and Humanities;
- Faculty of Agrarian, Natural Sciences and Technologies;
- Faculty of Social Sciences, Business and Law.

Master's level:

- Faculty of Education and Humanities;
- Faculty of Agrarian Sciences;
- Faculty of Educational Sciences;
- Faculty of Exact and Natural Sciences;
- Faculty of Social Sciences, Business and Law.

The PhD level:

- Faculty of Agrarian, Natural Sciences and Technologies;
- Faculty of Social Sciences, Business and Law;
- Faculty of Education and Humanities.

TESAU also offers:

- Integrated Bachelor's and Master's Degree Educational Program for Primary School Teacher Preparation in General Education;
- Teacher training educational programme;
- Georgian Language Preparation Programme.

The primary teaching language at TESAU is Georgian.
