= European University (Georgia) =

Ltd European University
- ევროპის უნივერსიტეტი
- Main entrance to the University
- Other names: EU
- Motto: განათლება ქმნის მომავალს
- Motto in English: "Education Shapes the Future"
- Type: Private
- Established: January 21, 2011; 15 years ago
- Rector: Nino Taliashvili
- Location: Tbilisi, Georgia
- Campus: Urban
- Colours: White and blue
- Website: eu.edu.ge/en

European University (Georgian: ევროპის უნივერსიტეტი) is a university in Tbilisi, Georgia. The university was established in 2011 by Lasha Kandelakishvili. There are three faculties at the European University: Faculty of Law, Education, Business and Technology, Faculty of Medicine, and Faculty of Veterinary Medicine. The current rector of the university is Nino Taliashvili.

== History ==
European University

On January 21, 2011, the university was certified for 5 years by the Board of Authorization of Higher Education Institutions. Certification was renewed multiple times, with the current 6-year accreditation being dated June 16, 2021. The maximum number of students is 3,500. The university began offering an Integrated Master’s Educational Program in Veterinary in 2022.

From 29 October 2021 European University is an individual associate member of the European University Association.

The university offers 16 higher educational programs, each of which is accredited by the Higher Education Accreditation Board, including the English Language Education Program for Graduate Physicians.

European University has two campuses as well as a dormitory. The university has a logo, seal, and title page, approved by the Rector.

In 2022, European University has become the owner of Jo Ann Medical Center which was renamed Jo Ann University Hospital. The hospital will be chaired by Tamar Zarginava, Vice-Rector of the European University.

== Study programs ==
The university includes three faculties, each of which offers educational programs in Georgian and/or English.

=== The Faculty of Law, Education, Business and Technology ===
The core educational unit of the university is the Faculty of Law, Education, Business, and Technology. The dean of the faculty is Ioseb Kelenjeridze.

The Faculty of Law, Education, Business, and Technology offers 10 educational programs.

Bachelor's degree programs:

- Business Administration
- Tourism
- Law
- Informatics
- International Relations

Master's degree programs:

- Management
- Education Administration

Integrated Education Programs:

- Integrated (Bachelor-Master) Educational Program of Secondary Education Teachers of Mathematics
- Integrated (Bachelor-Master) Educational Program of Secondary Education Teachers of Chemistry, Physics and Biology

Teaching training program

=== The Faculty of Medicine ===
The Faculty of Medicine has been operating since 2014. The dean of the faculty is Natia Jojua.

The Faculty of Medicine conducts 5 educational programs:

One-Cycle Undergraduate Medical Education:

- Medical Doctor program MD in the Georgian language
- Medical Doctor program MD in the English language
- Dental Medicine program in Georgian language
- Dental Medicine program in English language

Bachelor's degree program:

- Psychology

=== The Faculty of Veterinary Medicine ===
The Faculty of Veterinary Medicine was established in 2019. The first batch of students entered the faculty in 2022. The dean of the faculty is Vazha Kvachrelishvili. The faculty offers Integrated Master's Educational Program in Veterinary.

== Organisation and management ==
Lasha Kandelakishvili has been the Rector of European University from 2012 until October 31, 2019. Nino Taliashvili has served as the university's rector since 2019. Vice-Rector for International Relations is Tamar Zarginava and Vice-Rector for Quality Enhancement is Sophio Khundadze. The governing body of the university is The Governing Board of European University.

=== Administration ===
- President ― Lasha Kandelakishvili
- Rector ― Nino Taliashvili

== Research ==
Logo of the Scientific Research Institute of Law

At the European University, international peer-reviewed publications are published by four different scientific research institutes:

=== Scientific Research Institute of Law ===
In 2015, with the Faculty of Law, Education, Business and Technology of the European University Scientific Research Institute of Law was established. The periodical of the European University Institute of Law is the international refereed and peer-reviewed journal "Law and World". Scientific quality academic articles of the legal field are published in the journal in Georgian, English, French, German and Spanish languages with mandatory resumes in English.

The Institute of Law has hosted international scientific conferences: "Current Problems of Justice and Ways to Solve Them" (2015),"Modern Trends in Criminal Science" (2016), "Actual Problems of Justice" (2018, 2019, 2020), and "Actual Problems of Justice: Juvenile Justice" (2021).

=== Scientific Research Institute of Economic and Social Issues of Globalization ===
The Research Institute of Economic and Social issues of Globalization was founded in 2016. The Faculty of Law, Education, Business and Technology of European University and the institute issue an international peer-reviewed scientific-practical journal "Globalization and Business", where articles are focused on the business and actual problems of innovative and technological processes of Georgia's and other countries' social-economic development under the modern conditions of globalization. The Institute cooperates with Ivane Javakhishvili Tbilisi State University and Saint Andrew the First-Called Georgian University of the Patriarchate of Georgia.

=== Medical Research Institute ===
Medical Research Institute of European University was founded in 2020 on the basis of the "National Center for Tuberculosis and Lung Diseases" (NCTBLD). 4 scientists are working in the Medical Research Institute, whose director is professor Zaza Avaliani. The institute publishes an international peer-reviewed journal, "Biomedical and Core Clinical Research Practice".

=== Andria Apakidze Institute of Archaeology ===
Academician Andria Apakidze Institute of Archeology together with the Historical-Archaeological Museum of the European University publishes the scientific-research journal "Archaeology".

The Historical-Archaeological Museum of the university is responsible to the Rector and the purpose of the museum is to search for, purchase, protect, preserve, restore, conserve, exhibit, and popularize exhibits.

== Academic rankings ==
Times Higher Education Impact Rankings ranked the European University 1001+ in the world in 2022. The European University is Georgia's only university listed in the Times Higher Education Impact Rankings 2022.

== Student life ==
The European University futsal team was formed in 2016. On students' suggestion, the EU Choreographic Ensemble was founded in 2015. Since its establishment, the ensemble has performed 12 dances featuring contemporary choreographic features. In 2018, the EU girls' volleyball team was founded and in 2019, the EU foreign girls' basketball team was created.

== See also ==
- List of universities in Georgia (country)
- Kutaisi University
