= Business and Technology University =

- ბიზნესისა და ტექნოლოგიების უნივერსიტეტი
- Type: Private
- Established: 2016; 10 years ago
- Rector: Nino Enukidze
- Students: 5500 (over)
- Location: Tbilisi, Georgia; 41.7064°N 44.7384°E
- Website: btu.edu.ge/en/home-english/
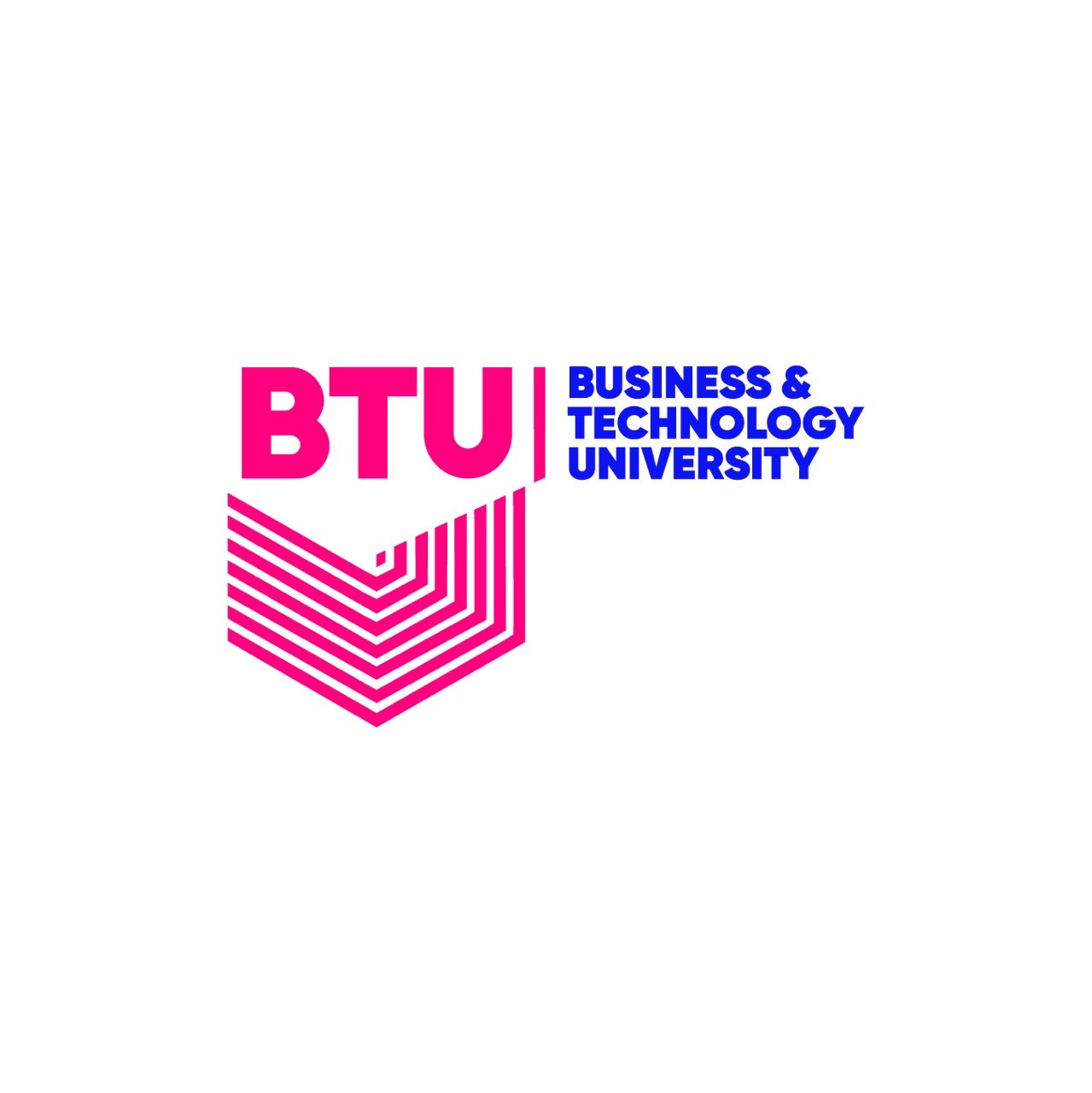

Business and Technology University (BTU) (Georgian: ბიზნესისა და ტექნოლოგიების უნივერსიტეტი) is a private higher education institution based in Tbilisi, Georgia, founded on September 16, 2016. It is authorized as a higher education institution in Georgia by the National Center for Educational Quality Enhancement (NCEQE).

== History ==
Business and Technology University (BTU) was founded on September 16, 2016. It is authorized by the National Center for Educational Quality Enhancement, operating under the Ministry of Education, Science and Youth of Georgia. BTU integrates academic and scientific activities with a strong focus on innovation, technology, and entrepreneurship-oriented education.

In 2024, Business and Technology University began constructing a new campus. In 2025, the university opened a new, second campus.

Nino Enukidze is the rector.

== Study programs ==
Business and Technology University offers all three academic levels bachelor’s, master’s, and doctoral programs in Georgian and English languages.

The following bachelor’s programs are offered: Business Administration (Management), Business Administration (Finance), Business Administration (In English), Digital Marketing, Information Technology, Computer Science and Artificial Intelligence (In Georgian and English languages), and Psychology in the Digital World.

BTU administers Master's programs in Business Administration and Modern Technologies, Information Systems Management (DevOps), International Security and Technologies, and Data-Driven Digital Marketing. Executive education programs in Business Administration and Digital Marketing.

At the doctoral level: Business Administration, Digital Governance and Artificial Intelligence in the Public Sector.

== Admission ==
Admission to undergraduate programmes at Business and Technology University is conducted through Georgia’s Unified National Examinations. Admission to master’s programmes requires applicants to pass the Unified Postgraduate Examination and complete the university’s internal admission procedures, which include demonstrating English language proficiency and attending an interview or taking a specialty examination. Additionally, for Executive Master’s programmes, applicants must demonstrate at least 5 years of professional experience in the field. Doctoral admission procedures are established and published separately by the university. In accordance with Georgian legislation, international applicants may enroll without passing the Unified National Exams. This simplified pathway is available for foreign citizens and stateless persons who received their full general (or equivalent) education abroad.

== International recognition ==
Among multiple international awards, BTU has been named as a “Trainer of the Year in Europe” by EIT Digital. Business and Technology University’s initiative AI4Globe, focused on artificial intelligence literacy, has been recognized by UNESCO and included among the initiatives associated with the International Decade of Sciences for Sustainable Development (IDSSD, 2024-2033). In addition, BTU’s Coding School for Women project has received multiple international acknowledgments, including recognition in the “Future-Proof Education” category by Emerging Europe in both 2021 and 2023.
