= Alexander Javakhishvili =

Georgian and Soviet geographer

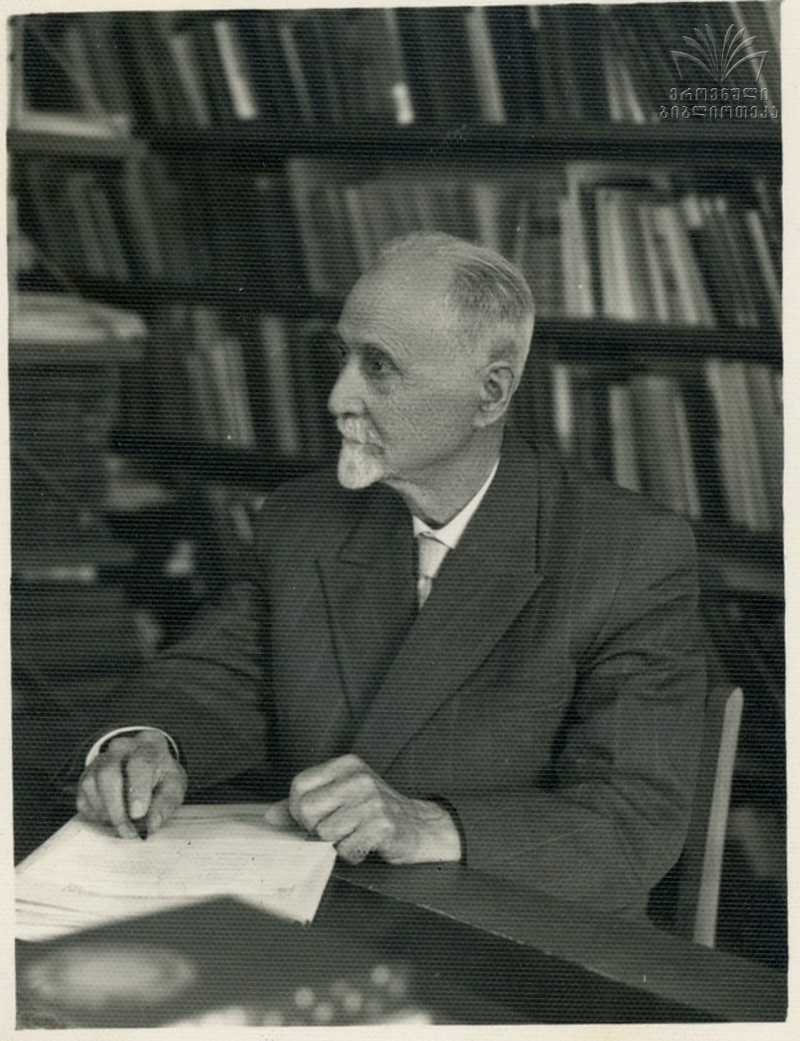
- Born: Alexander Nikolayevich Javakhishvili; August 17, 1875; Gori, Georgia
- Died: January 22, 1973 (aged 97); Tbilisi, Georgia
- Citizenship: Soviet
- Education: Moscow State University
- Scientific career
- Fields: Geography, anthropology

Alexander Nikolayevich Javakhishvili (Georgian: ალექსანდრე ნიკოლოზის ძე ჯავახიშვილი;) born 17 August 1875, in Gori, Georgia – died January 22, 1973, Tbilisi, Georgia) was a Soviet and Georgian geographer and anthropologist.

Professor A. N. Javakhishvili was one of the oldest geographers and anthropologists in the Soviet Union. He was the founder of Soviet Georgian geography which, under him, developed into a school. His qualifications and awards include Doctor of Sciences (1937), recognition as an Academician of the Georgian Academy of Sciences (1944), a Merited Scientist, an honorary member of the USSR Geographic Society, and winner of a State Prize of the Georgian SSR.

== Biography ==
Javakhishvili was born on 5 August (17 August New Style), 1875, in the town of Gori, into a government official's family. Javakhishvili began his schooling in Tbilisi at the Georgian Gymnasium for sons of the gentry.

Leaving the Georgian Gymnasium in 1887, he pursued his studies at the Second Classical Gymnasium for Boys in Tbilisi. In 1895 he completed the course, winning a gold medal and the right to a state grant at Moscow University where he became a student of physics and mathematics in its sub-department of Natural Sciences.

In 1900 Javakhishvili graduated from the Department of Physics and Mathematics with honours and was invited to remain at the University to prepare for a professorship. As early as in 1899 he began to work as an assistant in organic chemistry in which he was particularly interested at the time.

== Scientific activities ==
His research, to which he devoted many years of his life, solved the cardinal problems of anthropology of the contemporary population of the Caucasus; the results of his investigations became widely known in the scientific world. He was a born scientist, and, owing to his exceptional purposefulness, his numerous works covered almost all the geographical problems of Georgia: geomorphology, cartography, the geographical distribution of the population, problems dealing with various peculiarities of the land and its people, and the varied terrain of the country; neither did the history of geography of Georgia escape his attention.

The theoretical works of Javakhishvili are a significant contribution to Soviet geographical science; among these are publications devoted to the structure of this science, to the interrelations between sciences composing general geography and to their links with adjacent sciences, making part of the geography of the Earth.

The amount of work Javakhishvili did for the benefit of science and knowledge is more than one man could normally be expected to do; therefore he can be regarded, together with Vakhushti Bagrationi, as the founder of geography in Georgia.

== Awards ==
In 1955 the Ministry of Education of the Georgian SSR awarded Javakhishvili the badge "Excellent Educationalist". The Soviet Government highly appreciated Javakhishvili's scientific and public activities and awarded him the Order of Lenin, the Order of the Red Banner of Labour twice, and the Medal For Valiant Labour in the Great Patriotic War 1941–1945."

== Works ==
- საქართველოს გეოგრაფია, ტ. 1 - გეომორფოლოგია (ატლასით), ტფ., 1926;
- საქართველოს სსრ ფიზიკური გეოგრაფია (სახელმძღვანელო 7 კლასისთვის), გამოც. 35-ე, თბ., 1983;
- Антропология Грузии (т. 1‒2, 1908‒14);
- Геоморфологические районы Грузинской ССР. М-Л., 1947;
- К структуру географической науки, 1956.

== Literature ==
- Джаошвили В., Кверенчхиладзе P., А. Н. Джавахишвили (к 90-летию со дня рождения), «Изв. Всесоюзного географического общества», 1965. (in Russian)
