= Feofan Davitaia =

Georgian geographer

- Born: September 2 (15) 1911; Eki village, now Senaki Municipality
- Died: 29 July 1979 (aged 67); Tbilisi, Georgia
- Citizenship: Soviet
- Education: Tbilisi State University
- Scientific career
- Fields: Geography, Climatology, agrometeorology

Feofan Farneevich Davitaia (Georgian: თეოფანე ფარნას ძე დავითაია; 2 (15) September 1911, in village Eki, now Senaki Municipality, Georgia – 29 July 1979, in Tbilisi, Georgia) was a Georgian geographer, climatologist and agrometeorologist. doctor of agricultural sciences (1951), academician of the Academy of Sciences of the Georgian SSR (1960), Honored Scientist of the Georgian SSR (1966). Became a member of the CPSU in 1939. Davitaia was professor of the universities of Leningrad (1950–1951) and Moscow (1955–1961). In Moscow, for several years he also delivered lectures at the Courses for the improvement of professional skill at the Central Board of Hydrometeorological Service, USSR Council of Ministers. From 1963, Davitaia continued educational work at Tbilisi State University, directing a large number of postgraduates who successfully developed his ideas in their research.

For 15 years, Davitaia was a member of the Scientific and Technological Council of the USSR Ministry of Agriculture; he took an active part in the work of the State Commission for the strain testing of agricultural crops on the territory of our vast country. He participated in the preparation of the many-volume fundamental edition "Ampelography of the USSR".

== Biography ==
Feofan Davitaia was born on 15 September 1911 in the mountainous village of Eki, Tskhakaia district, Georgia, where he went to elementary school. From 1909 Davitaia's father worked in Poti as a stevedore. Later his large family also moved to Poti.

In 1927 Feofan Davitaia finished secondary school in Poti, and on the recommendation of the town YCL Committee was given the job of loader of manganese ore at the Poti port. After entering Tbilisi University in 1928, Davitaia combined his study with work at the Weather Bureau of the Tbilisi Geophysical Observatory. While a postgraduate student, Davitaia came out with a number of initiative suggestions on the organization of scientific work. Of these, mention should be made of his well-founded suggestion-published In the Izvestia newspaper—on the setting up of a Scientific Committee attached to the Government of the USSR.

In 1936, Davitaia successfully defended his thesis for a candidate’s degree on the "Climatic Zones of the Vine in the USSR", which was published as a monograph in 1938.

By 1950 Davitaia summed up his research in his monograph "Study of the Climates of the Vine in the USSR and the Bases of their Practical Use", which he defended brilliantly as a doctoral thesis In agricultural sciences. The monograph, published in 1952, has become a deskbook of viticulturists, winemakers, and agriclimatologists.

In 1964-1965 Davitaia worked at the Academy of Sciences of Cuba directing a group of Soviet consulting scientists engaged in a study of the country’s natural resources. Jointly with Soviet and Cuban scientists, he conducted extensive work for the preparation of a national atlas of Cuba. As a result of processing the materials of long-term meteorological observations Davitaia wrote a scientific monograph, "Climatic Resources of Cuba", which was published (jointly with I. I. Trusov) in Spanish (Havana, 1965). A somewhat modified version of that monograph was published in Tbilisi in Russian (1966). This book was highly appraised in a number of published reviews, including one in the United States. To mark this important event in the scientific life of the Republic of Cuba, in 1965 the Cuban Academy of Sciences conferred on Davitaia the title of cofounder of the Institute of Geography in Havana, presenting him with a diploma. Davitaia’s Scientific missions abroad were combined with geographical excursion-expeditions. Among them particularly fruitful in the scientific respect were his travels in Brazil, Cuba, the United States, Ireland, and the PRC. The results of those travels were used in developing the climatic criteria for the identification.

In 1967-1968, at the invitation of the University of Wisconsin, Davitaia delivered a course of lectures on contemporary problems of climatology and agrometeorology for the postgraduates and professors of the Department of Geography. During his stay in the USA Davitaia published papers in American scientific journals; his monograph, "Methods of Agricultural Assessment of Climate", was published in the same period.

The numerous articles and papers contributed by Davitaia to newspapers and popular magazines reflected the achievements of Soviet agrometeorology and geography, making this evidence available to broad sections of the public. In 1972, at the 22nd World Geographical Congress (Canada), Feofan Davitaia was elected Vice-President of the International Geographical Union. At the 1976 International Congress in Moscow Davitaia was again elected to this high post. At that Congress he directed the work of the section of climatology, hydrology, glaciology, and oceanography. At the XIV Geographical Congress of Czechoslovakia (1978) Davitaia read a paper on the topic "Present-day Problems of Geography". At that Congress he was elected an honorary member of the Czechoslovak Geographical Society.

in 1978, Davitaia directed the UNESCO Project 6/1—"Man and Biosphere". In the same year, at the invitation] of the international Geographical Union, he participated in a conference on regional geography in Nigeria. In the same year Davitaia was one of the organizers of a Soviet-Indian Symposium in Tbilisi on the study of regional geographic problems, as well as of a Bulgarian-Soviet Field Symposium.

For his scientific studies Feofan Davitaia was awarded the All-Union Prize and Diploma of the USSR Academy of Sciences and the All-Union Leninist Youth League (1938), the prizes and first class diplomas of the Leningrad Regional Committee of the LYCLSU (1939), the prizes oi the USSR Ministry of Food Industry (1949) and of the All-Union Lenin Academy of Agricultural Sciences (1948), the A. I. Voeykov Prize twice (in 1956 and 1959), the Large Silver (1962t and Gold Medals of the USSR Exhibition of the Achievements of the National Economy, and others. In 1971 he was awarded the State Prize of the Georgian SSR: on 20 February 1972 he was awarded the Diploma and Gold Medal of the Academy of Sciences of Cuba. In 1973 Davitaia was awarded the State Prize of the USSR for his participation in the compilation of the National Atlas of Cuba.

In 1980, Feofan Davitaia was posthumously elected honorary member of the Cuban Speleological Society for his outstanding services and great contribution to the development of Cuban geography.

Feofan Davitaia’s services have been recognized by the award of five orders, twelve medals, and governmental and scientific decorations.

Davitaia’s scientific and public activities were a model of selfless service of his fatherland. His scientific investigations had a considerable influence on the development of Soviet geography, climatology, agricultural meteorology and a number of other sciences.
