= Akaki Tsereteli State University =

University in Kutaisi, Georgia

- აკაკი წერეთლის სახელობის სახელმწიფო უნივერსიტეტი
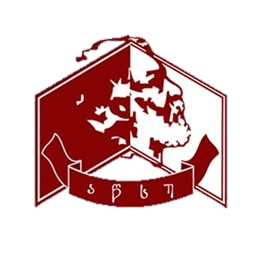
- Other name: ATSU
- Type: Public
- Established: 1930; 96 years ago
- Rector: Rolandi Kopaliani
- Faculty: 5000
- Location: Kutaisi, Georgia; 42.2645°N 42.7106°E
- Campus: Urban
- Colours: Red & white
- Website: www.atsu.edu.ge

Akaki Tsereteli State University (Georgian: აკაკი წერეთლის სახელობის სახელმწიფო უნივერსიტეტი, romanized: ak'ak'i ts'eretlis sakhelobis sakhelmts'ipo universit'et'i), also known as Kutaisi University (Georgian: ქუთაისის უნივერსიტეტი, romanized: kutaisis universit'et'i), is a university established in July 1930 in Tbilisi, Georgia, and now located in Kutaisi.

== History ==
Main campus

The university was established on the basis of Tbilisi State University. Tbilisi State University had been founded under guidance of Georgian historian Ivane Javakhishvili in 1918. In July 1930, when Georgia had already fallen under Soviet rule, the authorities abolished Tbilisi State University, creating four independent institutions in its place. State Pedagogical Institute was one of those universities.

On January 8, 1933, Tbilisi State University was re-established and State Pedagogical Institute moved to Kutaisi. Now named Kutaisi University and located in the center of the city, it started functioning from February 13, 1933. Up to 700 students moved to Kutaisi from Tbilisi to continue their studies at the university.

In 1990, the university was transformed into Akaki Tsereteli State University, being named after Georgian poet and national liberation movement figure Akaki Tsereteli. On February 23, 2006, the authorities merged the university with Kutaisi N. Muskhelishvili Polytechnic Institute which was founded on September 1, 1974, enhancing its faculty and curriculum on technical subjects.

== Faculties ==
As of 2019, the Akaki Tsereteli State University operated the following faculties:

- Faculty of Humanitarian
- Faculty of Pedagogics
- Faculty of Exact and Natural sciences
- Faculty of Business, Law and Social sciences
- Faculty of Medicine
- Faculty of Technical Engineering
- Faculty of Technological Engineering
- Faculty of Agriculture
- Faculty of Maritime-transportation

== Alumni ==
- Dimitri Vardanashvili
- Lado Asatiani

== See also ==
- Kutaisi University
- Tbilisi State University
