= Theodosius II of Abkhazia =

9th-century Georgian king

Theodosius II თეოდოს II

King of Abkhazia
- Reign: 828–855
- Predecessor: Leon II
- Successor: Demetrius II
- Dynasty: Anchabadze

Theodosius II (Georgian: თეოდოს II) was King of the Abkhazia from circa 828 to 855. He was the son and successor of Leon II of the Anchabadze dynasty.

== Life ==
Theodosius II supported his relative Ashot I of Iberia, ruler of Tao-Klarjeti, against Principality of Kakheti and its ally Arab emir of Tiflis, that invaded Inner Iberia (Shida Kartli), as a result Kakhetians were pushed from central Iberian lands to east of the Ksani River. In 837, Byzantine Emperor Theophilos sent patrikios Bardas together with the general Theophobos in a campaign against the Abkhazians, but the Byzantines were defeated.

Theodosius II died without heir and he was succeeded by his younger brother Demetrius II of Abkhazia, who disputed the throne for many years.

== Genealogy ==
Genealogy of the Kings of Abkhazia

Theodor; Archon of Abasgia r. 710's–730
Constantine II; Archon of Abasgia r. 730–745 | Leon I Archon of Abasgia r. 745–767
Leon II; Archon of Abasgia r. 767–780; King of Abkhazia r. 780–828
Theodosius II; King of Abkhazia r. 828–855 | Demetrius II; King of Abkhazia r. 855–864 | George I King of Abkhazia r. 864–871
Tinen of Chikha | Bagrat I King of Abkhazia r. 882–894
Constantine III; King of Abkhazia r. 894–923
Anonymous daughter married to Ashot of Klarjeti | George II; King of Abkhazia r. 923–957 | fr:Bagrat Anchabadzé; King of Abkhazia r. 923–930
Constantine; Duke of Kartli r. 923–926 | Leon III; Duke of Kartli r. 926–957; King of Abkhazia r. 960–969 | Demetrius III; King of Abkhazia r. 969–976 | Theodosius III; King of Abkhazia r. 976–978 | Bagrat | Anonymous daughter married to Shourta of Kakheti | Gurandukht married to Gurgen of Iberia | Anonymous daughter married to Abas I of Armenia
Bagrat II; King of Abkhazia r. 978–1014

== Sources ==
- Marie-Félicité Brosset, Histoire de la Géorgie.
- Kazhdan, Alexander, ed. (1991). The Oxford Dictionary of Byzantium. Oxford and New York: Oxford University Press. ISBN 0-19-504652-8.
- Lilie, Ralph-Johannes; Ludwig, Claudia; Zielke, Beate; Pratsch, Thomas, eds. (2013). "Prosopographie der mittelbyzantinischen Zeit Online". Prosopographie der mittelbyzantinischen Zeit Online. Berlin-Brandenburgische Akademie der Wissenschaften. Nach Vorarbeiten F. Winkelmanns erstellt (in German). De Gruyter.
- Suny, Ronald Grigor (1994). The Making of the Georgian Nation. Indiana University Press. ISBN 0-253-20915-3.

| Preceded by Leon II | King of Abkhazia; 828–855 | Succeeded by Demetrius II |
