= Constantine III of Abkhazia =

King of the Abkhazia

Constantine III კონსტანტინე III

King of Abkhazia
- Reign: 894 – 923
- Predecessor: Bagrat I
- Successor: George II
- Dynasty: Anchabadze
- Religion: Georgian Orthodox Church

Constantine III (Georgian: კონსტანტინე III) was King of Abkhazia from c. 894 to 923 AD. He was the son and successor of Bagrat I of the Anchabadze dynasty.

== Life ==
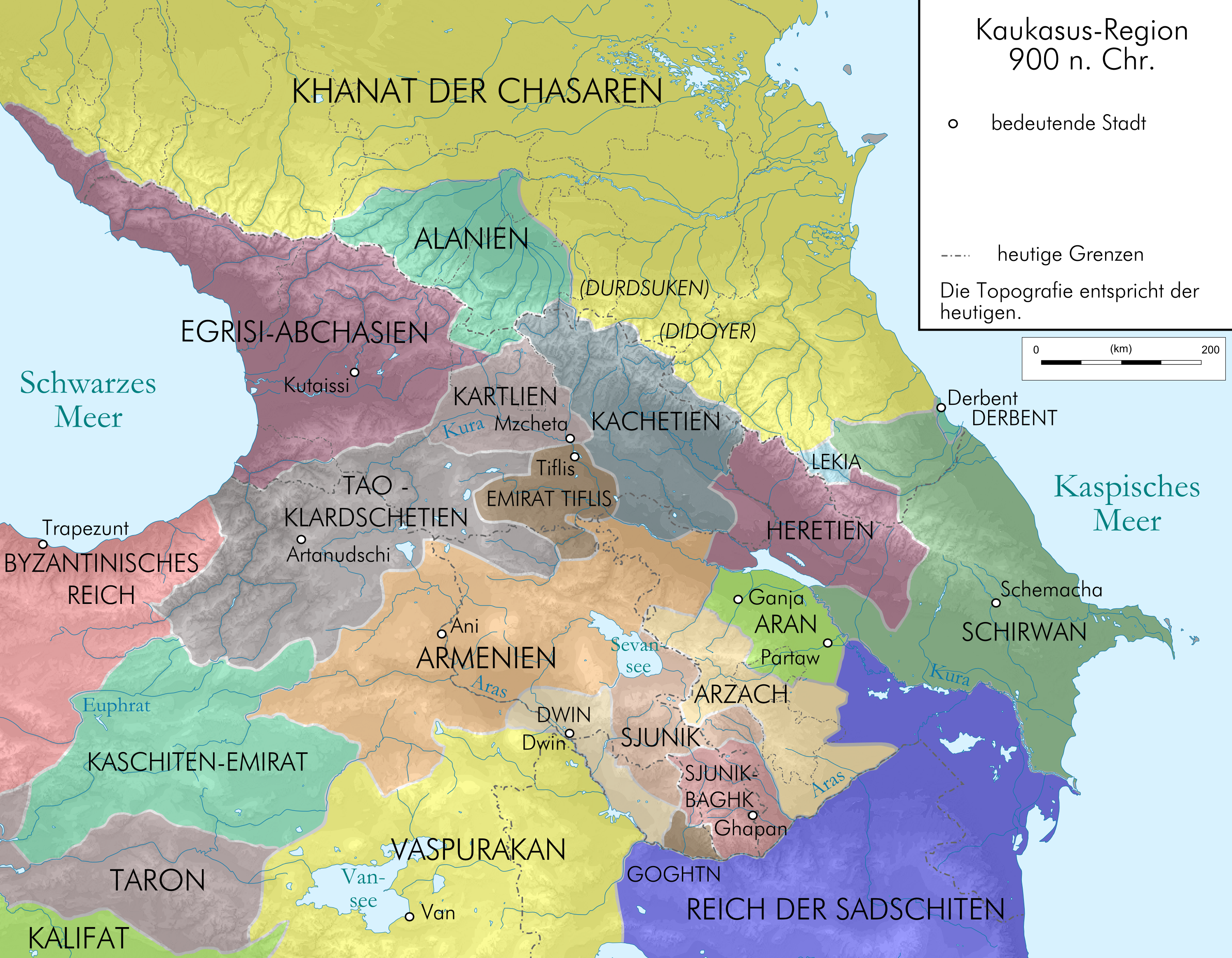
Map of Kingdom of Abkhazia and neighbouring countries around 900 AD.

Constantine's reign is marked as a constant fighting for the hegemony within the Georgian territories. The increasingly expansionist tendencies of the kingdom led to the enlargement of its realm to the east. In 904 he had finally annexed a significant portion of Kartli, bringing his borders close to the Arab-controlled Tiflis (modern-day Tbilisi).

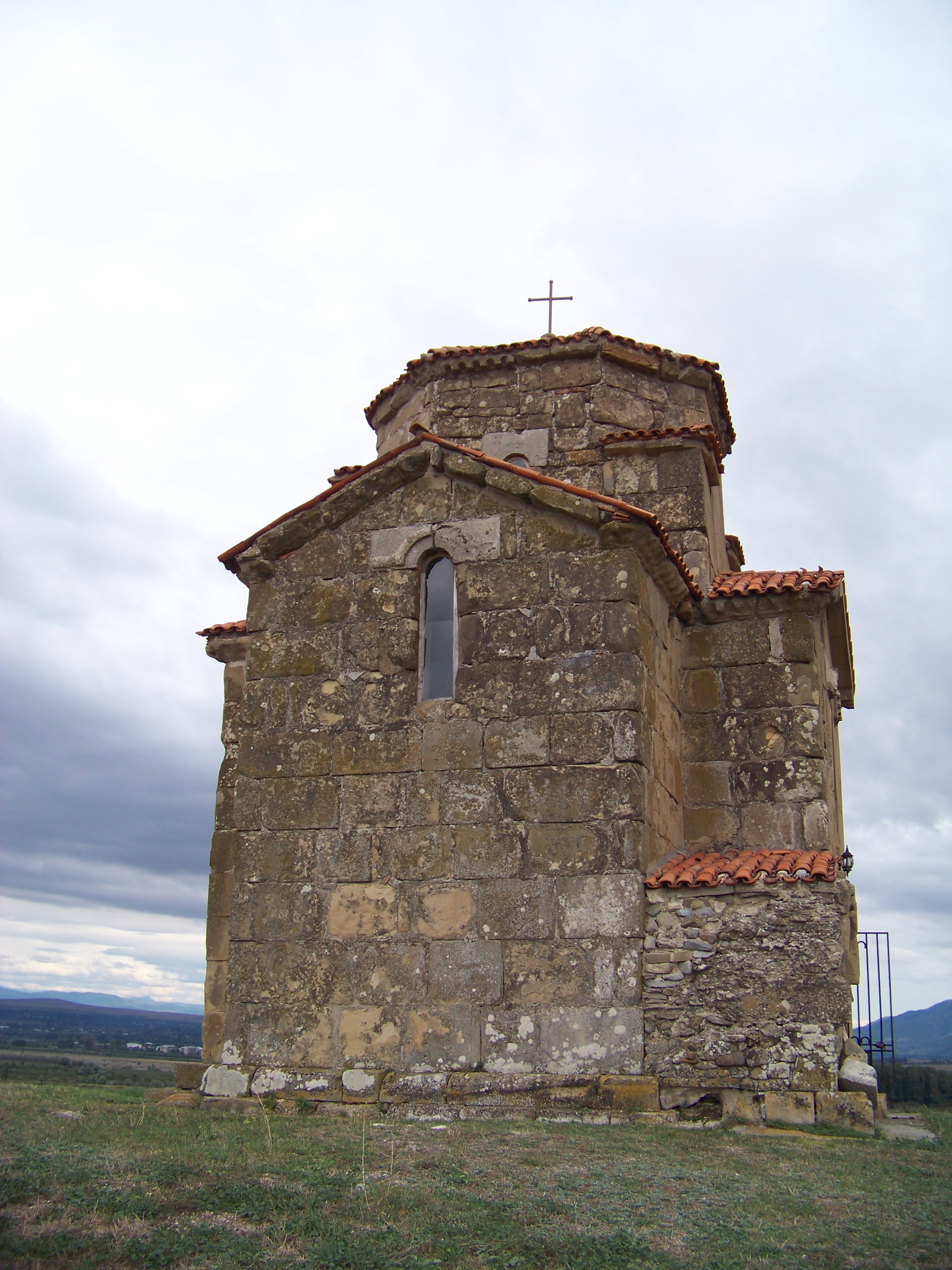
Samtsevrisi church. An inscription from the church mentions Constantine III of Abkhazia.

Soon he had to face the alliance of the King Smbat I of Armenia and Adarnase IV of Iberia. The two men collaborated in defeating Constantine III, their common relative, who competed with Adarnase for hegemony in Inner Iberia and with Smbat in Gugark. Adarnase captured Constantine and turned him over to Smbat. Constantine was imprisoned in Ani. Smbat freed his captive in order to make an alliance against the resurgent Muslims. This alliance was facilitated by Constantine's marriage to the Smbat's daughter. This move, however, turned Adarnase against Smbat. In 912, when Emir Yusuf ibn Abi'l-Saj invaded Armenia, Smbat attempted to take refuge in Abkhazia, but Adarnase did not let him cross his territories and was eventually captured and hanged at Dvin (914). Subsequently, Yusuf ibn Abi'l-Saj took the opportunity to devastate the Tao-Klarjeti. This campaign was one of the last major attempts on the part of the Abbasid Caliphate to retain its crumbling hold of the Georgian lands, which, at that time, were a patchwork of rival, native states and Muslim holdings. As a result of the campaign, Tao-Klarjeti was weakened. Constantine III used Adarnase's weakness and restored his authority over Kartli. Adarnase was relegated to his portion of the Bagratid hereditary lands in Tao and was forced to recognize himself as a vassal of Constantine III. This was the beginning of almost sixty years of Abkhazian dominance over Tao-Klarjeti. Next year, Constantine forged an alliance with Kvirike I of Kakheti. The allies invaded Hereti (principality in the Georgian-Albanian marchlands) and divided its major strongholds.

Constantine III also tried to extend his influence over Alania by supporting their Christianization.

== Family ==
Constantine III married a daughter of Adarnase IV of Iberia:

=== Issue ===
- Anonymous daughter, married to Ashot of Klarjeti
- George II, king of Abkhazia from 916 until 960.
- Bagrat II, co-king of Abkhazia.

== Genealogy ==
Genealogy of the Kings of Abkhazia

Theodor; Archon of Abasgia r. 710's–730
Constantine II; Archon of Abasgia r. 730–745	Leon I Archon of Abasgia r. 745–767
Leon II; Archon of Abasgia r. 767–780; King of Abkhazia r. 780–828
Theodosius II; King of Abkhazia r. 828–855	Demetrius II; King of Abkhazia r. 855–864	George I King of Abkhazia r. 864–871
Tinen of Chikha	Bagrat I King of Abkhazia r. 882–894
Constantine III; King of Abkhazia r. 894–923
Anonymous daughter married to Ashot of Klarjeti	George II; King of Abkhazia r. 923–957	fr:Bagrat Anchabadzé; King of Abkhazia r. 923–930
Constantine; Duke of Kartli r. 923–926	Leon III; Duke of Kartli r. 926–957; King of Abkhazia r. 960–969	Demetrius III; King of Abkhazia r. 969–976	Theodosius III; King of Abkhazia r. 976–978	Bagrat	Anonymous daughter married to Shourta of Kakheti	Gurandukht married to Gurgen of Iberia	Anonymous daughter married to Abas I of Armenia
Bagrat II; King of Abkhazia r. 978–1014

== Sources. ==
- Marie-Félicité Brosset, Histoire de la Géorgie..

Preceded by Bagrat I	King of Abkhazia; 894–923	Succeeded by George II
