= Leon III of Abkhazia =

10th-century Georgian king

Leon III ლეონ III
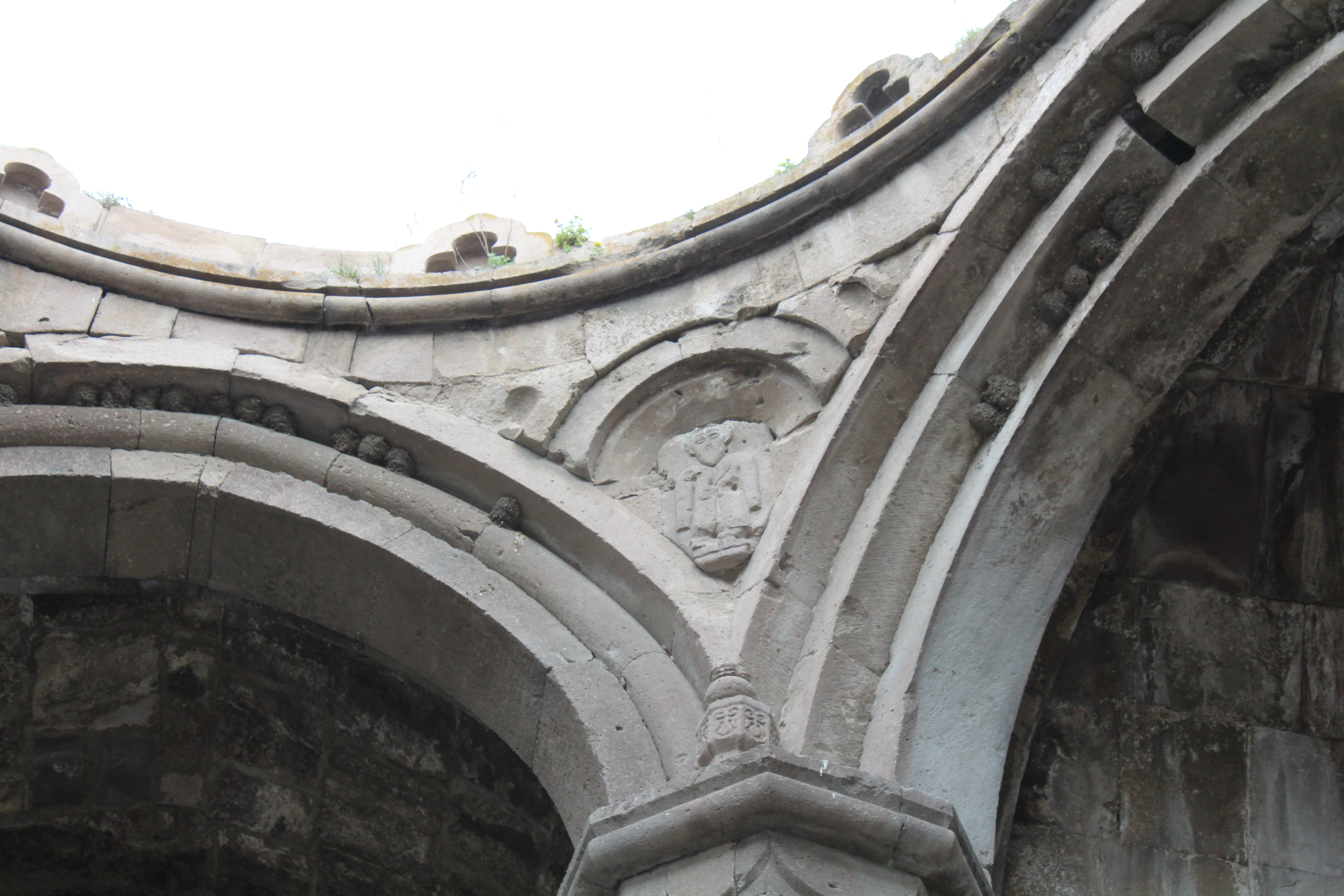
- Leon's relief from the squinch over arch from the Kumurdo Cathedral, c. 964

King of Abkhazia
- Reign: 957 – 967
- Predecessor: George II
- Successor: Demetrius III
- Dynasty: Anchabadze
- Religion: Georgian Orthodox Church

Leon III (Georgian: ლეონ III) was King of Abkhazia from 957 until 967. He was the second son and successor of George II of the Anchabadze dynasty.

== Life ==
He succeeded in 926 as viceroy of Kartli to his older brother Constantine, the latter was blinded and castrated by George II after Constantine's unsuccessful rebellion. George proceeded to campaign against the easternmost Georgian Principality of Kakheti whose ruler Kvirike II also pretended on parts of Kartli. George and Leon were supported by his brother-in-law prince Shurta, who was also natural brother of Kvirike, who ceded Ujarma fortress to Abkhazians. Kvirike was defeated and imprisoned, and released only after he had submitted to vassalage.

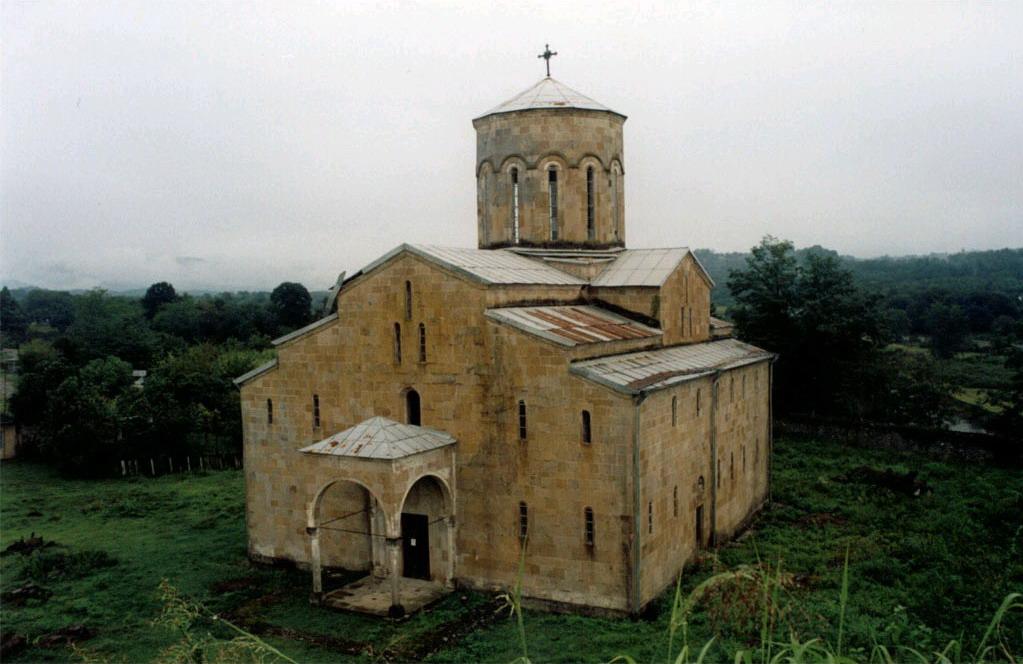
Mokvi Cathedral constructed in 10th century, during the reign of King Leon III of Abkhazia

Soon, Kvirike returned to the offensive and incited the rebellion in Kartli. In 957, George sent a large army under his son, Leon, but the king died amid the expedition, and Leon had to make peace with Kvirike ending his campaign inconclusively. Kvirike was forced to agree to the marriage of his son David, with the daughter of Leon. Unfortunately, the peace did not last long, as the princess died soon and mistrust returned between the two parties. Leon attacked Kakheti again and sacked Mukhnari, Kherki and Bazaleti; In this last place he became ill and died in 967. He was succeeded by his brother Demetrius III of Abkhazia.

In 964 Leon III extended his influence to Javakheti, during his reign was built Kumurdo Cathedral.

== Family ==
Leon married an unknown princess:

=== Issue ===
- Anonymous daughter, who marries David of Kakheti.

== Genealogy ==
Genealogy of the Kings of Abkhazia

Theodor; Archon of Abasgia r. 710's–730
Constantine II; Archon of Abasgia r. 730–745	Leon I Archon of Abasgia r. 745–767
Leon II; Archon of Abasgia r. 767–780; King of Abkhazia r. 780–828
Theodosius II; King of Abkhazia r. 828–855	Demetrius II; King of Abkhazia r. 855–864	George I King of Abkhazia r. 864–871
Tinen of Chikha	Bagrat I King of Abkhazia r. 882–894
Constantine III; King of Abkhazia r. 894–923
Anonymous daughter married to Ashot of Klarjeti	George II; King of Abkhazia r. 923–957	fr:Bagrat Anchabadzé; King of Abkhazia r. 923–930
Constantine; Duke of Kartli r. 923–926	Leon III; Duke of Kartli r. 926–957; King of Abkhazia r. 960–969	Demetrius III; King of Abkhazia r. 969–976	Theodosius III; King of Abkhazia r. 976–978	Bagrat	Anonymous daughter married to Shourta of Kakheti	Gurandukht married to Gurgen of Iberia	Anonymous daughter married to Abas I of Armenia
Bagrat II; King of Abkhazia r. 978–1014

== Bibliography ==
- Marie-Félicité Brosset, Histoire de la Géorgie depuis l'Antiquité jusqu'au XIX^{e} siècle, v. 1–7, Saint-Pétersbourg, 1848–58, p. 285-286.

Preceded by George II	King of Abkhazia; 960–969	Succeeded by Demetrius III
