= Theodosius III of Abkhazia =

10th-century Georgian king

Theodosius III თეოდოს III

King of Abkhazia
- Reign: 975 – 978
- Predecessor: Demetrius III
- Successor: Bagrat III
- Dynasty: Anchabadze
- Religion: Georgian Orthodox Church

Theodosius III the Blind (Georgian: თეოდოს III; also known as Theodosius the Sorrowed) was King of the Abkhazians from circa 975 to 978. (Note: According to René Grousset from 979 to 985.) He was the fourth son of George II of the Anchabadze dynasty. He succeeded his brother Demetrius III, who died without a male heir.

== Life ==
King George II of Abkhazia sent two of his younger sons, Theodosius and Bagrat, to Constantinople to be educated there, so that after his death there would be no dispute during his succession. After his reigning brother Leon III died in 967, a rebel party of Meskhetian, Egrisian and Kartlian nobles encouraged Theodosius to assert his rights against his brother, Demetrius III. Victorious in the ensuing civil war, Demetrius had Theodosius captured and blinded.

Theodosius first took refuge in the Kartli with certain Adarnase, then with David III of Tao where he remained for a while, and finally moved at the court of Kvirke II of Kakheti. Demetrius III managed to convince Theodosius to organize a reconciliation, who agreed to return to Abkhazia with guarantees of personal security confirmed by oaths before the Catholicos and the clergy. The central government was still powerful enough to cope with the local separatism, but not for surmounting the growing structural crisis. The weakness of the government brought about another act of cruelty. Demetrius caught his brother Theodosius in plotting again blinded him.

It was not until the death of childless Demetrius in 975, when Theodosius was able to ascend the throne. During the short reign of King Theodosius III, the kingdom became engulfed into complete chaos and feudal anarchy combined with the raids by the Kakhetians in Kartli, where the royal power had completely collapsed and a governor, Ioanne Marushis-dze, allied with the Georgian Bagratid prince David III Kuropalates of Tao to install Theodosius's nephew (sister's son) Bagrat as a ruler of Kartli in 975. In 978, through Marushidze's efforts, Gurandukht's weak reigning brother Theodosius III was deposed and Bagrat, now of age, proclaimed King of Abkhazia. Since then Theodosius disappeared from history.

== Genealogy ==
Genealogy of the Kings of Abkhazia

Theodor; Archon of Abasgia r. 710's–730
Constantine II; Archon of Abasgia r. 730–745	Leon I Archon of Abasgia r. 745–767
Leon II; Archon of Abasgia r. 767–780; King of Abkhazia r. 780–828
Theodosius II; King of Abkhazia r. 828–855	Demetrius II; King of Abkhazia r. 855–864	George I King of Abkhazia r. 864–871
Tinen of Chikha	Bagrat I King of Abkhazia r. 882–894
Constantine III; King of Abkhazia r. 894–923
Anonymous daughter married to Ashot of Klarjeti	George II; King of Abkhazia r. 923–957	fr:Bagrat Anchabadzé; King of Abkhazia r. 923–930
Constantine; Duke of Kartli r. 923–926	Leon III; Duke of Kartli r. 926–957; King of Abkhazia r. 960–969	Demetrius III; King of Abkhazia r. 969–976	Theodosius III; King of Abkhazia r. 976–978	Bagrat	Anonymous daughter married to Shourta of Kakheti	Gurandukht married to Gurgen of Iberia	Anonymous daughter married to Abas I of Armenia
Bagrat II; King of Abkhazia r. 978–1014

== See also ==
- Divan of the Abkhazian Kings

== Bibliography ==
- Marie-Félicité Brosset, Histoire de la Géorgie, p. 290-295.
- Marie-Félicité Brosset, Additions et éclaircissements à l'Histoire de la Géorgie, Addition IX, p. 174-175.

Preceded by Demetrius III	King of Abkhazia; 975–978	Succeeded by Bagrat II
