= Gurandukht of Abkhazia =

Queen and regent of Kartli

Gurandukht
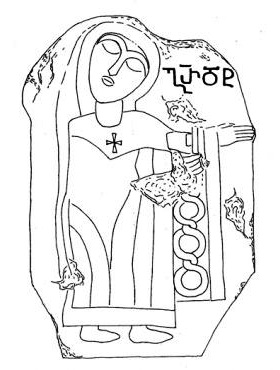
- Queen Gurandukht, a sketch of carved relief from Kumurdo Cathedral.

Queen consort of the Iberians
- Tenure: 994 – c. 999

Queen mother of Abkhazia
- Tenure: 978 – c. 999

Eristavi of the Saeristavo of Kartli
- Reign: 978 – 980
- Predecessor: Bagrat and Gurgen
- Spouse: Gurgen of Georgia
- Issue: Bagrat III of Georgia
- Dynasty: Anchabadze
- Father: George II of Abkhazia

Gurandukht or Guarandukht (Georgian: გურანდუხტი, გუარანდუხტი, fl. 960–999) was a queen of Kartli by marriage to Gurgen of Kartli, and regent during the minority of her son from 975. She was a daughter of King George II of Abkhazia and wife of the Bagratid royal Gurgen of Kartli.

She was the last known member of the royal house of Abkhazia, a fact that provided an opportunity to her son, Bagrat, to claim the crown of Abkhazia. By virtue of being also heir to the Georgian Bagratid principalities, Bagrat went on to become the first king of unified Kingdom of Georgia. Gurandukht stood by her son in his political and cultural enterprises. Gurandukht is known from The Georgian Chronicles and several inscriptions.

== Biography ==
Gurandukht was a daughter of George II of Abkhazia (r. 916–960) and, thus, sister to the three succeeding monarchs—Leon III, Demetrius III, and Theodosius III. Gurandukht is depicted in relief on the northern squinch over eastern arch of the Kumurdo Cathedral in Javakheti, with an accompanying inscription in the medieval Georgian asomtavruli script ႢႰႣႲ, "G[u]R[an]D[ukh]T". The southern relief shows her brother Leon III, who is unnamed, but mentioned in a dedicatory inscription on the south door of the church, dated to 964.

Gurandukht was married to Gurgen, a member of the Georgian Bagratid family and a son of Bagrat II "the Simple", the titular king of Kartli, which was de facto under the Kingdom of Abkhazia. As none of Gurandukht's brothers produced a male heir, her son with Gurgen, Bagrat, was the potential heir to the crowns of both Abkhazia and Kartli. In addition, Bagrat was adopted by his powerful cousin, David III of Tao, through the advice of Iovane Marushisdze, eristavi of Kartli.

=== Regency ===
David installed the boy-prince Bagrat as a ruler in Kartli in 975, with Gurgen and Gurandukht as regents. The family had to deal with strong aristocratic opposition, but enjoyed the support and protection of David of Tao. In 978, again through Marushidze's efforts, Gurandukht's weak reigning brother Theodosius III was deposed and Bagrat, now of age, proclaimed King of Abkhazia. On this occasion, Bagrat and Gurandukht sponsored the construction of the Bedia Cathedral, completed in 999, and donated a gilded chalice to it. For a time, during Bagrat's absence in Abkhazia, Gurandukht administered the key fortified, rock-hewn town of Uplistsikhe and part of Kartli.

Gurandukht's husband Gurgen succeeded on his father's death as king of Kartli in 994. When he died in 1008, Bagrat, for the first time in history, united the western kingdom of Abkhazia with the eastern realm of Kartli to give rise to the unified Georgian monarchy.

The date of Gurandukht's death is not known, but she is mentioned as dead in two inscriptions of Bagrat III, an undated one from Akhalsopeli in Kvemo Kartli and the other, dated to 1002, from the Tsvimoeti church in Shida Kartli.

== Genealogy ==
Genealogy of the Kings of Abkhazia

Theodor; Archon of Abasgia r. 710's–730
Constantine II; Archon of Abasgia r. 730–745	Leon I Archon of Abasgia r. 745–767
Leon II; Archon of Abasgia r. 767–780; King of Abkhazia r. 780–828
Theodosius II; King of Abkhazia r. 828–855	Demetrius II; King of Abkhazia r. 855–864	George I King of Abkhazia r. 864–871
Tinen of Chikha	Bagrat I King of Abkhazia r. 882–894
Constantine III; King of Abkhazia r. 894–923
Anonymous daughter married to Ashot of Klarjeti	George II; King of Abkhazia r. 923–957	fr:Bagrat Anchabadzé; King of Abkhazia r. 923–930
Constantine; Duke of Kartli r. 923–926	Leon III; Duke of Kartli r. 926–957; King of Abkhazia r. 960–969	Demetrius III; King of Abkhazia r. 969–976	Theodosius III; King of Abkhazia r. 976–978	Bagrat	Anonymous daughter married to Shourta of Kakheti	Gurandukht married to Gurgen of Iberia	Anonymous daughter married to Abas I of Armenia
Bagrat II; King of Abkhazia r. 978–1014
