= George I of Abkhazia =

King of the Abkhazian from circa 864 to 871

George I გიორგი I

King of Abkhazia
- Reign: 864 – 871
- Predecessor: Demetrius II
- Successor: John
- Dynasty: Anchabadze
- Religion: Georgian Orthodox Church

George I (Georgian: გიორგი I, აღწეფელი) was King of the Abkhazian from circa 864 to 871. He was the third son of Leon II of the Anchabadze dynasty. He succeeded his brother Demetrius II. His nickname "Aghts’epeli" (Georgian: აღწეფელი) is linked to his former domain of Aghtseph.

== Life ==
The Divan of the Abkhazian Kings designates him as the brother of his predecessor but does not indicate the duration of his reign. According to the Georgian Chronicles he is indeed the brother of Theodosius and Demetrius, and son of Leon. George I took control of Kartli and granted it to Tinen, a son of his brother Demetrius II, whose second son Bagrat was reportedly exiled to Byzantine Empire for an unknown reason. On the death of Georges I, his wife, whose name is not specified, seduced by a nobleman, the John Shavliani, put on death Tinen and attempted to kill Bagrat to give the throne of Abkhazia to her lover.

== Genealogy ==
Genealogy of the Kings of Abkhazia

Theodor; Archon of Abasgia r. 710's–730
Constantine II; Archon of Abasgia r. 730–745	Leon I Archon of Abasgia r. 745–767
Leon II; Archon of Abasgia r. 767–780; King of Abkhazia r. 780–828
Theodosius II; King of Abkhazia r. 828–855	Demetrius II; King of Abkhazia r. 855–864	George I King of Abkhazia r. 864–871
Tinen of Chikha	Bagrat I King of Abkhazia r. 882–894
Constantine III; King of Abkhazia r. 894–923
Anonymous daughter married to Ashot of Klarjeti	George II; King of Abkhazia r. 923–957	fr:Bagrat Anchabadzé; King of Abkhazia r. 923–930
Constantine; Duke of Kartli r. 923–926	Leon III; Duke of Kartli r. 926–957; King of Abkhazia r. 960–969	Demetrius III; King of Abkhazia r. 969–976	Theodosius III; King of Abkhazia r. 976–978	Bagrat	Anonymous daughter married to Shourta of Kakheti	Gurandukht married to Gurgen of Iberia	Anonymous daughter married to Abas I of Armenia
Bagrat II; King of Abkhazia r. 978–1014

== Bibliography ==
- Marie-Félicité Brosset, Histoire de la Géorgie.

Preceded by Demetrius II	King of Abkhazia; 864–871	Succeeded by John
