= House of Shavliani =

Noble family in Abkhazia

House of Shavliani შავლიანი
- Reign: 871-893
- Dynasty: Shavliani
- Religion: Georgian Orthodox Church

The Shavliani dynasty (/ʃɑvliɑni/; Georgian: შავლიანი, romanized: shavliani [ˈshavliani]) was a group of Egrisian lords who became so powerful that they even faced off against the Abkhazian royal dynasty. They usurped power after George I died, installing John Shavliani as king until his death, when his heir Adarnase succeeded him. During Adarnase's reign, Megrelian nobles and Byzantines who remained faithful to Bagrat I wished to overthrow Adarnase in his conflicts against the Armenians. But after Adarnase lost the Battle of Kutais, the dynasty withdrew to Racha-Lechkhumi and Kvemo Svaneti, where they took on new surnames to avoid being persecuted. Adarnase died as a result. Inscriptions found in local churches attest to the affection the people of Khoni had for the rulers, who owned estates in the Khoni Municipality's Nakhakhulevi and Kukhi.

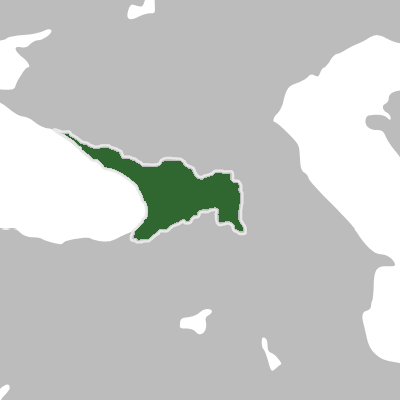
The Shavliani Dynasty at its peak, 881 AD. The capital was located in Kutaisi or at that time, Kutais.

== Background ==
The Shavliani Dynasty was a feudal family in Abkhazia, of Egrisian origin specifically Svan. Prior to claiming the throne of Abkhazia, the clan was one of the most primary feudals in Abkhazia, even competing with the royal dynasty. Only two Shavlianis are known to ever claim the throne of Abkhazia (871-893) who were regarded as "usurpers", that being, John of Abkhazia and Adarnase of Abkhazia, son of John.

== Rise to power ==
Following the death of George I of Abkhazia, the Shavliani family took advantage of the widowed queen and expelled the heir of George's throne, Bagrat I of Abkhazia via drowning attempt. John Shavliani seized the throne for two years until his death, hence his heir Adarnase of Abkhazia would acquire the throne.

== During rule ==
Adarnase assisted the Chief of Javakheti, Nasra Gvaramisdze in the conflict against Armenians, who were persecuting Nasra for the murder of Davit Bagrationi. With the support of Megrelian Nobles and Byzantines controlled by Bagrat I of Abkhazia. The final confrontation occurred in Battle of Kutais, where Bagrat would direct his army to occupy Kutais. Adarnase's forces would lose, with Adarnase dying in battle as well.

== After the loss ==
As a result, the fragmentation of the Shavliani family surname into regional variations — Shavlidze (შავლიძე), Shavladze (შავლაძე), and Shavlaqhadze (შავლაყაძე) — reportedly occurred as a means of concealing their identity during periods of persecution, identifying the Shavlidze family of Batumi, Adjara's Khelvachauri (Shavlidzeebi village) and Keda (Saghorethi/Pirveli Maisi village) municipalities as direct descendants, along with the Shavladze and Shavlaqhadze branches, located in Racha-Lechkhumi and Imereti respectively, representing various lines of the original family. This name change aimed to protect their lineage and avoid recognition as members of the Shavliani dynasty.

== Present population ==
According to data from the Statistics and Data Analysis Agency of Georgia as of July 19, 2025, the population of Shavliani family descendants residing in Georgia is distributed among three main surname variants:

- Shavlidze (შავლიძე): 359 people;
- Shavladze (შავლაძე): 277 people;
- Shavlaqhadze (შავლაყაძე): 254 people.

== Additional information ==
The people of Khoni had a fondness for the two rulers, which is confirmed by the inscriptions of the church in the area, with statements written such as "St. George, have mercy on Iovane" or "St. George have mercy on Erismtavari Adarnase." The rulers held estates in Nakhakhulevi and Kukhi, which are both villages located in the Khoni Municipality.

== See also ==
- The Georgian Chronicles
