= Leon II of Abkhazia =

King of Abkhazia (r. 767–828)

Leon II
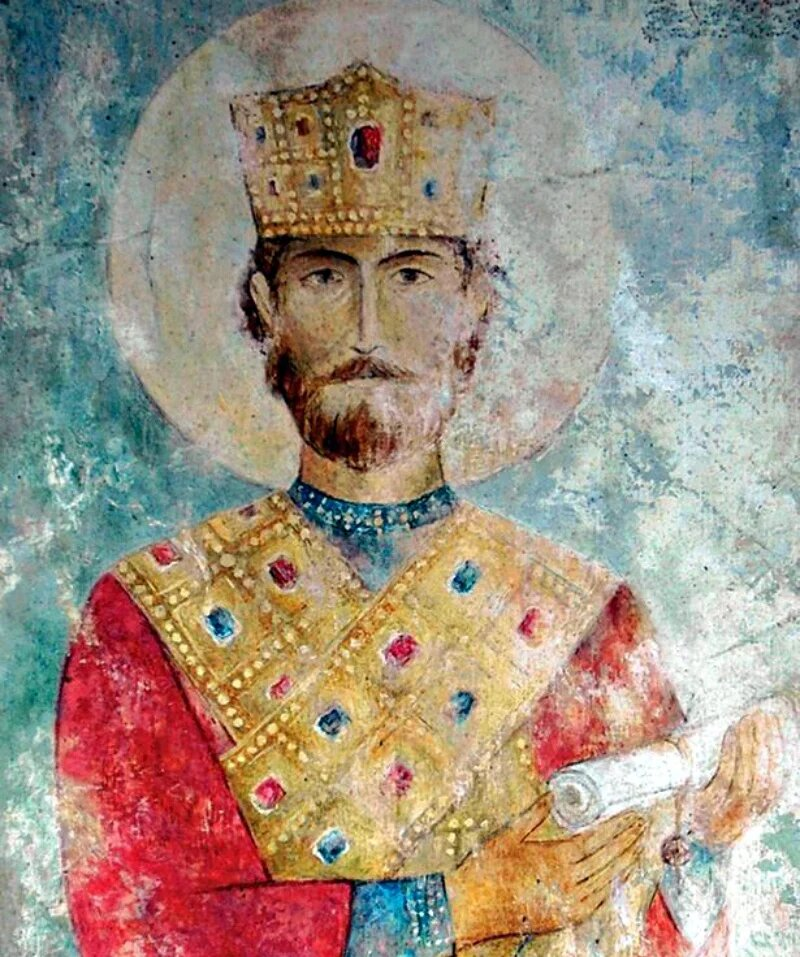

King of Abkhazia
- Reign: 778–828
- Successor: Theodosius II

Archon of Abasgia
- Reign: 767–778
- Predecessor: Leon I
- Issue: Theodosius II of Abkhazia; Demetrius II of Abkhazia; George I of Abkhazia
- House: Anchabadze
- Religion: Georgian Orthodox Church

Leon II (Georgian: ლეონ II), of the Anchabadze dynasty, was the hereditary prince (Eristavi) from 767 to 778 and king (mepe) of the Kingdom of Abkhazia from 778 to 828. He was the nephew and successor of Leon I and from maternal side grandson of the reigning Khagan of the Khazars (possibly Bihar or Baghatur).

== Life ==
Leon II exploited an existing dynastic union to acquire Lazica in the 770s, as John was dead and Juansher grew old. Towards circa 778, Leon II won his full independence with the help of the Khazars to assumed the title of "King of the Abkhazians" and transferred his capital from Anacopia to the western Georgian city of Kutaisi. According to Georgian annals, Leon subdivided his kingdom into eight duchies: Abkhazia proper, Tskhumi, Bedia, Guria, Racha and Takveri, Svaneti, Argveti, and Kutatisi. Leon II during his life strengthened the contacts with the political circles of Tao-Klarjeti by means of the dynasty marriages.

During his reign Abkhazian kingdom was the stage of the state building and was less active in the matter of spreading the borders of the kingdom to the East. After obtaining of the state independence, the matter of the church independence became the main problem. Leon II was not able to conduct the independent church policy till it was dependent on Constantinople. Besides, the empire tried, with the help of the church to influence the inner and foreign policy of the kingdom. Church split of Abkhazia from Constantinople in Prince Vakhushti of Kartli's opinion had place during Leon II reign.

== Family ==
The children of Leon were:

- Theodosius II of Abkhazia, king of Abkhazia (r. 828–855);
- Demetrius II of Abkhazia, king of Abkhazia (r. 855–864);
- George I of Abkhazia, king of Abkhazia (r. 864–871.

== Genealogy ==
Genealogy of the Kings of Abkhazia

Theodor; Archon of Abasgia r. 710's–730
Constantine II; Archon of Abasgia r. 730–745	Leon I Archon of Abasgia r. 745–767
Leon II; Archon of Abasgia r. 767–780; King of Abkhazia r. 780–828
Theodosius II; King of Abkhazia r. 828–855	Demetrius II; King of Abkhazia r. 855–864	George I King of Abkhazia r. 864–871
Tinen of Chikha	Bagrat I King of Abkhazia r. 882–894
Constantine III; King of Abkhazia r. 894–923
Anonymous daughter married to Ashot of Klarjeti	George II; King of Abkhazia r. 923–957	fr:Bagrat Anchabadzé; King of Abkhazia r. 923–930
Constantine; Duke of Kartli r. 923–926	Leon III; Duke of Kartli r. 926–957; King of Abkhazia r. 960–969	Demetrius III; King of Abkhazia r. 969–976	Theodosius III; King of Abkhazia r. 976–978	Bagrat	Anonymous daughter married to Shourta of Kakheti	Gurandukht married to Gurgen of Iberia	Anonymous daughter married to Abas I of Armenia
Bagrat II; King of Abkhazia r. 978–1014

== See also ==
- Divan of the Abkhazian Kings

== Sources ==
- Kevin Alan Brook. The Jews of Khazaria. 3rd ed. Rowman & Littlefield Publishers, Inc, 2018.
- Peter B. Golden. Khazar Studies: An Historio-Philological Inquiry into the Origins of the Khazars. Budapest: Akadémiai Kiadó, 1980.

Preceded by Leon I	King of Abkhazia; 767/68–811/12	Succeeded by Theodosius II
