= George II of Abkhazia =

10th-century Georgian king

George II გიორგი II
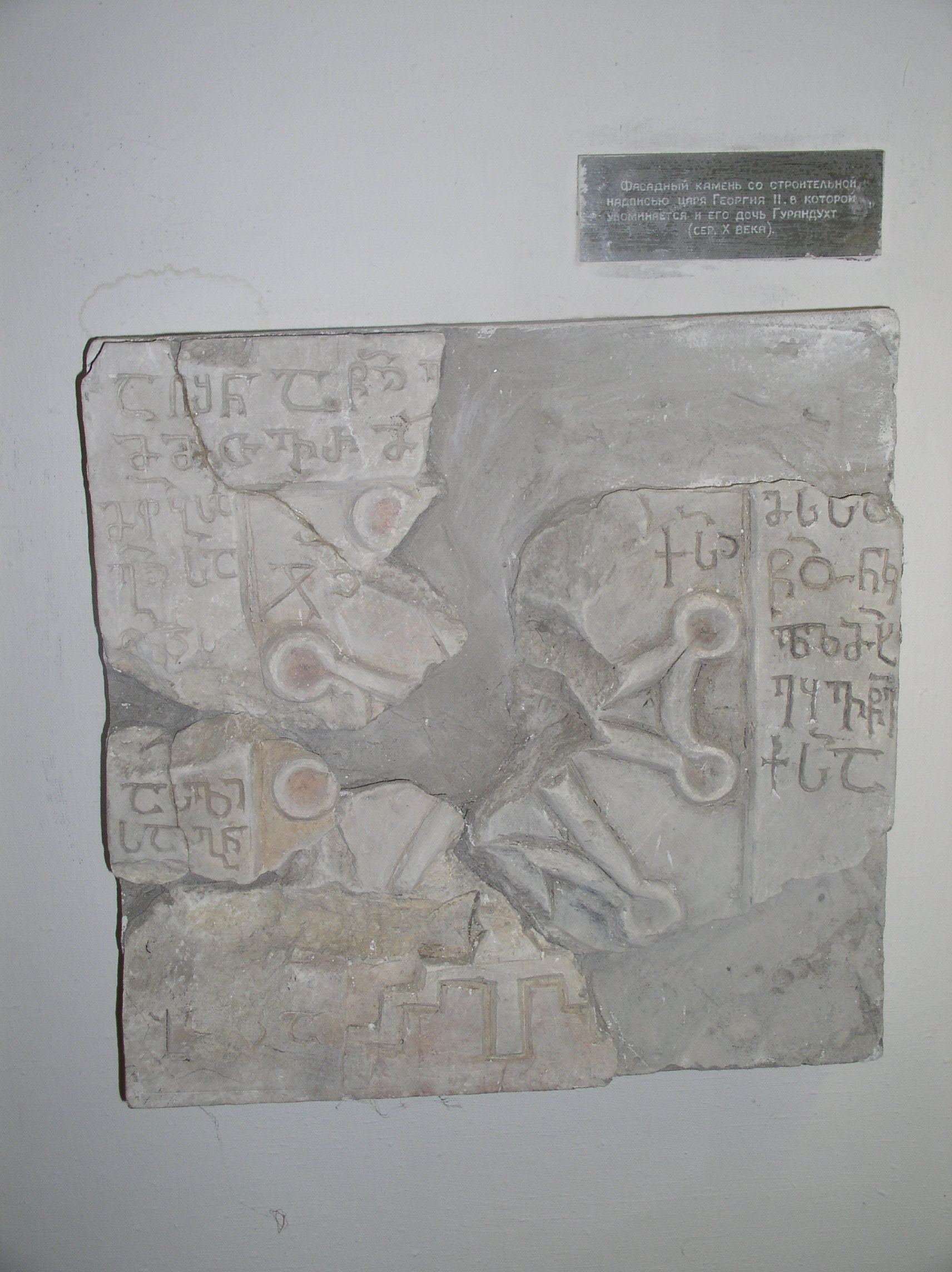
- Façade stone of the Khuap church with the Georgian asomtavruli inscription probably commemorating George II

King of Abkhazia
- Reign: 923–957
- Predecessor: Constantine III
- Successor: Leon III
- Spouse: Helen
- Issue Among others: Leon III; Demetrius III; Theodosius III; Gurandukht
- House: Anchabadze
- Father: Constantine III of Abkhazia
- Religion: Georgian Orthodox Church

George II (Georgian: გიორგი II, romanized: giorgi II), of the Leonid dynasty was a king of Abkhazia from 923 to 957 AD. (Note: According to Cyril Toumanoff 915/916 to 959/960, while according to René Grousset, who cites Marie-Félicité Brosset, from 921 to 955.) His lengthy reign is regarded as a zenith of cultural flowering and political power of his realm. Despite being independent and locally titled as a mepe (king), he is also regarded as Exousiastes, (Note: The term was in currency in the 10th and 11th centuries because, at that time, the term basileus ("king") was reserved for the Byzantine monarch only.) the title that was conferred upon him by the Byzantines.

George II continued the expansionist policy of his predecessor, primarily aiming at the unification of Georgia. It took him, however, some time to assume full ruling powers as his half-brother Bagrat also claimed the crown.

== Life ==
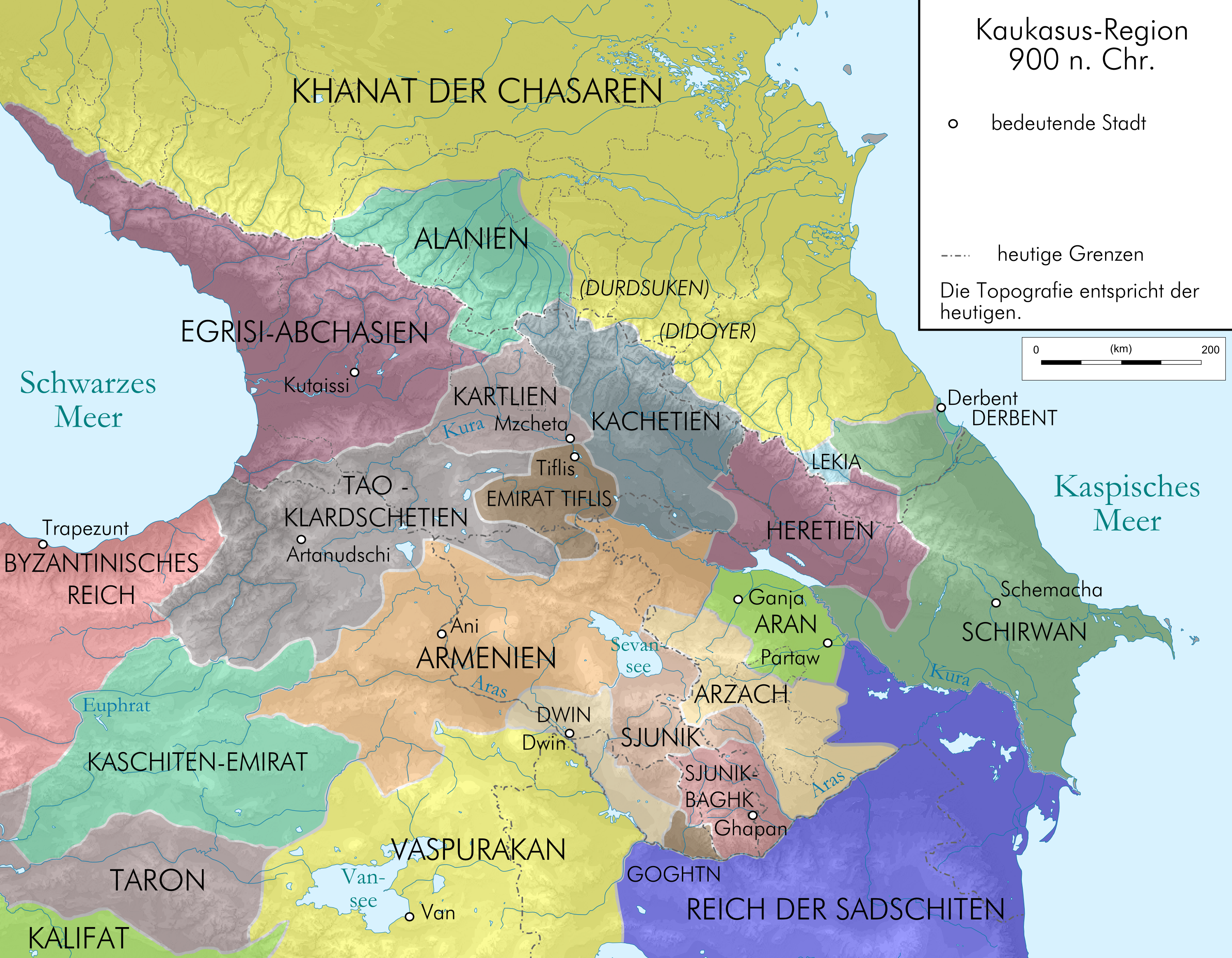
Boundaries of Kingdom of Abkhazia, before George's accession to the throne.

In 923, King Constantine III of Abkhazia (r. 894–923) died, and George, then George II Abkhazia succeeded him. However, Bagrat, George's youngest brother, also claimed the crown, the latter engineered a coup with the support of a party of nobles, most importantly his father-in-law, Gurgen II of Tao (r. 918–941). The conflict lasted for nearly seven years and ended with the sudden death of Bagrat in 930. To secure the allegiance of the local nobility in central Georgia, George appointed his son Constantine as a duke/viceroy of Kartli in 923, but the latter too, revolted against him in 926. In response, George entered in Kartli and placed the rock-hewn city of Uplistsikhe under siege. He lured Constantine by treachery and had him blinded and castrated. In the same year, he installed another son, Leon (the future king Leon III), as a duke/viceroy of Kartli.

George II, aided by the rebellious Kakhetian (Gardabanian clan) nobles, proceeded to campaign against the Kvirike II, Prince-bishop of Kakheti. He succeeded in dispossessing Kvirike of his principality in the 930s. To secure his supremacy over Kartli, George allied himself with the Georgian Bagratids of Tao-Klarjeti, and betrothed his daughter, Gurandukht, to Gurgen Bagrationi. Kvirike was soon back on the offensive and stirred up a rebellion in Kartli. In response, George sent a large army under his son, Leon, but the king died during the expedition, and Leon had to make peace with Kvirike, ending his campaign inconclusively.

== Cultural life ==
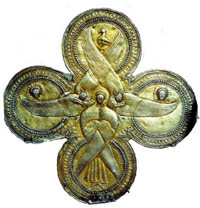
A ripidion (liturgical fan) with a Georgian inscription, donated by George II to the Kiachi church.

George was also known as a promoter of Orthodox Christianity and a patron of Georgian Christian culture. He helped to establish Christianity as an official religion in Alania, achieving this feat thanks to Constantinople. In the first half of the 10th century, he founded the Khopa (Gudauta district) and Kiachi (Ochamchire district) cathedrals, as well as the Ckhondidi cathedral (Martvili district) to counter the Greek cathedrals, and, by virtue of this, new cathedrals were a mainstay of the central state-power against external and internal enemies.

== Character ==
The Georgian Chronicles describes him:

“He had all the virtues, courage and boldness; was faithful to God, was famous as the builder of the churches, merciful towards the poor, generous, modest, full of noble features and kind”.

Quote from Byzantine patriarch Nicholas Mystikos's letter addressed to King George, written immediately after his accession on the throne.

“...You (George), an intelligent, sensible man...”

18th century Georgian historian Vakhushti Bagrationi describes him:

“George was the God-Fearing and pious king, stately, bold and courageous, merciful, generous, church builder, kind to orphans and widows”.

== Family ==
George was married to certain Helen, their children were:

- Constantine, duke/viceroy of Kartli (923–926);
- Leon III of Abkhazia, duke/viceroy of Kartli (926–957); king of Abkhazia (960–969).
- Demetrius III of Abkhazia, king of Abkhazia (969–976).
- Theodosius III of Abkhazia, sent to Constantinople to be educated there; king of Abkhazia (975–978).
- Bagrat, sent to Constantinople to be educated there.
- Anonymous daughter, married to Prince Shurta of Kakheti (Kvirike II's brother).
- Gurandukht, who married Gurgen of Iberia.
- Anonymous daughter, married to Abas I of Armenia.

== Genealogy ==
Genealogy of the Kings of Abkhazia

Theodor; Archon of Abasgia r. 710's–730
Constantine II; Archon of Abasgia r. 730–745	Leon I Archon of Abasgia r. 745–767
Leon II; Archon of Abasgia r. 767–780; King of Abkhazia r. 780–828
Theodosius II; King of Abkhazia r. 828–855	Demetrius II; King of Abkhazia r. 855–864	George I King of Abkhazia r. 864–871
Tinen of Chikha	Bagrat I King of Abkhazia r. 882–894
Constantine III; King of Abkhazia r. 894–923
Anonymous daughter married to Ashot of Klarjeti	George II; King of Abkhazia r. 923–957	fr:Bagrat Anchabadzé; King of Abkhazia r. 923–930
Constantine; Duke of Kartli r. 923–926	Leon III; Duke of Kartli r. 926–957; King of Abkhazia r. 960–969	Demetrius III; King of Abkhazia r. 969–976	Theodosius III; King of Abkhazia r. 976–978	Bagrat	Anonymous daughter married to Shourta of Kakheti	Gurandukht married to Gurgen of Iberia	Anonymous daughter married to Abas I of Armenia
Bagrat II; King of Abkhazia r. 978–1014

== See also ==
- Divan of the Abkhazian Kings
- History of Georgia

== Sources ==
- Marie-Félicité Brosset, Histoire de la Géorgie, et Additions IX, p. 175.
- Анчабадзе З. В., Из истории средневековой Абхазии (VI-XVII вв.), Сух., 1959;

Preceded by Constantine III	King of Abkhazia; 923–957	Succeeded by Leon III
