= Bagrat I of Abkhazia =

9th-century Georgian king

Bagrat I ბაგრატ I

King of Abkhazia
- Reign: 882 - 894
- Predecessor: Adarnase
- Successor: Constantine III
- Dynasty: Anchabadze
- Religion: Georgian Orthodox Church

Bagrat I (Georgian: ბაგრატ I) was the King of Abkhazia between 882 and 894. (Note: According to Cyril Toumanoff (1990, p. 535) 887 to 899.) He was the second son of Demetrius II of the Anchabadze dynasty.

== Life ==
After the usurper John Shavliani seized the throne Bagrat fled to Constantinople and lived there for some time until he returned to Abkhazia in 887. He deposed and put to death Adarnase Shavliani (the son of John Shavliani), reclaimed the throne and married the latter's widow (daughter of Guaram of Samtskhe), with whom he had a son Constantine who succeeded him to the throne of Abkhazia.

=== Intervention in Tao-Klarjeti ===
Bagrat supported his brother-in-law, Nasra who tried to take power in Tao-Klarjeti, the latter killed David I curopalates in 881 and placed on the throne Gurgen I of Tao. After the murder, Nasra was forced to flee to the Byzantine Empire, where he was retrieved by Bagrat I. Bagrat managed to secure the Byzantine military aid for him and invaded the Bagratid possessions on Nasra's behalf in 887. The only son of David I, Adarnase then allied to Ashot I of Armenia and resisted invaders. Thus, a Bagratid dynastic feud evolved into a regional conflict. Eventually, Gurgen I of Tao switched his side and joined Adarnase against Nasra who was defeated and put to death in 888.

== Family ==
Bagrat I married a daughter of Guaram of Samtskhe:

=== Issue ===
- Constantine III, King of the Abkhazia from 893 until 922 AD.

== Genealogy ==
Genealogy of the Kings of Abkhazia

Theodor; Archon of Abasgia r. 710's–730
Constantine II; Archon of Abasgia r. 730–745	Leon I Archon of Abasgia r. 745–767
Leon II; Archon of Abasgia r. 767–780; King of Abkhazia r. 780–828
Theodosius II; King of Abkhazia r. 828–855	Demetrius II; King of Abkhazia r. 855–864	George I King of Abkhazia r. 864–871
Tinen of Chikha	Bagrat I King of Abkhazia r. 882–894
Constantine III; King of Abkhazia r. 894–923
Anonymous daughter married to Ashot of Klarjeti	George II; King of Abkhazia r. 923–957	fr:Bagrat Anchabadzé; King of Abkhazia r. 923–930
Constantine; Duke of Kartli r. 923–926	Leon III; Duke of Kartli r. 926–957; King of Abkhazia r. 960–969	Demetrius III; King of Abkhazia r. 969–976	Theodosius III; King of Abkhazia r. 976–978	Bagrat	Anonymous daughter married to Shourta of Kakheti	Gurandukht married to Gurgen of Iberia	Anonymous daughter married to Abas I of Armenia
Bagrat II; King of Abkhazia r. 978–1014

== Sources ==
- Marie-Félicité Brosset, Histoire de la Géorgie..
- АБХАЗИЯ - взгляд сквозь века
- A. Bogveradze, Georgian Soviet Encyclopedia, II, p. 127-128, Tbilisi, 1977

Preceded by Adarnase Shavliani	King of Abkhazia; 882–894	Succeeded by Constantine III
