= Leon I of Abasgia =

Leon I was the hereditary prince (Eristavi) of Abasgia, ruling sometime between 720 - 740, or from c. 745 - 767, and a vassal to the Byzantine Emperor. The Divan of the Abkhazian Kings mentions that his reign took place in the 1st half of the 8th century. During his reign Leon actively battled invading Arabs and had close diplomatic contacts with the prince of Iberia and Kakheti, Archil. He also had significant relations to the Byzantine emperor Leo III the Isaurian, to whom he sent a letter asking for help against the forces of the Umayyad Caliphate. In answer, the Emperor confirmed his hereditary rule over Abasgia and suggested that he should accept Archil as his overlord and suzerain and by doing so, battle the Muslims with united forces. Leo III also bestowed the title of Archon upon the Abasgian King. This meant that the Byzantines accepted Leon I's rule over the lands of Egrisi, Jiketi and Sanigia. The ties between Archil and Leon I were also strengthened by Leon's marriage with Gurandukht, the daughter of Archil's brother Mirian of Kakheti.

In 735, a large expedition led by Arab general Marwan was launched against the Georgian kingdoms. Abasgia suffered greatly from the invasion. After the pivotal siege of Anakopia, the Arabs were decisively defeated and retreated with heavy losses. During the invasion, Archil took shelter in Abasgia. Assisted by Leon, they participated in many important battles against the Arabs, including the siege of Anakopia. The reign of Leon I was a very important episode in the history of Georgia. Despite heavy losses, the Georgians managed to dissipate the invading Arab forces, which undoubtedly determined the survival of Christianity and statehood in Western Georgia, with long lasting future consequences.

== Genealogy ==
Genealogy of the Kings of Abkhazia

Theodor; Archon of Abasgia r. 710's–730
Constantine II; Archon of Abasgia r. 730–745	Leon I Archon of Abasgia r. 745–767
Leon II; Archon of Abasgia r. 767–780; King of Abkhazia r. 780–828
Theodosius II; King of Abkhazia r. 828–855	Demetrius II; King of Abkhazia r. 855–864	George I King of Abkhazia r. 864–871
Tinen of Chikha	Bagrat I King of Abkhazia r. 882–894
Constantine III; King of Abkhazia r. 894–923
Anonymous daughter married to Ashot of Klarjeti	George II; King of Abkhazia r. 923–957	fr:Bagrat Anchabadzé; King of Abkhazia r. 923–930
Constantine; Duke of Kartli r. 923–926	Leon III; Duke of Kartli r. 926–957; King of Abkhazia r. 960–969	Demetrius III; King of Abkhazia r. 969–976	Theodosius III; King of Abkhazia r. 976–978	Bagrat	Anonymous daughter married to Shourta of Kakheti	Gurandukht married to Gurgen of Iberia	Anonymous daughter married to Abas I of Armenia
Bagrat II; King of Abkhazia r. 978–1014

== See also ==
- Divan of the Abkhazian Kings

Preceded by Konstanti II	King of Abkhazia; 720–740	Succeeded by Leon II
