= John of Abkhazia =

9th-century Georgian king

John ივანე (იოვანე)
- 'Usurper'

King of Abkhazia
- Reign: 871–873
- Predecessor: George I
- Successor: Adarnase
- Dynasty: Shavliani
- Religion: Georgian Orthodox Church

John Shavliani (Georgian: ივანე (იოვანე) შავლიანი), was the noble and founder of House of Shavliani, presumably of Svan origin and King of Abkhazia between 871 and 873. (Note: According to Cyril Toumanoff (1990, p. 535) 877/878 to 879.)

== Life ==
King George I of Abkhazia died without a male heir, however there were still other members of the royal family that the two sons of his brother, Demetrius II: The oldest, Tinen of Tchikha and the youngest, Bagrat (then Bagrat I of Abkhazia) that was exiled to Constantinople. The representatives of the Shavliani aristocratic family, who had a deal with the Queen, the widow of George I, put to death Tinen, while Bagrat was "thrown into the sea", the latter survived and fled to Constantinople. As a result, John usurped the power in the kingdom but died after less than two years of reign and his son Adarnase succeeded him.

== Bibliography ==
- Marie-Félicité Brosset, Histoire de la Géorgie.
- Nodar Assatiani i Alexandre Bendianachvili, Histoire de la Géorgie, Paris, l'Harmattan, 1997, 335 pàgs. (ISBN 2-7384-6186-7).

Preceded by George I	King of Abkhazia; 871–873	Succeeded by Adarnase
