= Demetrius III of Abkhazia =

10th-century Georgian king

Demetrius III დემეტრე III

King of Abkhazia
- Reign: 967 – 975
- Predecessor: Leon III
- Successor: Theodosius III
- Dynasty: Anchabadze
- Religion: Georgian Orthodox Church

Demetrius III (Georgian: დემეტრე III) was King of the Abkhazia from 967 AD until 975 AD. He was the third son of George II of the Anchabadze dynasty. He succeeded his brother Leon III, who died without a male heir.

== Life ==
Demetrius III succeeded his brother Leon III, who died without a male heir in 967. The loyalty of nobles to the Abkhazian crown was far from stable. A party of nobles gathered and appealed to his younger brother Theodosius, who lived in exile in Byzantium, to assert his rights to the throne. The pretender and his followers were quickly defeated by Demetrius III. Teodosius first took refuge in the Kartli with certain Adarnase, then with David III of Tao where he remained for a while, and finally moved at the court of Kvirke II of Kakheti. Demetrius III managed to convince Theodosius to organize a reconciliation, who agreed to return to Abkhazia with guarantees of personal security confirmed by oaths before the Catholicos and the clergy. The central government was still powerful enough to cope with the local separatism, but not for surmounting the growing structural crisis. The weakness of the government brought about another act of cruelty. Demetrius caught his brother Theodosius in plotting again and then blinded him. This act raises the indignation of his subjects.

Nevertheless, Demetrius too dies childless, and Theodosius Ill the Blind (c. 975-978) becomes the sole heir to the throne of Abkhazia.

== Genealogy ==
Genealogy of the Kings of Abkhazia

Theodor; Archon of Abasgia r. 710's–730
Constantine II; Archon of Abasgia r. 730–745 | Leon I Archon of Abasgia r. 745–767
Leon II; Archon of Abasgia r. 767–780; King of Abkhazia r. 780–828
Theodosius II; King of Abkhazia r. 828–855 | Demetrius II; King of Abkhazia r. 855–864 | George I King of Abkhazia r. 864–871
Tinen of Chikha | Bagrat I King of Abkhazia r. 882–894
Constantine III; King of Abkhazia r. 894–923
Anonymous daughter married to Ashot of Klarjeti | George II; King of Abkhazia r. 923–957 | fr:Bagrat Anchabadzé; King of Abkhazia r. 923–930
Constantine; Duke of Kartli r. 923–926 | Leon III; Duke of Kartli r. 926–957; King of Abkhazia r. 960–969 | Demetrius III; King of Abkhazia r. 969–976 | Theodosius III; King of Abkhazia r. 976–978 | Bagrat | Anonymous daughter married to Shourta of Kakheti | Gurandukht married to Gurgen of Iberia | Anonymous daughter married to Abas I of Armenia
Bagrat II; King of Abkhazia r. 978–1014

== Sources ==
- Z. Anchabadze, Georgian Soviet Encyclopedia, III, p. 459, Tbilisi, 1978

| Preceded by Leon III | King of Abkhazia; 969–976 | Succeeded by Theodosius III |
