= Demetrius II of Abkhazia =

9th-century Georgian king

Demetrius II დემეტრე II

King of Abkhazia
- Reign: 855–864
- Predecessor: Theodosius II
- Successor: George I
- Issue: Prince Tinen; Bagrat I of Abkhazia
- Dynasty: Anchabadze
- Father: Leon II of Abkhazia
- Religion: Georgian Orthodox Church

Demetrius II (Georgian: დემეტრე II, romanized: demet're II) was King of the Abkhazia from circa 855 to 864. He was the second son of Leon II of the Anchabadze dynasty. He succeeded his brother Theodosius II.

== Biography ==
Demetrius supported Armenian rebels against the Abbasid Caliphate. His army was defeated by general Bugha and Demetrius fled northward toward Alania. Bugha pursued him with a 120,000-man army, but his advance was halted by fierce resistance from the mountain fighters of Kakheti (the Tsanars) amid severe winter conditions with heavy snowfall.

== Family ==
The children of Demetrius were:

- Tinen, duke of Chikha (died, 871 / 877);
- Bagrat I Abkhazia, King of the Abkhazia from 882 until 894 AD.

== Genealogy ==
Genealogy of the Kings of Abkhazia

Theodor; Archon of Abasgia r. 710's–730
Constantine II; Archon of Abasgia r. 730–745	Leon I Archon of Abasgia r. 745–767
Leon II; Archon of Abasgia r. 767–780; King of Abkhazia r. 780–828
Theodosius II; King of Abkhazia r. 828–855	Demetrius II; King of Abkhazia r. 855–864	George I King of Abkhazia r. 864–871
Tinen of Chikha	Bagrat I King of Abkhazia r. 882–894
Constantine III; King of Abkhazia r. 894–923
Anonymous daughter married to Ashot of Klarjeti	George II; King of Abkhazia r. 923–957	fr:Bagrat Anchabadzé; King of Abkhazia r. 923–930
Constantine; Duke of Kartli r. 923–926	Leon III; Duke of Kartli r. 926–957; King of Abkhazia r. 960–969	Demetrius III; King of Abkhazia r. 969–976	Theodosius III; King of Abkhazia r. 976–978	Bagrat	Anonymous daughter married to Shourta of Kakheti	Gurandukht married to Gurgen of Iberia	Anonymous daughter married to Abas I of Armenia
Bagrat II; King of Abkhazia r. 978–1014

== Bibliography ==
- Cyrille Toumanoff, Les dynasties de la Caucasie chrétienne de l'Antiquité jusqu'au XIXe siècle : Tables généalogiques et chronologiques, Rome, 1990
- Christian Settipani, Continuité des élites à Byzance durant les siècles obscurs. Les princes caucasiens et l'Empire du VIe au IXe siècle, Paris, de Boccard, 2006, 634 pàgs. (ISBN 978-2-7018-0226-8)
- Minorsky, V. F (March 1958). A History of Sharvān and Darband in the 10th-11th Centuries. Cambridge: W. Heffer & Sons Ltd. pp. 1–187.
- Shahinyan, A. K. (2008). "Последнее восстание в арабской провинции Арминийа (850-855 гг.)" [The last revolt in the Arab province of Arminiya (850-855)]. Вестник Санкт-Петербургского Университета. Серия 2: История (in Russian). 4 (1): 108–117.

Preceded by Theodosius II	King of Abkhazia; 855–864	Succeeded by George I
