= Demetrius III =

Demetrius III may refer to:

- Demetrius III of Abkhazia (fl. 969–976), King of Abkhazia
- Demetrius III Aniketos (fl. 100 BC), Indo-Greek king
- Demetrius III Eucaerus (died 88 BC), Seleucid king
- Demetrius (son of Alexander I of Georgia) (c. 1413–1453), co-King of Georgia, sometimes referred to as Demetrius III
