= Khopi Saint Nicholas Church =

Ruined medieval church at the village of Khopi in Abkhazia

Khopi Saint Nicholas Church ხოფის წმინდა ნიკოლოზის ეკლესია (in Georgian)
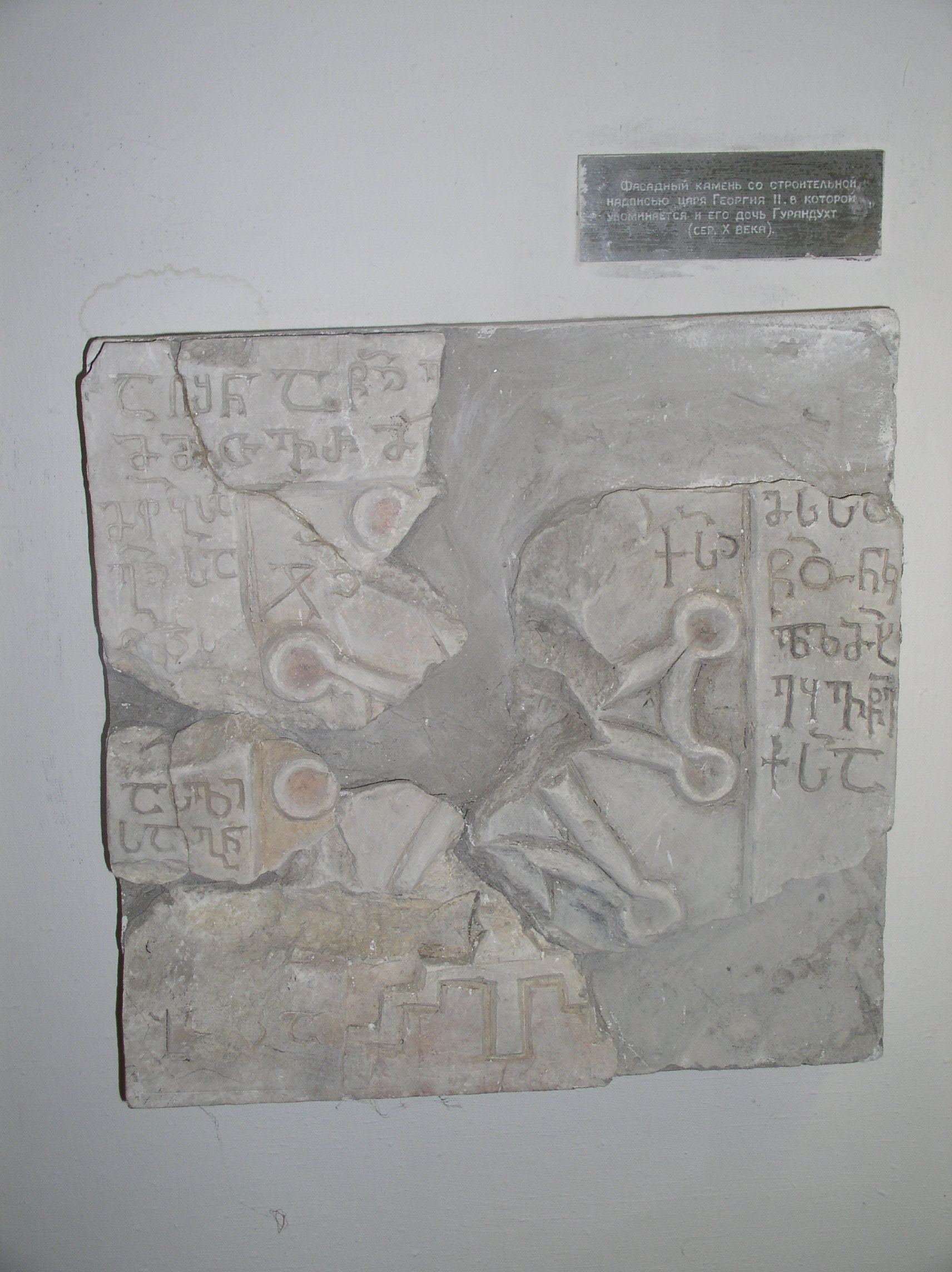
- A church inscription from Khopi. Now on display at the Sukhumi museum.

- Location within Abkhazia Location within Georgia

Religion
- Affiliation: Georgian Orthodox
- Province: Abkhazia

Location
- Location: (Georgia (country)) Khopi Abkhazia, Georgia
- Interactive map of Khopi Saint Nicholas Church ხოფის წმინდა ნიკოლოზის ეკლესია (in Georgian)
- Coordinates: 43°13′30″N 40°35′30″E

Architecture
- Type: Church
- Completed: 10th-12th century

The Saint Nicholas Church (Georgian: ხოფის წმინდა ნიკოლოზის ეკლესია, romanized: khopis ts'minda nik'olozis ek'lesia) is a ruined medieval church at the village of Khopi in Abkhazia, a breakaway region of Georgia. It is located some 18 km northwest of the town of Gudauta, at the foot of the Bzyb Range.

== History ==
The extant structure is a remnant of a hall church, probably built in the period of the 10th-12th century and covered by dense foliage. No contemporary historical records mention it. In 1967, while exploring the ruins, the art historian Leo Shervashidze found a limestone slab carrying a partially damaged Georgian inscription in the medieval asomtavruli script arranged in 14 lines around a Maltese-type cross carved in relief. The extant text relates that the church was constructed in the reign of King George around the time when Gurandukht was born, imploring St. Nicholas's intercession before the Christ. Based on the context and epigraphic features of the inscription, this king George is variously identified as George II of Abkhazia (r. 923–957) by Leo Shervashidze, George I of Georgia (r. 1014–1027) by Teimuraz Barnaveli, or George III of Georgia (r. 1156–1178) by Vladimir Silogava and Andrey Vinogradov and Denis Beletsky. All these monarchs had a daughter named Gurandukht.
