= Adarnase of Abkhazia =

9th-century Georgian king

Adarnase ადარნასე

King of Abkhazia
- Reign: 887 – 893
- Predecessor: John
- Successor: Bagrat I
- Spouse: A daughter of Guaram Mampali
- Dynasty: Shavliani
- Religion: Georgian Orthodox Church

Adarnase Shavliani (Georgian: ადარნასე შავლიანი) was the King of Abkhazia between 880 and 887. He succeeded his father, the usurper John Shavliani, to the throne but was deposed and put to death by Bagrat I, the son of Demetrius II.

The name Adarnase derives from Middle Persian Ādurnarsēh, with the second component of the word (Nase) being the Georgian attestation of the Middle Persian name Narseh, which ultimately derives from Avestan nairyō.saŋya-. The Middle Persian name Narseh also exists in Georgian as Nerse. The name Ādurnarsēh appears in the Armenian language as Atrnerseh.

== See also ==
- Divan of the Abkhazian Kings

Preceded by John Shavliani	King of Abkhazia; 880–887/888	Succeeded by Bagrat I
