= Bedia Chalice =

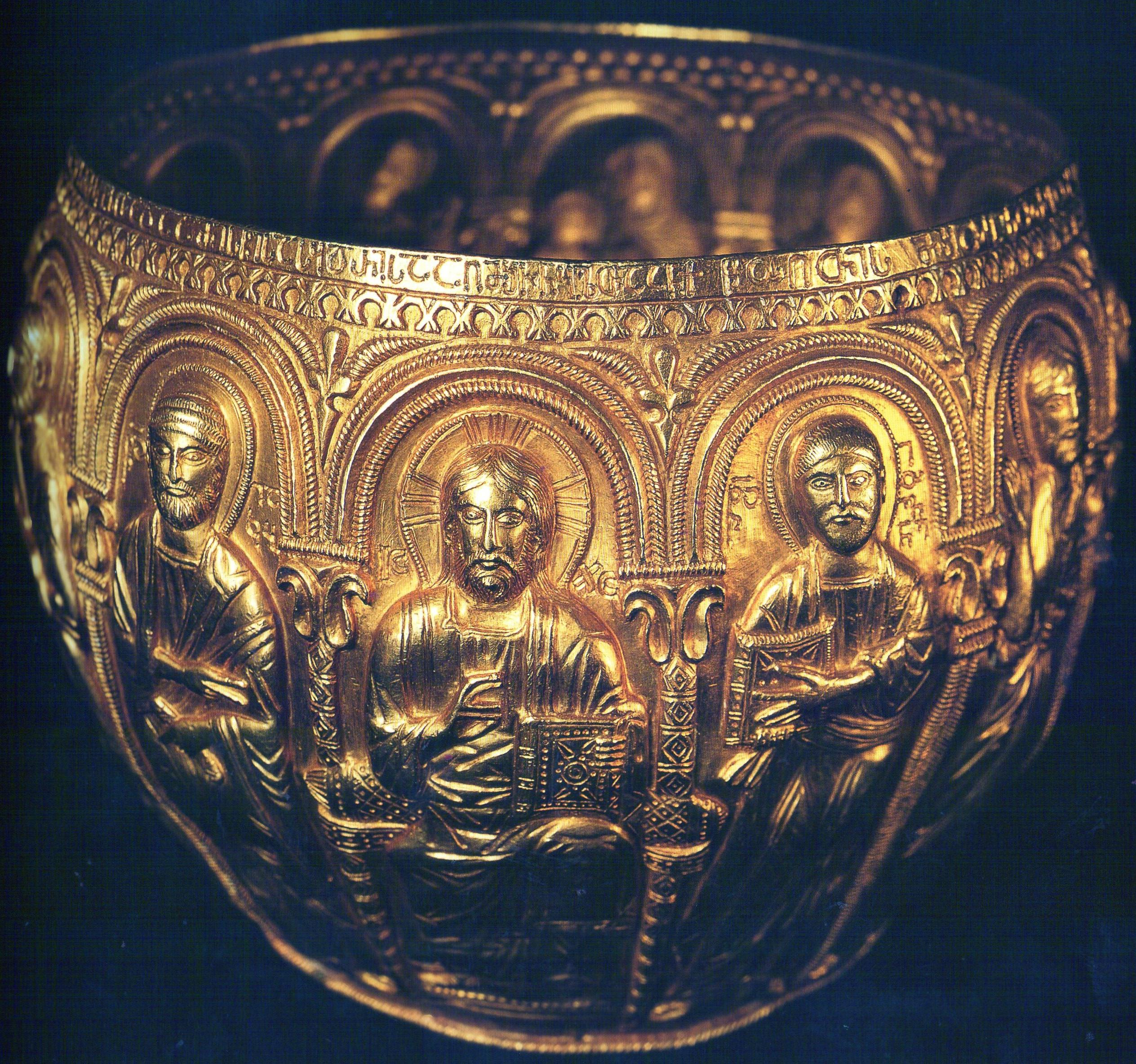
- Material: Gold
- Created: c. 999
- Present location: Art Museum of Georgia, Tbilisi

The Bedia Chalice (Georgian: ბედიის თასი, romanized: bediis tasi) is a piece of medieval Georgian goldsmithery, a liturgical vessel made of gold and richly decorated. Dated to c. 999, the chalice was commissioned by King Bagrat III for the Bedia Monastery in Abkhazia. Only the bowl of the vessel is preserved and is now in at the Georgian National Museum in Tbilisi, Georgia.

== History ==
The chalice was a donation by King Bagrat III and his mother, Queen Gurandukht, to the new church at Bedia, which was completed in 999. The base of the vessel was subsequently lost and restored in the 16th century at the behest of Germane Chkhetidze, Metropolitan Bishop of Bedia, as mentioned in a Georgian inscription. The item was preserved in the sacristy of the Ilori Church, when the historian Dimitri Bakradze visited it in 1865 and reported the danger of its being lost. The base then again disappeared. The surviving bowl was removed to Tbilisi, in the Treasure Chamber of the Georgian State Art Museum, now Georgian National Museum, in 1930.

== Description ==
The bowl of the Bedia vessel is 14 cm high and 14 cm in diameter; it weighs 752 g. The piece is made of one sheet of gold, with all figures and details worked in repoussé. The entire outer surface is framed and divided into 12 segments by a continuous arcade. The figures depicted are the enthroned Christ Pantokrator and the Virgin Hodegetria on the opposite side. Between them are standing figures of ten apostles, five on each side, holding rotuli in their hands. Christ is identified by a Greek inscription and all apostles by the Georgian texts; there is no inscription associated with the Virgin. The Georgian-language inscription (Note: The inscription reads in asomtavruli: ႼႫႨႣႠႭ ႶႫႰႧႨႱႫႸႭႡႤႪႭ ႫႤႭႾ ႤႷႠႥ ႼႨႬႠႸႤ ႻႨႱႠ ႸႤႬႨႱႠ ႡႠႢႰႠႲ ႠႴႾႠႦႧႠ ႫႤႴႤႱႠ ႣႠ ႣႤႣႠႱႠ ႫႠႧႱႠ ႢႳႰႠႬႣႳႾႲ ႣႤႣႭႴႠႪႱႠ ႠႫႨႱ ႡႠႰႻႨႫႨႱႠ ႸႤႫႼႨႰႥႤႪႧႠ ႠႫႨႬ; in mkhedruli transcription: Georgian: „წმიდაო ღმრთისმშობელო, მეოხ ეყავ წინაშე ძისა შენისა ბაგრატ აფხაზთა მეფესა და დედასა მათსა გურანდუხტ დედოფალსა, ამის ბარძიმისა შემწირველთა, ამის საკურთხევლისა შემამკობელთა და ამის წმიდისა საყდრისა აღმშენებელთა. ამინ“, romanized: „ts'midao ghmrtismshobelo, meokh eq'av ts'inashe dzisa shenisa bagrat' apkhazta mepesa da dedasa matsa gurandukht' dedopalsa, amis bardzimisa shemts'irvelta, amis sak'urtkhevlisa shemamk'obelta da amis ts'midisa saq'drisa aghmshenebelta. amin“, translated as: "Holy Mother of God, intercede before your son for Bagrat, king of the Abkhazians, and his mother, the queen Gurandukht, the commissioners of this vessel, the decorators of this altar, and the builders of this holy church. Amen.") just below the rim, in finely carved asomtavruli script, mentions King Bagrat and Queen Gurandukht.

The Bedia chalice is notable for the orderly and rhythmic composition and decorative details which are endogenously Georgian, but exhibit some stylistic affinities with the contemporary Byzantine ivory icons and enameled chalices in the Treasury of San Marco, Venice. Yet, robust monumental effect of the artwork of the Bedia chalice is unparalleled.
