= Gurandukht =

Gurandukht (Georgian: გურანდუხტი), also Guarandukht (გუარანდუხტი), is a feminine given name in Georgia, ultimately derived from the Iranian Bahramdukht. It was particularly popular among the medieval Georgian nobility. According to the Georgian Civil Registry, only 43 women in Georgia bore this name as of 2012.

== Notable people ==
- Gurandukht, mother of Bagrat III of Georgia
- Gurandukht, daughter of George I of Georgia
- Gurandukht, wife of David IV of Georgia
