= Bagrat II of Iberia =

Bagrat II

King of the Iberians
- Reign: 958–994
- Predecessor: Sumbat I of Iberia
- Successor: Gurgen of Iberia
- Died: 994
- Issue: Gurgen of Iberia
- Dynasty: Bagrationi dynasty
- Father: Sumbat I of Iberia
- Religion: Georgian Orthodox Church

Bagrat II (Georgian: ბაგრატ II) (c. 937–994) was a Georgian prince of the Bagratid dynasty of Tao-Klarjeti and the titular king (mepe) of Iberia-Kartli from 958 until his death. He was also known as Bagrat Regueni (ბაგრატ რეგუენი), "Regueni" being a moniker rendered in English as "the Simple".

Bagrat was the elder son of Sumbat I, whom he succeeded as “king of the Iberians” in 958. In spite of having a royal status, Bagrat only ruled northern or Hither Tao and, unlike his father, was not bestowed with the high Byzantine court title of curopalates, which was granted to Bagrat’s cousin and the ruler of southern or Thither Tao, Adarnase V. Professor Ekvtime Takaishvili explains Bagrat’s epithet "Regueni" by his younger age upon his accession to the throne. Bagrat frequently appeared as a collaborator of his relative David III of Tao, the most influential person among the Bagratids of that time, aiding him against the Rawadids of Azerbaijan and even against his own son and co-king Gurgen during a brief split among the Bagratids. By 978, Gurgen had become a de facto king of Iberia, while his son Bagrat III had been adopted and designed as heir by David III of Tao, thus setting the stage for future unification of various Georgian polities into a single Bagratid realm.

Bagrat had two sons:

- Gurgen (died 1008), his successor as king of Iberia
- Sumbat (died 992)

| Preceded by Sumbat I | King of Iberia; 958–994 | Succeeded by Gurgen |
