= Divan of the Abkhazian Kings =

Georgian historical text

The Divan of the Abkhazian Kings (Georgian: აფხაზთა მეფეთა დივანი, romanized: apkhazta mepeta divani, which is often translated as the Chronicles of the Abkhazian Kings) is a short medieval document composed in Georgian in the late 10th or early 11th century. It has come down to us as a 15th-century copy. The text was first studied and published by the Georgian scholar Ekvtime Takaishvili. It has also been translated into English and Russian.

It is usually attributed to the first king of all-Georgia, Bagrat III, who began his reign as the Abkhazian king in 978. Somewhat of a manifesto, this document may have been issued by Bagrat, a representative of the new dynasty of the Bagrationi, in support of his rights to the Abkhazian throne.

The Divan lists 22 successive rulers from Anos to Bagrat, and styles each of them as “king” (Georgian: mepe) (though until the mid-780s they functioned as the archons under the Byzantine authority). The text does provide the information about the family relationships among these rulers as well as the duration of the last 11 kings’ reigns, but lacks chronology. The two kings of the Shavliani clan (878–887) are omitted probably because they were regarded as usurpers. The dates and achievements of most of the early Abkhazian rulers remain conjectural.

The names below are given in original transliteration. The dates are as per Prince Cyril Toumanoff and other modern scholars.

- Anos (ანოს) (c. 510–530)
- Ghozar (ღოზარ) (c. 530–550)
- Istvine (ისტვინე) (c. 550–580)
- Phinictios (ფინიქტიოს) (c. 580–610)
- Barnucius (ბარნუკ) (c. 610–640)
- Demetrius I (დემეტრე) (c. 640–660)
- Theodosius I (თეოდოს) (c. 660–680)
- Constantine I (კონსტანტინე) (c. 680–710)
- Theodor (თეოდორ) (c. 710–730)
- Constantine II (კონსტანტინე) (c. 730–745)
- Leon I (ლეონ) (c. 745–767)
- Leon II (ლეონ) (c. 767–811)
- Theodosius II (თეოდოს) (c. 811–837)
- Demetrius II (დემეტრე) (c. 837–872)
- George I (გიორგი) (c. 872–878)
- Bagrat I (ბაგრატ) (c. 887–898)
- Constantine III (კონსტანტინე) (c. 898–916)
- George II (გიორგი) (c. 916–960)
- Leon III (ლეონ) (c. 960–969)
- Demetrius III (დემეტრე) (c. 969–976)
- Theodosius III (თეოდოსი) (c. 976–978)
- Bagrat III (ბაგრატი) (978–1014)

== See also ==
- The Georgian Chronicles
- Conversion of Kartli (chronicle)
