= Marie-Félicité Brosset =

French historian (1802–1880)

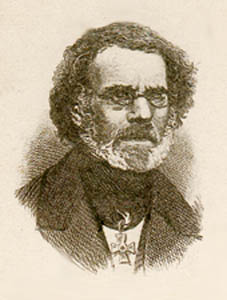
- Born: 24 January 1802; Paris, France
- Died: 3 September 1880 (aged 78); Châtellerault

Marie-Félicité Brosset (24 January 1802 – 3 September 1880) was a French historian and scholar who worked mostly in the Russian Empire. He specialized in Georgian and Armenian studies.

Brosset's interest in the Caucasus developed while still in France. By the time he relocated to Saint Petersburg, of his 47 published works 36 were dedicated to Georgia, an interest he kept up throughout his career.

== Early life and first works ==
Marie-Félicité Brosset was born in Paris into the family of a poor merchant, who died a few months after his birth. His mother destined him to the Church. He attended the theological seminaries in Orléans, where he studied Greek, Latin, Hebrew, and Arabic.

Back in Paris, he attended lectures delivered at the Collège de France by Carl Benedict Hase (Greek), Antoine-Isaac Silvestre de Sacy (Arabic), and Jean-Pierre Abel-Rémusat (Chinese). He was elected to the Asiatic Society in 1825. His son, Laurent, reported "...after five years of unceasing effort, he suddenly gave up.." and he burned all the material he had created.

From 1826 he devoted himself to the Armenian and Georgian languages, as well as their history and culture. He had finally found his true vocation. Books, texts, teachers, and documents were all scarce, however. For his work in Armenian, he was helped by Antoine-Jean Saint-Martin. For his Georgian work, he had to create his own dictionary from the Georgian translation of the Bible, which was faithful to the Greek text.

=== Russia ===
Invited to Saint Petersburg in 1837 by the president of the Imperial Academy of Sciences, Count Sergey Uvarov, Brosset was elected a member a year later. He journeyed to the Caucasus in 1847–48. Brosset translated—and commented on—the major medieval and early-modern Georgian chroniclers. He published his work in seven volumes from 1849 to 1858. His magnum opus, Histoire de la Géorgie, was a long-standing authority on the history of Georgia. Brosset also published the correspondence between the czars and the kings of Georgia that occurred from 1639 to 1770.

From 1861 to 1868, Brosset focused on his series regarding Armenian historians, but continued to work on them until 1876. Brosset wrote over 250 works on Georgian and Armenian history and culture overall.

Brosset left Russia in May 1880 and retired to his daughter's residence in Châtellerault. He died there several months later, on 3 September. His son, Laurent, contributed heavily to the knowledge of his life and works.

== Works ==
=== Lists of works ===
- Brosset, Laurent. Bibliographie analytique — 271 titles, not counting supplements. Alphabetical index: p. 585-704
- "Liste des travaux de M. Brosset", p. 1, at Google Books in Bulletin de l'Académie impériale des sciences de Saint-Pétersbourg. Vol. 27, 1880, p. 1 — 237 titles

=== Selected works ===
- (1837) Éléments de la langue géorgienne at Google Books. Paris: Imprimerie royale — Reprint: Osnabrück: Biblio, 1974, LVI, 366 p. ISBN 3-7648-0194-8
- (1848–58) Histoire de la Géorgie depuis l’Antiquité jusqu’au XIX^{e} siècle at Google Books, 7 volumes, Saint Petersburg, 694 p.
  - Introduction et tables des matières at Google Books, 1858
  - Histoire de la Géorgie depuis l'Antiquité jusqu'au XIX^{e} siècle, Introduction, CCXIV p., and Tables of contents, XCVI p., Saint Petersburg: Académie impériale des sciences, 1858.
  - Volume 1 Histoire ancienne, jusqu'en 1469 at Google Books, 1849
  - Histoire de la Géorgie depuis l'Antiquité jusqu'au XIX^{e} siècle at Google Books, Partie 2: Histoire moderne. Livraison 2, 1857
  - Additions et éclaircissements à l'histoire de la Géorgie depuis l'Antiquité jusqu'en 1469 de J.-C. at Google Books, Saint Petersburg: Académie impériale des sciences, 1851, 494 p.
- (1851) Rapports sur un voyage archéologique exécuté dans la Géorgie et dans l'Arménie en 1847-1848 sous les auspices du Prince Vorontzof Lieutenant du Caucase, p. PP9, at Google Books, Saint Petersburg: Académie impériale des sciences, 64 p.
- (1860–61) Les ruines d’Ani, capitale de l'Arménie sous les rois bagratides aux X^{e} et XI^{e} siècles, 2 volumes, Saint Petersburg .
- (1862) "Analyse critique de la Всеобщая история de Vardan", p. 1, at Google Books in Mémoires de l'Académie Impériale des Sciences de Saint-Pétersbourg, vol. 4, issue 9, 30 p.
- Collection d'historiens arméniens: dix ouvrages sur l'histoire de l'Arménie et des pays adjacents du X^{e} au XIX^{e} siècle, reprinted by APA-Philo Press, 1978 ISBN 9060223489.

== Bibliography ==
- Bouatchidzé, Gaston. La Vie de Marie Brosset, Nantes: Éditions du Petit Véhicule, 1996, 195 p. ISBN 2842730003 (in French)
- Brosset, Laurent (1887). Bibliographie analytique des ouvrages de Monsieur Marie-Félicité Brosset (1824-1887). Saint Petersburg: Imprimerie de l'Académie impériale des Sciences. (Written by his son Laurent Brosset; includes a biography) (in French)
- Khintibidze, Elguja. Georgian literature in European scholarship (in English)
- Rapp, Stephen H. Studies in medieval Georgian historiography: early texts and Eurasian contexts, Peeters Publishers, 2003, 522 p. ISBN 9789042913189 (in English)
- Шилов, Л. А. Броссе Марий Иванович – Detailed biography, Russian National Library (in Russian).
