= Gurgen of Iberia =

Gurgen გურგენი
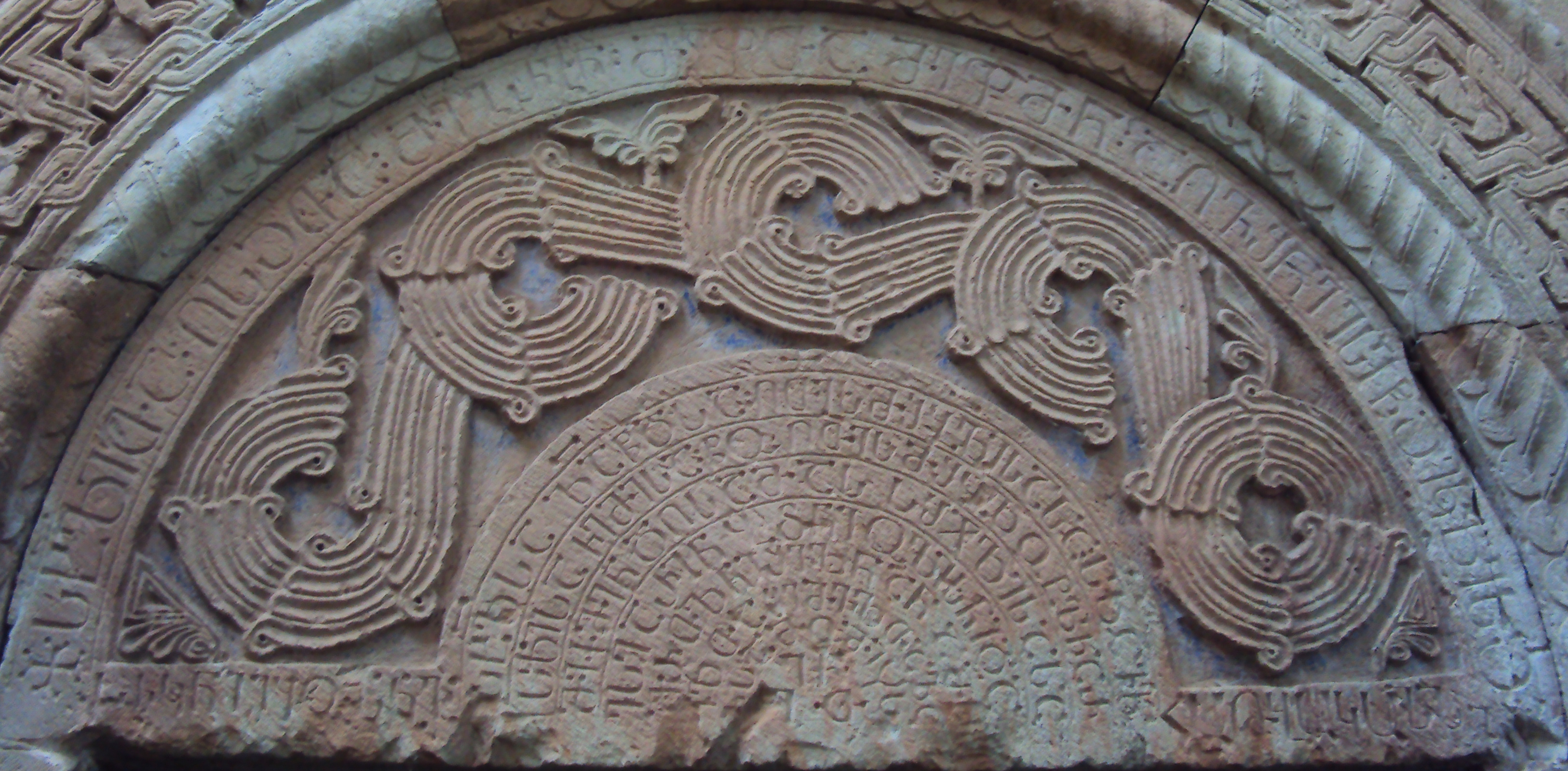
- An inscription of "Gurgen, King of Kings" at the Ishkhani church dated to 1006.

King of Kings of the Iberians
- Reign: 994–1008
- Predecessor: Bagrat II of Iberia
- Successor: Bagrat III of Georgia
- Died: 1008
- Spouse: Gurandukht of Abkhazia
- Issue: Bagrat III of Georgia
- Dynasty: Bagrationi dynasty
- Father: Bagrat II of Iberia
- Religion: Georgian Orthodox Church

Gurgen (Georgian: გურგენი) also known as Gurgen Magistros, Gurgen II Magistros (also transliterated as Gourgen and in some sources Gurgan) of the Bagrationi dynasty, was King (mepe) of Iberia-Kartli with the title of the King of Kings of the Georgians from 994 until his death in 1008. Magistros was a title bestowed upon him by the Byzantine Emperor Basil II.

== Biography ==
Representative of the Kartli line of the Georgian Bagratids (Bagrationi) of Tao-Klarjeti, Gurgen was the son of Bagrat II, who reigned as King of the Georgians from 958 to 994. Gurgen was married to Gurandukht, a daughter of the Abkhazian king George II. She gave birth, in circa 960, to a son called Bagrat. The latter was adopted by his kinsman, the powerful prince David III Kuropalates of Tao/Tayk, as his heir. In 975, Bagrat, still in his teens, was installed by David as a ruler in Kartli under the regency of Gurgen. Three years later, Bagrat was crowned King of the Abkhazians, while Gurgen remained his co-ruler in the Kartlian lands and helped his son in an uncompromised struggle against the aristocratic opposition.

In 989, Bagrat planned to inflict a final blow to the powerful noble Rati of Kldekari who held a large fiefdom in Trialeti. Gurgen, together with his army, was waiting for his son at the boundary of Shavsheti, when David of Tao, being misinformed that his kinsmen intended to ambush his possessions, dispersed Gurgen’s troops in a sudden attack, forcing him to flee to the fortress of Tsep’ti. In this brief conflict Gurgen’s father, Bagrat II, sided with David. The Bagratids subsequently reconciled, but David’s unsuccessful uprising against the Byzantine Empire and an ensuing treaty with Emperor Basil II destroyed a previous arrangement, by which David had made his adopted son, Bagrat (Gurgen’s son) his heir to his extensive principality.

In 994, Bagrat II died, and Gurgen succeeded him, crowning himself King of Kings of the Georgians. This kingdom comprised Hither Tao, Shavsheti, Meskheti, Javakheti, Ajaria and some minor lands in historic Tao-Klarjeti. Upon David of Tao’s death in 1000, Gurgen, and Bagrat met with Basil but, unable to prevent the annexation of David’s realm to the Byzantine Empire, were forced to recognize the new borders. On this occasion, Bagrat was bestowed with the Byzantine title of kuropalates, and Gurgen with that of magistros, actually the competing titles since the dignity conferred upon the son was more esteemed than that granted to the father. This was done by the emperor, as the Georgian chronicles relate, to turn Gurgen against Bagrat, but he seriously miscalculated. Later the same year, Gurgen attempted to take David Kuropalates’ succession by force, but the Byzantine commander Nikephoros Ouranos, dux of Antioch, made him retreat.

== Legacy ==
Gurgen died in 1008, leaving his throne to his son, King Bagrat of Abkhazia, enabling the latter to become the first king of a unified Georgian realm.

Preceded by Bagrat II	King of Kings of the Georgians; 994–1008	Succeeded by Bagrat III
