= Ashot the Swift =

Ashot the Swift (Georgian: აშოტ კისკასი, romanized: ashot' k'isk'asi; died in 939) was a Georgian prince of the Bagrationi dynasty from Tao-Klarjeti. He was nicknamed Kiskas, meaning "the Swift"

Ashot was a son of Bagrat I of Klarjeti. He was married to the sister of George II of Abkhazia. Together they had a daughter who was married to Gurgen II of Tao. Ashot was in possession of the important fortified town of Artanuji, which he probably inherited from his elder brother, Gurgen I of Klarjeti. According to Constantine Porphyrogenitus' De Administrando Imperio, Ashot was on bad terms with his son-in-law Gurgen of Tao, who was determined to take Artanuji as his own. Ashot offered to hand the town over to the Byzantines in return for their protection. The Byzantine plenipotentiary, the patrikios Constans fulfilled his mission to confirm Gurgen of Tao as magistros and proceeded to occupy Artanuji with the Chaldian army. The Georgian princes, competing with Ashot, protested and threatened to go over to the Arabs unless it was restored. The emperor Romanos I Lekapenos had to disown Constans's action to pacify them. Ashot the Swift was given back Artanuji, but Gurgen soon captured the town and gave his father-in-law some land in compensation, which also he later annexed.

Ashot died in 939 as a refugee at the court of his brother-in-law, George II.
