= Abas I of Armenia =

King of Bagratid Armenia from 928 to 953

Abas I of Armenia Աբաս Ա
- King of Armenia; King of Ani

King of Armenia
- Reign: 928 – 953
- Predecessor: Ashot II
- Successor: Ashot III
- Issue: Ashot III; Mushegh I
- Dynasty: Bagratuni
- Father: Smbat I

Abas (Armenian: Աբաս Ա, romanized: Abas A) was king of Bagratid Armenia from 929 to 953. He was a member of the Bagratid (Bagratuni) royal dynasty. He was the son of Smbat I and the brother of Ashot II of Armenia, whom he succeeded. In contrast to the reign of his predecessors, Abas's reign was largely peaceful, and he focused on rebuilding the war-torn kingdom and developing his capital at Kars. His brother and predecessor, King Ashot II of Armenia (914–929), freed Armenia from the troops of Yusuf (901–927), the emir of Atropatene, and ended the Armenian Kingdom's formal dependence on the Arab Caliphate. During this same time, two other rulers who held the title of "King of Armenia" were also active: Gagik Artsruni and Ashot Shapuhyan Bagratuni. Under Ashot Yerkat, they were under his authority, but by the start of Abas's rule, they were acting as independent rulers. Abas did not oppose them directly. Instead, he gradually strengthened his position and eventually established supremacy in Armenia and South Caucasus.

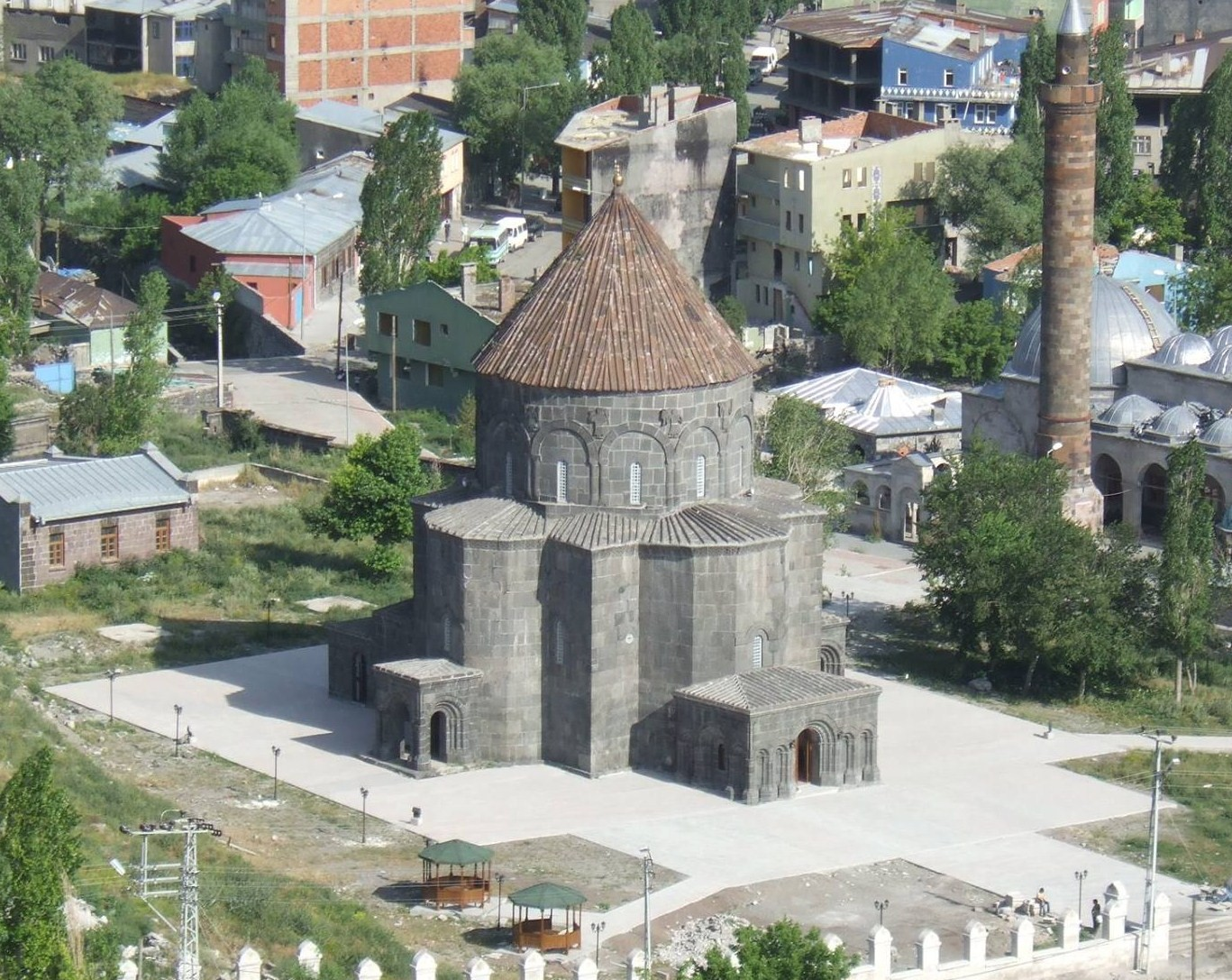
The Cathedral of Kars (now a mosque), built during Abas's reign.

== Early life and accession ==
Abas, the youngest son of King Smbat I (891–914), is first mentioned in Armenian sources after the murder of his father (January 7, 914), when he and his brother Ashot II of Armenia left Armenia, which was suffering from the incursions of the troops of Yusuf, the emir of Atropatene. Abas traveled to Iberia, where he married the daughter of Georgian prince Gurgen, and later returned to his homeland. Ashot subsequently summoned his brother Abas and the Georgian prince Gurgen, Abas's father-in-law, to his court.

Upon his return, Abas continuously supported his brother in the struggle to liberate Armenia. After liberating the central part of Armenia in 917, Ashot departed for Gugark alongside Abas. The local garrison commanders of the Samshvilde fortress (which had been transformed into a royal domain during the reign of Smbat I) were the brothers Vasak and Ashot Gntuni, who had been appointed by Smbat I and concurrently served as overseers of the province surrounding the fortress. Ashot demanded their submission. Taking advantage of the fact that Ashot had dismissed his army and taken refuge near the Sakuret fortress with only 250 soldiers alongside his brother Abas, the Gntunis gathered troops, received assistance from the Arabs of Tbilisi and Caucasian highlanders, and attacked the camp of Ashot and Abas with a force of four thousand men. The brothers quickly prepared their small force for battle and launched a counterattack, decisively defeating their opponents. Some of the captured Arabs were executed, others had their noses and ears cut off, while the Christians were released after being stripped of their possessions. Only Vasak Gntuni managed to escape with a group of soldiers and take refuge in Samshvilde. Following these events, Ashot and Abas went to the Georgian prince Gurgen. Ashot appointed Abas as the Prince of Princes of Armenia. During the reign of the early Bagratuni kings, this position was customarily granted to members of the royal family who were later destined to inherit the Armenian throne, making him a potential heir to the Armenian throne. Abas's aspirations for the throne, fueled by holding this position, ultimately led to an irreconcilable hostility between the two brothers after Ashot married the daughter of Sahak Sevada, the prince of Gardman, in 918. During the wedding ceremony, he was presented with a crown and gifts sent by Yusuf. He accepted the crown and sent gifts in return to Yusuf. Yusuf was eventually forced to recognize Ashot's supreme status in Armenia. Sometime later, Ashot launched a campaign against Ashot Shapuhyan, who had fortified himself in Dvin. In a battle that took place near the gates of Dvin, Ashot's army suffered a defeat due to Grigor, the son of Sahak Sevada, forcing the king to retreat to the domains of the Georgian prince Gurgen. After securing auxiliary troops from him, he returned to Vagharshapat. Soon after, Ashot invited Abas and his father-in-law, the Georgian prince Gurgen, to join him in Shirak. The king bestowed great honors upon them. However, Abas and Gurgen conspired against Ashot. The king managed to escape from Shirakavan and, taking Abas's son with him, departed for Utik.

Shortly after the failure of the conspiracy, Ashot traveled to Gugark to punish the Georgian prince Gurgen. Taking Adarnase, the King of Klarjeti (referred to as the "King of Georgians"), with him, he campaigned against Gurgen. Abas and Ashot Shapuhyan rushed to the latter's aid. Ashot Shapuhyan was also a son-in-law of Gurgen. By utilizing his two sons-in-law, both of whom harbored claims to the Armenian throne, Gurgen severely endangered the internal security of the Armenian kingdom. These political maneuvers were aimed in particular at establishing control over the Samshvilde fortress and the surrounding cantons. During this period, the interests of Abas and Ashot Shapuhyan coincided, although their alliance was temporary. Under the pressure of the combined forces of Ashot and Adarnase, the opposing troops began to retreat and gradually yield their positions, considering the possibility of surrender. At that time, news arrived of unlawful acts committed by the Prince of Gardman, Sahak Sevada, prompting Ashot to swiftly depart for Utik. Following these events in 919, information regarding Abas in the historical sources is interrupted for a prolonged period. Due to these gaps in the record, widespread disagreements have arisen among researchers.

== Beginning of reign ==
In the early 930s, a system of divided rule emerged in Armenia. Apart from Abas Bagratuni, two other Armenian kings ruled and operated in the country to varying extents: Gagik Artsruni and Ashot Shapuhyan. Since the latter two had been proclaimed kings much earlier, the role and influence of Abas Bagratuni in the country's developments during the first stage of his reign was secondary.

During the reign of Abas's predecessor, Ashot II Yerkat, Bagratuni supremacy was established in Armenia and Transcaucasia. As early as 915, the Byzantine Empire recognized him as the "Prince of Princes," granting him the corresponding throne and title. Ashot's supreme status was also confirmed by the Abbasid Caliphate: in 919, the newly appointed official of the Arab Caliphate, Subuq, established peace with him and recognized him as "Shahanshah" (King of Kings).

Following the death of Ashot, this supremacy shifted to Vaspurakan. The title of "Prince of Princes" and the corresponding status were granted to Gagik Artsruni by Byzantium. The Caliphate adopted the same policy: in 927, Yusuf, the emir of Atropatene, handed over the supremacy of Armenia and Georgia to Gagik Artsruni, and later, in 940, Sayf al-Dawla, the ruler of Diyar Bakr who had entered Armenia, met with the Artsruni ruler in Ahlat and recognized him as the "King of Armenia and Georgia".

Under these political conditions, Abas was not initially regarded by the major foreign powers as the direct successor of Ashot. Having spent much of Ashot's reign away from Armenia, he had less political influence than Gagik Artsruni. For this reason, Byzantium referred to him merely with the court title of "magistros".

=== Coronation ===
In older historiographical traditions, hypotheses circulated claiming that before his death (928), Ashot reconciled with Abas, or that Abas's coronation was organized in Vaspurakan with the support of Gagik Artsruni and by the Armenian Catholicos residing there.

The facts indicate that Abas and Ashot never reconciled: Abas never returned to the domains of Ayrarat during his brother's lifetime; moreover, when Ashot marched north to punish the Georgian prince Gurgen, it was Abas who assisted the latter, acting against the Shahanshah of Armenians and Georgians. Furthermore, Gagik Artsruni, who aspired to pan-Armenian supremacy and harbored ambitions of becoming the absolute ruler in Armenia, had no motive to organize the coronation of a rival king.

On this chronology, Ashot died in 929 or 930, and Abas's coronation is likewise dated to 929 or 930, after which he returned to Ayrarat.

=== Bagratuni territories in Ayrarat ===
At the time of his establishment in Ayrarat, Abas's authority was strictly limited and did not extend over the entire territory of the province. Ashot Shapuhyan had maintained his power in Ayrarat since 916 (reigning for about 18 years, until 934). The latter did not recognize Abas's rights and was established in the key centers of the province: he possessed the eastern part of the Arsharunik canton, including the former Bagratuni capital of Bagaran (where the Armenian Catholicos also resided), and the town of Koghb in the Chakatk canton. At the same time, the southern regions of Ayrarat—the cantons of Tsaghkotn, Kogovit, and Masyatsotn—were under the direct control of Gagik Artsruni. Abas therefore began his reign amid a fragmented political landscape and faced Gagik Artsruni, who controlled Vaspurakan and had greater resources.

=== Early reign ===
One of Abas Bagratuni's first actions was the selection of a new capital. Kars was chosen as the royal seat, which by the late 9th century had evolved into a city with a citadel and suburbs. Kars was referred to as a "royal city-fortress." By Abas's order, construction of the Cathedral of the Holy Apostles began here in 930 and was completed in 942.

Limited information has been preserved regarding the initial period of Abas's reign. During this time, the role of Gagik Artsruni, who was recognized by Byzantium as the "Prince of Princes," was more significant. Simultaneously, Abas was addressed simply as "magistros" by Emperors Romanos I Lekapenos and Constantine VII Porphyrogenitus, since the title of Prince of Princes belonged to Gagik Artsruni. In 927, the title of "King of Armenia and Georgia" with the corresponding status was transferred to Gagik Artsruni. In the early 930s, Gagik Artsruni sent a letter to Emperor Romanos I of Byzantium proposing to place Armenia under the empire's protection, pay taxes, and enter into communion with the Greek Church. In 931–932, based on the letter from Gagik Artsruni and other Armenian princes, Byzantine forces attacked Muslim domains, ravaged Berkri and Khlat, and took part of the population captive.

Abas's early reign was marked by political rivalry, with two other kings also active in Armenia and Abas's primacy not yet established. Given these circumstances, Emperor Romanos I Lekapenos attempted to recognize a third person as the supreme king of Armenia, bypassing both Abas and Gagik Artsruni. To this end, an anonymous letter was sent to Armenia offering the title of "Prince of Princes" to the recipient. In exchange for allying with the empire, this individual would be granted the honorary title and tasked with compelling Gagik Artsruni, Abas, and the other princes to submit to him.

Ashot Shapuhyan was the third king ruling in Armenia during this period. The likely recipient of the letter was Ashot Shapuhyan, who, having lost the patronage of Atropatene, may have sought closer ties with Byzantium. He had been crowned in 916, before Abas, which would explain the Byzantine proposal to place him above Abas. Following the death of Ashot, taking advantage of Abas's absence, Ashot Shapuhyan seized several regions of Ayrarat, including Bagaran, where the Armenian Catholicos had taken refuge in 923. In 934, Ashot Shapuhyan passed away, and likely due to being childless, his domains passed to Abas. As a result, two kings remained in Armenia, holding equal positions.

In 937/938, during the period of instability in Atropatene, a small Arab army invaded Armenia. The force reached Dvin via the Goghtn-Nakhchivan-Sharur route, from where tax collectors and troops were dispatched to Ayrarat, capturing the canton of Aragatsotn, which belonged to Abas's domains. Abas called on Gagik Artsruni for help, but before his arrival, he fought the adversary alone, was defeated, and retreated to Iberia into the domains of the Georgian prince Gurgen. Soon, the Vaspurakan army arrived to help, defeated the enemy on the banks of the Aras, besieged Dvin, and ended the siege in exchange for tribute and hostages. Scholars differ over the leader of the campaign and its chronology. The direction of the campaign suggests that it originated in Atropatene. The events took place during the catholicosate of Yeghishe (937–942). Considering that Daysam, who ruled Atropatene from 938, maintained friendly relations with Gagik Artsruni, the campaign was dated to 937–938, when Lashkari ruled Atropatene. The victory contributed to the stabilization of Armenia during the early years of Abas's reign.

=== Consolidation of Abas's power ===
According to the information of Ibn Hawqal, until the year 325 of the Hijra (November 19, 936 – November 7, 937), the neighboring Muslim rulers of Armenia periodically invaded, took captives, and caused damage to the local Christians, even though the latter paid taxes and were considered protected subjects (dhimmi) according to Islamic law. After the year 325 of the Hijra, the situation changed. One of the significant events of 937 was Lashkari's invasion of Armenia and his subsequent defeat. After this, the troops of the neighboring emirates did not invade Armenia for a long time. This pause was due to the new situation established in Atropatene: following Lashkari's defeat, the region gradually passed under the rule of Daysam ibn Ibrahim, who maintained friendly relations with Gagik Artsruni.

The history of the first period of Abas Bagratuni's reign is closely tied to the events that unfolded around Armenia in the late 930s. During this period, the Hamdanid emirate grew stronger in Northern Mesopotamia, establishing direct contacts with the southwestern regions of Armenia. In 935, the future ruler of Northern Mesopotamia, Hasan ibn Abu al-Hayja al-Hamdani, having been subjected to an attack by the caliph's vizier Ibn Muqla, took refuge in the Andzevatsik canton. At that time, the "kings of Armenia" were under his suzerainty.

In 939, Sayf al-Dawla campaigned against the city of Karin. The Byzantines, learning of the approach of his army, destroyed the city of Havchich located near Karin and retreated, which caused Sayf al-Dawla to turn back and spend the winter in Alzn.

In 940, Sayf al-Dawla entered Armenia once again. Meeting the "king of Armenia and Georgia" in Khlat, he honored him, but at the same time seized certain fortresses. A number of Armenian princes also submitted to Sayf al-Dawla. Afterward, his army marched from Khlat toward the domains of the prince of Taron, Ibn Thornik, captured Mush and destroyed one of the local churches. In Tatvan, Sayf al-Dawla summoned for a meeting Gagik, son of Derenik; Ahmad ibn Abd al-Rahman, the emir of Khlat, Artske, Archesh and Berkri; Abd al-Hamid, the emir of Manazkert, Dasht al-Vark and Hark; as well as Ashot, son of Grigor, the prince of princes of Armenia. As a result, Gagik Artsruni ceded the fortresses of Shahran and al-Hamid to him, Ahmad ibn Abd al-Rahman ceded the city of Baghesh, and Ashot ceded Sasun. King Abas did not intervene in these events, as the operations unfolded in the southwestern regions of Armenia, and he did not yet have sufficient resources to oppose Sayf al-Dawla. By the late 930s, the threat posed to the Armenian kingdom by Atropatene was almost neutralized. The ruler of Atropatene, Daysam (938–941), was absorbed in internal problems and at the same time maintained friendly relations with Gagik Artsruni, thanks to which he was able to ensure tranquility in Armenia. During this period, Abas strengthened his positions and began to actively intervene in the political processes of Transcaucasia. Among the Chalcedonians, his main ally was the Georgian prince Gurgen, Abas's father-in-law. With Abas's support, Gurgen successfully withstood the pressures of the Kingdom of Abkhazia until 941, curbed the ambitions of the lords of Klarjeti, and contributed to the spread of Chalcedonianism in the Kingdom of Caucasian Albania. After Gurgen's death (941), Abas was forced to independently confront the combined forces of the Kingdom of Abkhazia and Klarjeti.

By the early 940s, Abas had already grown significantly stronger. According to the epistles of Catholicos Anania Mokatsi, during this period Abas's status was at least equal to that of Gagik Artsruni. In his encyclical of 941-942, the Catholicos addressed both of them:

...in this period of the Armenian year 390 (941-942)... in the days of the two brave, noble, and mighty autocrats, the Christ-crowned kings of Armenia, Lord Gagik Artsruni, King of Armenia, and Lord Abas Bagratuni, the peace-loving, gentle, mighty, and great King of Armenia.

While previously Gagik Artsruni was the primary figure for the Catholicos, over time, the primacy passed to Abas.

=== Territorial extent of the kingdom (929–942) ===
The first period of Abas's rule can be divided into two sub-phases: before the death of Ashot Shapuhyan and after it, when his lands in Arsharunik and Chakatk went to Abas. By 934, the transfer of Ashot Shapuhyan's domains to Abas had restored much of the Bagratuni territory that had been fragmented after the death of Smbat I.

Between 935 and 940, Abas ruled mostly over the Ayrarat province of Greater Armenia (except for the Tsaghkotn, Kogovit, and Masyatsotn cantons that belonged to Gagik Artsruni). His rule also included the eastern part of Tayk (up to Ukhtik-Olti), some cantons of Gugark (from Ardahan to the valley of the Aghstev river), the northwestern part of Utik, and the northern part of Syunik (Gegharkunik and Sotk).

Studies show that Abas also had power over several cantons in Turuberan. During the reign of King Smbat I, the cantons of Mardistan, Koro Dzor, Hark, Kajberunik, most of Apahunik, and the cities of Archesh, Artske, and Khlat were taken into the royal domain from the Kaysite emirs ruling in Turuberan. According to Constantine Porphyrogenitus, the cantons of Apahunik, Koro Dzor, and Hark, along with the cities of Khlat, Archesh, and Berkri, became independent after Smbat I's murder. In 939–940, they were still independent, although they were in the Byzantine zone of influence. But the northeastern cantons of Turuberan—Dasnavork, Tvaratsatap, Dalarin, and Varazhnunik (which lay between Mardaghi, Apahunik, Hark, and Bagrevand)—remained part of the central Bagratuni rule.

In the north, the border of the Bagratuni lands reached the Samshvilde fortress near Tiflis. In 920, Ashot, along with Abas, defeated Gurgen's army and took Samshvilde under their control. This situation continued during Abas's rule as well, and his lands stretched up to the Kura river in the Dzoraget and Aghstev region.

== Consolidation of the Bagratuni kingdom ==
=== Second phase of the reign (943–953) ===
During the first phase of Abas Bagratuni's reign (929–942), most of the Bagratuni domains were united, which contributed to the strengthening of the central power. In 934, the domains of Ashot Shapuhyan, who died without an heir, passed to Abas. After the death of Gagik Artsruni in 943, Abas became the sole king of Armenia. Gagik's son Derenik is mentioned by Catholicos Anania Mokatsi as the "King of Vaspurakan," while Abas is called the "King of Armenia", which confirms the restoration of the Bagratuni supremacy.

In 943, Abkhazian troops invaded Armenia with the aim of consecrating the newly built Church of the Holy Apostles in Kars according to the Chalcedonian rite. In the battle that took place near the Kura river, the army led by Abas defeated the Abkhazian troops, and the enemy's commander Ber was captured and blinded. The victory strengthened Abas's position in Transcaucasia and limited the spread of Chalcedonian influence in Armenia.

=== Ecclesiastical affairs ===
During the second period of Abas Bagratuni's reign, the spiritual-ecclesiastical issues of Armenia were settled. After the death of Gagik Artsruni, an opportunity arose to move the seat of the Catholicos to Ayrarat. According to the testimony of the chronicler Samuel Anetsi, Catholicos Anania Mokatsi resided at Aghtamar for 5 years and in Varag for 17 years. The Catholicos's seat was established not in the royal capital of Kars, but in Argina. The relocation of the spiritual center strengthened Abas's position.

In the second half of the 940s and the early 950s, with Abas's support, the issue of the "Albanian rebellion" that lasted 69 years was resolved. During the reign of the five Armenian catholicoi who ruled before Mokatsi's ordination (Mashtots I of Yeghvard, Hovhannes Draskhanakerttsi, Stepanos II of Rshtunik, Theodoros I of Rshtunik, Yeghishe I of Rshtunik), the Catholicoi of Caucasian Albania were ordained by local bishops, violating the accepted order of being ordained by the Armenian Catholicos. The beginning of this problem is attributed to 876/877, during the time of Gevorg II of Garni.

At the same time, Hakob, the Bishop of Syunik (918–958), refused to receive chrism from the Armenian Catholicos, turning instead to Sahak, the Catholicos of Albania (928–948). They opposed and did not participate in the election of the Armenian Catholicos. The conflict had political reasons: King Ishkhanak of Albania accepted Chalcedonianism, which endangered the spiritual and political unity of the Armenian people. To resolve the issue, in 946 Anania Mokatsi traveled to Syunik, where he met with princes Smbat of Syunik and Jvansher of Balk. Bishop Hakob temporarily repented but soon returned to his previous behavior. At Mokatsi's request, King Abas issued a special decree, banning marriages with diaphysites under the threat of the death penalty.

After the death of Sahak, the Catholicos of Albania, in 948, the local authorities did not want to accept his successor Gagik (948–961) and sent another candidate, Hunan, to Argina. With Abas's agreement, Hunan was anointed as the Catholicos of Albania by the Armenian Catholicos, as a result of which Hakob of Syunik lost his ally. In 949, during Anania Mokatsi's visits to Khachen and Syunik, a church council was convened in the town of Ardakh on the initiative of Prince Grigor of Khachen, with the participation of Gagik and Hunan. Since the majority of the council members favored Gagik's candidacy, Mokatsi defrocked them, and then ordained Gagik according to the legal order. Stepanos Orbelian noted that Catholicos Gagik later did not fully submit to the Armenian patriarch. After that, Mokatsi went to Syunik, where Bishop Hakob, with the support of Prince Jvansher, took refuge in the Kapan fortress. The Catholicos excommunicated them and, under the patronage of King Abas, destroyed Hakob's residence. Anania Mokatsi attributes the resolution of the church disputes to Abas's support.

Parallel to the stabilization of spiritual life, active church building began by the order of King Abas, in which miaphysite clergymen who were persecuted in Byzantium and found refuge in Armenia also participated. During this period, the monastic complexes of Kamrjadzor, Horomos, Dprevank, and others were built. The "small katoghike" church was built outside the Ani citadel, which initiated the territorial expansion of the city. Asoghik noted in his work that Abas became the "cause of peace and construction in the land of Armenia". His activities were also noted positively in Georgian sources.

=== Later reign ===
In the last years of Abas's reign, Byzantium significantly intensified its activities towards the city of Karin. In 949, the Byzantine army captured Karin. Immediately after the capture, King Smbat of Klarjeti, who had received the title of kouropalates from Byzantium, captured the Mastaton fortress near the city of Karin. In 951, the Kurdish Shaddadids established themselves in Dvin. These events did not prevent Abas from eliminating the threat coming from Atropatene. Among the Armenian princes paying tribute to the ruler of Atropatene, Marzuban ibn Muhammad, were also the sons of Smbat; of them, Abas was the only one still paying tribute. This lasted until the fall of Marzuban's rule, when he fell captive to enemies in 948 and was deprived of power until 953–954. This removed another major political opponent. In connection with the events of 953–954, Abas (son of Smbat) was mentioned as the King of Armenia. After Abas's death, his son Ashot III bore the title of "Shahanshah" inherited from his father. Abas is also described as having restored the title "Shahanshah of the Armenians and Georgians" associated with the reign of Ashot Yerkat, under which he held supremacy in Armenia and Transcaucasia.

=== Territory and political authority ===
In the second phase of Abas's reign (943–953), after the death of Gagik Artsruni, Abas first took over the Masyatsotn, Kogovit, and Tsaghkotn cantons of Ayrarat, which had been annexed to the Kingdom of Vaspurakan back in 914. He then regained the title of "Shahanshah" and supremacy over other kingdoms and principalities of Armenia. His authority extended over much of Armenia, including other local kingdoms and principalities, as well as neighboring Chalcedonian regions. Abas's state also included the Principality of Taron, which acted independently and had close relations with Byzantium, while maintaining ties with the central government at the same time. Various regions formed part of the administrative-political structure of Armenia during that period. Among these were Greater Armenia, Vaspurakan, Kogovit, Taron, Mokk, Andzevatsik, Syunik, Vayots Dzor, Khachen and the Sevordik, Parisos, and Goroz, as well as Kapan, Handan, and Baddayn. Many of these principalities were subordinate to the supreme king. Abas's supremacy was recognized especially in Syunik and the Eastern regions, which was also supported by the catholicosal authority with the king's backing.

== Reign length ==
Abas Bagratuni reigned for 24 years. The beginning of his reign is generally dated to 929, taking into account the death of his predecessor, Ashot, in the Armenian year 378 (929–930). Abas died in the year 402, which corresponds to 953. These chronological data are consistent with a reign of 929–953.

== Family ==
- Father: Smbat I of Armenia
- Mother: Hripsime
- Brothers:
1. Ashot II of Armenia
2. Mushegh (died in 924), his wife was the daughter of King Bagrat I of Abkhazia.
- Wife: An unnamed Bagratuni, daughter of Gurgen Bagratuni, the curopalates of Tayk.

Children:

1. Ashot III of Armenia
2. Mushegh I

== Sources ==
- Abu Dulaf (1955). Abū-Dulaf Mis'ar Ibn Muhalhil's Travels in Iran (circa A.D. 950). Cairo.
- Adontz, N. (2012). Works. Vol. 5. Yerevan.
- Aleksanyan, V. (2014). "On the Activities of Bishop Hakob I of Syunik (918–958)". Historical-Philological Journal (3): 195–208.
- Alishan, G. (1869). Memories of the Armenian Homeland. Vol. A. Venice.
- Anonymous Chronicler (1971). History of the Anonymous Chronicler. Yerevan.
- Artsruni, Tovma; Anonymous (2010). History of the House of Artsrunik. Matenagirk Hayots. Vol. 11. Antelias.
- Asoghik, Stepanos Taronetsi (2011). Universal History. Matenagirk Hayots. Vol. 15. Yerevan.
- Bartikyan, H. (1966). "The 101st and 139th Letters of the Patriarch of Constantinople Nicholas Mystikos Addressed to Hovhannes Draskhanakerttsi and King Smbat I". Historical-Philological Journal (4): 252.
- Canard, M. (1948). Les Hamdanides et l'Arménie. Algiers.
- Chamchyants, M. (1785). History of Armenia from the Beginning of the World to the Year 1784. Vol. 2. Venice.
- Constantine Porphyrogenitus (1970). Foreign Sources on Armenia and Armenians, 6, Byzantine Sources, B. Yerevan.
- Draskhanakerttsi, Hovhannes (2010). History of Armenia. Matenagirk Hayots. Vol. 11. Antelias.
- Foreign Sources on Armenia and Armenians, 11, Arab Sources, B. Yerevan. 1981.
- Foreign Sources about Armenia and Armenians, 16, Arab Sources, C. Yerevan. 2005.
- Gren, A. (1893). "The Bagratid Dynasty in Armenia". Journal of the Ministry of Public Education: 100.
- Grigoryan, G. (1983). The Feudal Principality of the Bagratunis of Taron in the 9th-10th Centuries. Yerevan.
- Hakobyan, T. (1966). The Kingdom of Syunik. Yerevan.
- Harutyunyan, H. (1959). Armenia in the 9th-11th Centuries. Yerevan.
- Harutyunyan, B. (2016). The Artsruni Princely Family in the History of Armenia. Yerevan.
- History of the Armenian People. Vol. 3. Yerevan. 1976.
- Ibn al-Athir (1987). Al-Kamil fi al-tarikh. Vol. 7. Beirut.
- Ibn Hawqal (1967). Liber imaginis terrae. Bibliotheca geographorum arabicorum. Vol. 2. Leiden.
- Ibn Zafir (1999). Akhbar al-duwal al-munqati'a. Vol. 1. Irbid.
- Kirakos, Gandzaketsi (1961). History of Armenia. Yerevan.
- Manucharyan, A. (2015). Epigraphy as Primary Sources for the Political History of Armenia (IX–XIV Centuries). Yerevan.
- Markwart, J. (1913). The Genealogy of the Armenian Bagratids. Vienna.
- Markwart, J. (1930). Südarmenien und die Tigrisquellen. Wien.
- Matevosyan, K. (1997). Ani: Church Life and Manuscript Heritage. Etchmiadzin.
- Matevosyan, K. (2010). Pages of the History of Ani-Shirak. Yerevan.
- Melikset-Bek, L. (1934). Georgian Sources on Armenia and Armenians. Vol. 1. Yerevan.
- Melikset-Bek, L. (1936). Georgian Sources about Armenia and Armenians. Vol. B. Yerevan.
- Minorsky, V. (1953). Studies in Caucasian History. London.
- Miskawayh (1921). The Concluding Portion of The Experiences of the Nation. Vol. 2. Translated by D. S. Margoliouth. Oxford.
- Mokatsi, Anania (2010). Epistles. Matenagirk Hayots. Vol. 11. Antelias.
- Movses Kaghankatvatsi (1983). History of the Caucasian Albanians. Yerevan.
- Orbelian, Stepanos (1910). History of the Sisakan Province. Tiflis.
- Ormanian, M. (1912). Azgapatum. Constantinople.
- Receueil des textes relatifs à l’émir Sayf al-Daula le Hamdanide. Beirut. 1934.
- Samuel Anetsi (2014). Chronicle. Yerevan.
- Colophon of the Sanahin Monastery (The Kotuk of Sanahin).
- Sumbat Davitis-dze (1979). History and Narrative of the Bagratids. Tbilisi.
- Ter-Ghevondyan, A. (1957). "The Chronology of the City of Dvin in the 9th-11th Centuries". Bulletin of Social Sciences (10): 92.
- Ter-Ghevondyan, A. (1962). "The 11th-12th Century Anonymous Source of Munajjim-Bashi about the Shaddadids of Dvin and Ganja". Banber Matenadarani (6): 75.
- Ter-Ghevondyan, A. (1976). The Arab Emirates in Bagratuni Armenia. Yerevan.
- Toramanian, T. (1948). Materials on the History of Armenian Architecture. Vol. 2. Yerevan.
- Tumanyan, B. (1964). "Calendrical Calculations". Teghekagir Hasarakakan Gitutyunneri (5): 55–60.
- Vardan Vardapet (2001). Compendium of History. Yerevan.
- Vardanyan, V. (1969). The Artsruni Kingdom of Vaspurakan in 908–1021. Yerevan.
- Yeghiazaryan, A. (2013). "The Process of the Formation of the Bagrationi Georgian Kingdom: Part Two". Vem (2): 50–56.
- Yeghiazaryan, A. (2014). "The Prince of Princes of Armenia during the Reign of the First Bagratuni Kings". Vem (1): 62–74.
- Yeghiazaryan, A. (2014). "The Era of Ashot Yerkat. Part One: The Problem of Preserving the Armenian Kingdom". Vem (4): 47–66.
- Yeghiazaryan, A. (2015). "The Era of Ashot Yerkat. Part Two: The Restoration of the Armenian Kingdom". Vem (1): 38.
- Yeghiazaryan, A. (2016). Ashot Yerkat: King of Armenia. Yerevan.
- Yeghiazaryan, A. (2011). The State of the Armenian Bagratunis (885–908). Yerevan.
- Yeremyan, S. (1971). "The Annexation of the Northwestern Regions of Armenia to Byzantium in the 11th Century". Lraber Hasarakakan Gitutyunneri (3): 6–7.
- Yuzbashyan, K. (1974). "The Unknown Addressee of Emperor Romanos Lekapenos". Lraber Hasarakakan Gitutyunneri (1): 36–37.

== Bibliography ==
- "Abas". Soviet Armenian Encyclopedia (in Armenian). Vol. 1. Yerevan. 1975. p. 15.
- Garsoïan, Nina (1997). "The Independent Kingdoms of Medieval Armenia". In Hovannisian, Richard G. (ed.). The Armenian People from Ancient to Modern Times. Vol. 1. New York: St. Martin's Press. pp. 143–185. ISBN 0-312-10169-4.
- Kurkjian, Vahan M. (1958). A History of Armenia. Armenian General Benevolent Union of America.

Preceded by Ashot II	King of Armenia (Bagratid Kingdom of Armenia); 928–953	Succeeded by Ashot III
