= Anchabadze =

Georgian and Abkhazian noble family

Anchabadze ანჩაბაძე
- Country: Georgia
- Cadet branches: Machabeli (possibly), Loo, Shat-Ipa, Chhotua, Chaabalyrhua

The House of Anchabadze (Abkhazian: Ачба; Georgian: ანჩაბაძე) is a Georgian–Abkhazian noble family and the oldest surviving noble house originating from Abkhazia, Georgia.

== History ==
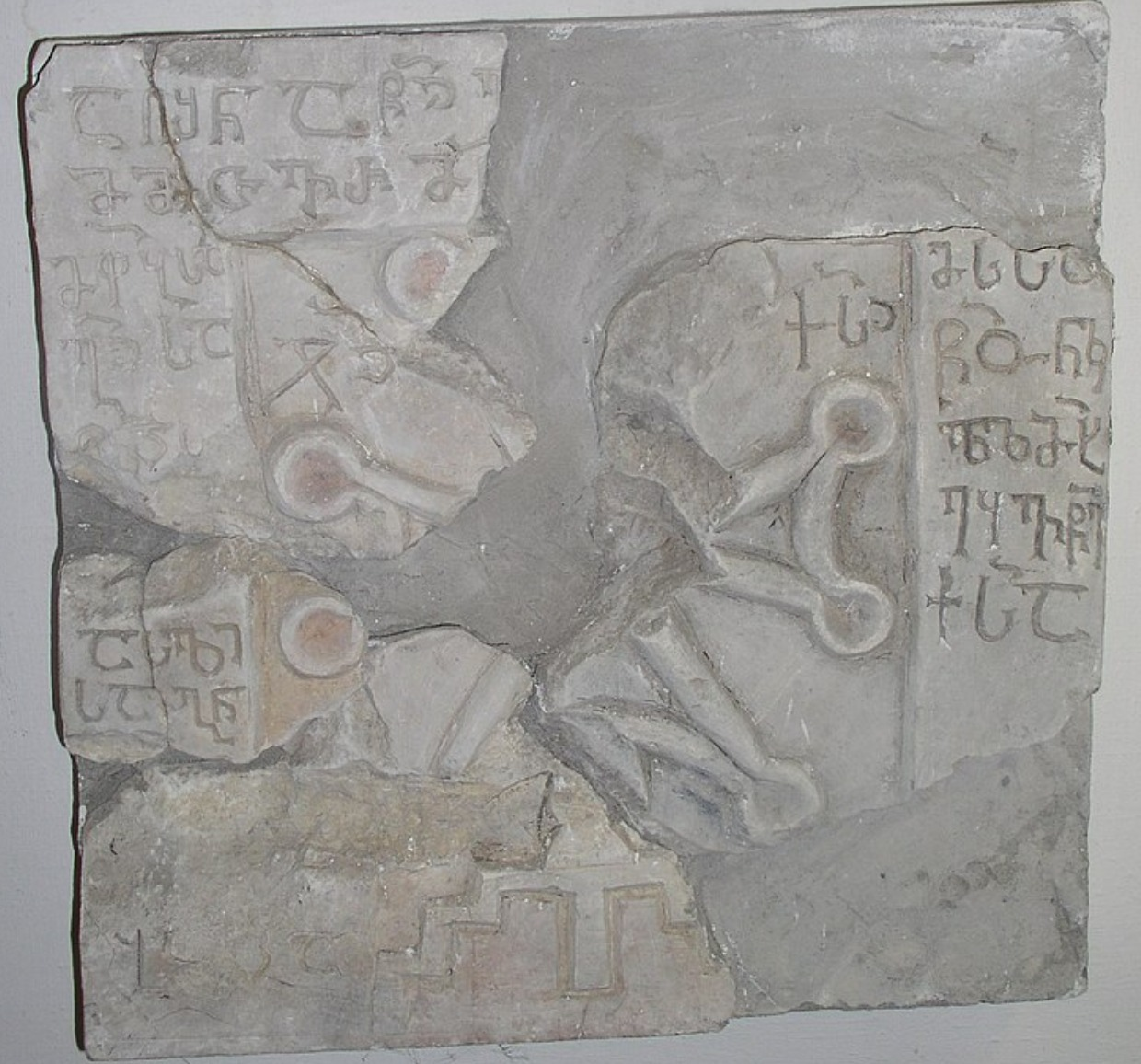
950s Church facade slab with a Georgian inscription in the Asomtavruli alphabet mentioning the king of Abkhazia George II Anchabadze and his daughter Gurandukht.

The Anchabadze family is supposed to have its roots in the early medieval ruling dynasty of Abasgia. According to a traditional account, after the break-up of the Kingdom of Georgia in the late 15th century, Abkhazia came under the influence of the Ottoman Empire and Islam, forcing several members of the family to flee to the eastern Georgian lands of Kartli and Kakheti. Thus, they formed two principal branches: the Abkhazian line of the princes Anchabadze and the Kartlian Machabeli. However, there is another version, according to which the Machabeli was an offshoot of the Tavkhelidze family, who adopted their dynastic name after the village of Achabeti on the Great Liakhvi River, where their initial domain was located. Both of these families were later integrated into the Imperial Russian princely nobility: Machabeli in 1826 and Anchabadze in 1903.

== Genealogy ==
- Kaytuk Giorgi Bey, married to Yelizaveta Hanım;
  - Islam Musa Bey, married to Ayşe Hanım;
    - Ahmed Rasim Pasha, married firstly to Fatma Neşedil Hanım, an Abkhazian, married secondly to Emine Vuslat Hanım;
      - Ahmed Refik Bey, married to Fatıma Hanım;
      - Mihri Hanım, married to Müşfik Selami Bey;
      - Enise Hanım, married to Salih Bey Asaf;
        - Hale Asaf;
      - Refik Hanım;
      - Ahmed Süheyil Bey;
        - Emel Nazan Hanım;
      - Ahmed Melih Bey;
        - Nezih Bey, married to Alexandra Sibylle Armgard;
      - Ahmed Selman Bey;
  - Ahmed Bey, married to Patıma Hanım Eşba;
    - Ahmed Sami Pasha, married to Fatıma Hanım Mamleeva, daughter of Ismail Bey Mamleeva;
      - Şükrü Bey, married firstly to Rabia Mümtaz Hanım, married secondly to Neşedil Hanım;
        - Ahmed Celal Bey, married firstly to Milnigar Hanım, married secondly to Louise Simon;
        - Adalet Pevizfelek Hanım;
      - Ayşe Mahizer Hanım;
      - Fatma Pesend Hanım married to Abdul Hamid II;
    - Ömer Pasha, married to Ayşe Kemalifer Hanım, second daughter of Mahmud Bey Dziapş-Ipa, and sister of Dürrünev Kadın;
      - Mehmed Refik Bey, married to Emine Maheşref Hanım, daughter of Osman Bey Eymhaa and Hesan Hanım Çaabalurhva;
        - Ahmed Bey, married to Esmehan Hanım Geçba, daughter of Eyüb Bey Geçba and Ayşe Gülten Hanım;
        - Rifat Kemaleddin Bey;
        - Emine Nurbanu Hidayet Hanım, married to Şehzade Mehmed Burhaneddin, son of Abdul Hamid II;
        - Leyla Gülefşan Hanım;
        - Feride Hanım, married to Hasan Bey Eymhaa;
      - Numan Bey;
      - Saide Hanım, married to Salih Bey;
      - Hürrem Hanım, married to Arif Bey Çaçba;
      - Esma Süreyya Cavidan Hanım, married to Şehzade Yusuf Izzeddin;
  - Mehmed Bey, married to Şadiye Hanım;
    - Behiye Nazmelek Hanım, married to Osman Pasha Zevş-Barakay, brother of Nesrin Neşerek Kadın, wife of Abdülaziz;
    - Azize Haletyar Hanım;
  - Saliha Verdicenan Kadın, married to Abdulmejid I;
  - Peremrüz Hanım;
  - Embruvaz Hanım, married to Adredba Bey;

== See also ==
- List of Georgian princely families

== Sources ==
- Açba, Harun (2007). Kadın efendiler: 1839-1924. Profil. ISBN 978-9-759-96109-1.
- Açba, Leyla (2004). Bir Çerkes prensesinin harem hatıraları. L & M. ISBN 978-9-756-49131-7.
- Tuna, Mahinur (2007). İlk Türk kadın ressam: Mihri Rasim (Müşfik) Açba : 1886 İstanbul-1954 New-York. As Yayın. ISBN 978-9-750-17250-2.
