= Principality of Kakheti =

Medieval Georgian principality

- 787–1010
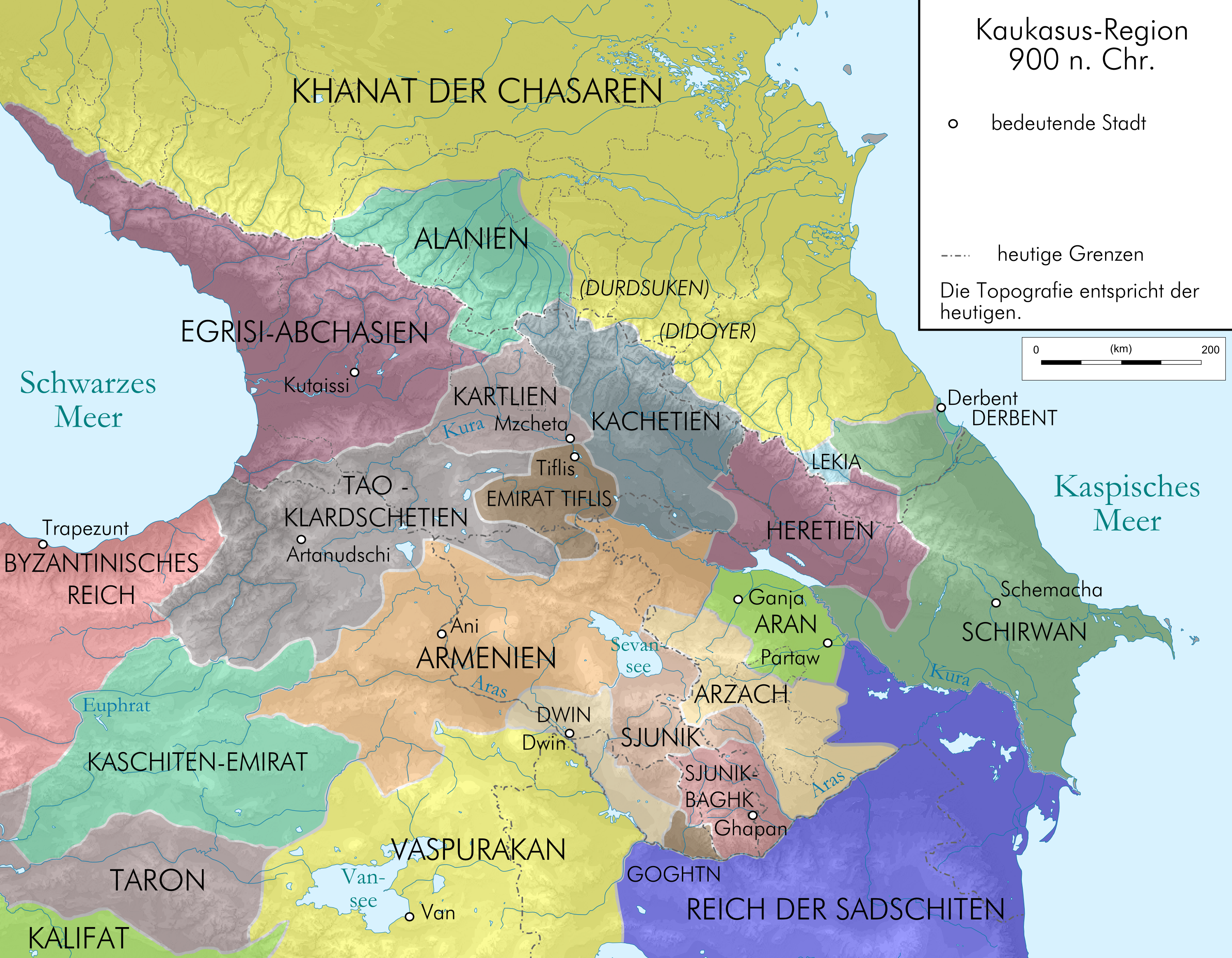
- Principality of Kakheti (German: Kachetien) around 900's AD
- Status: Theocratic principality
- Capital: Ujarma; Tianeti
- Common languages: Georgian
- Religion: Georgian Orthodox Church
- Government: Prince-Bishopric (Chorbishopric)
- Prince-Bishop
  - 787-827: Grigol (first)
  - 976-1010: David (last)
- History
  - Chorbishopric established: 787
  - United into the Kingdom of Kakheti-Hereti: 1010
Preceded by	Succeeded by
Principality of Iberia	Kingdom of Kakheti-Hereti
- Today part of: Georgia

The Principality of Kakheti (Georgian: კახეთის სამთავრო, romanized: k'akhetis samtavro), or Chorbishopric of Kakheti (Georgian: კახეთის საქორეპისკოპოსო, romanized: k'akhetis sakorep'isk'op'oso), was an early medieval Georgian principality in eastern Georgia, centered at the province of Kakheti. It emerged in the late 8th century during the weakening of the Arab rule in Georgia. Formed under the leadership of the prince-bishops of the Kakhetian mountains, the principality quickly established itself as one of the leading entities in the Caucasus. It struggled with other principalities to expand its influence, namely, eastwards it faced the emerging Kingdom of Hereti, while westwards it struggled with the Kingdom of the Iberians and Kingdom of Abkhazia over the control of Shida Kartli, the traditional cultural and religious center of Georgians, significantly weakened politically by the Arab domination. While the principality's efforts in the west eventually failed, with the Kingdom of Abkhazia and Kingdom of the Iberians firmly securing Shida Kartli and spearheading the unification of Georgia, in the west, Kakheti managed to absorb the Kingdom of Hereti and establish the unified Kingdom of Kakheti-Hereti, which lasted until the early 12th century when the Georgian King David IV finally incorporated it into the Georgian realm.

== History ==
=== Background and establishment ===
The principality of Kakheti was rooted in the historical communities of Kakheti, Kukheti and Gardabani. These communities emerged from the tribal societies formed on the ethno-political basis. These regions were part of Kingdom of Iberia and then Principality of Iberia. Kukheti was united with Kakheti in the Duchy of Kakheti during the reign of Pharnavaz I. Gardabani was part of Duchy of Khunan. This administrative division within Iberia was still in place by the 5th century AD, during reign of Vakhtang I.

The principality emerged from struggle against the Arab rule in Georgia. The long and unrelenting struggle against the Arab rule in the second half of the 7th century and the entire 8th century eventually weakened Iberia and their ruling dynasty. Iberia was punished the most by Arabs for disobidience, while Kakheti and especially its mountainous parts managed to avoid the devastation. This weakening of Iberia, coupled with the increasing instability in the Caliphate since 740s and economic prosperity in Kakheti, created the conditions for the rise of Kakheti and its separation from Iberia.

The struggle against the Arabs in Kakheti began from the mountains. The mountainous parts of Kakheti held out better during the Arab conquest than the lowlands, therefore, the attacks against the Arabs began from the mountainous areas in the direction of lowlands. The northern, mountainous parts assaulted the lowlands and conquered it. Moreover, due to devastation of lowlands, they were re-populated by peoples from the mountains. The political center of the emerging principality initially was Ujarma, but it soon lost its importance and the center moved to Tianeti in the mountains, which was advanced and well protected province at this point.

The highlander Tsanar tribe played the crucial rule in founding the principality. Tsanars lived in the Darial Gorge. Wooden mountain slopes in narrow gorges provided them advantageous defensive terrain, as the Arab cavalry found it difficult to fight there. Tsanars had an elected leader, so-called Khevisberi, who exercised both secular and clerical power. He was elected by several communities, khevis. After the Tsanars embraced Christianity, the Khevisberi assumed the Christian religious title. He exercised both secular and ecclesiastical authority. The princes in the lowlands of Kakheti and Gardabani supported Tsanars in their struggle against Arabs and sought protection from them. Thus, the archpriest of Tsanars became the great prince and other princes became his vassals.

Tsanars, Kakhetians and Gardabanians waged wars together against Arabs. The control of Darial Pass was especially important for Caliphate, because it provided an important road to North Caucasus, often served as a path for nomadic invaders, and was located on an important trade rout. Due to this, the Arab army waged many wars to subdue the Tsanars, like in 724 led by Al-Jarrah ibn Abdallah, in 727 led by Maslama ibn Abd al-Malik, and in 737 by Marwan II. The Marwan managed to conquer the Dariali Gorge, but in 758 the governor of Arminiya Yazid ibn Asid ibn Zafir al-Sulami had to conquer the region again and place cavalry in the gorge. In 770, the new governor Al-Hasan ibn Qahtaba also led a campaign against Tsanars. He was initially defeated, which forced the Caliph to send reinforcements, after which they crushed Tsanar rebellion. On the edge of 7th and 8th centuries, Tsanars managed to defeat Arabs led by governor Khuzayma ibn Khazim.

The first prince of Kakheti was Grigol, who ruled with the title of Chorepiscopus. Prince Vakhushti of Kartli links the separation of the Kakhetian principality from Iberia to the extinction of the ruling Chosroid dynasty of Iberia after the death of Prince Juansher. Grigol separated from the Principality of Iberia after the death of Juansher in 787. It is assumed that Grigol was from the Tsanar tribe. Due to the role of Tsanars in the establishment of the principality, it was sometimes referred to as "Tsanaria" in the early years. The territory of the principality included Kakhet-Kukhet-Gardabani during its foundation.

=== Early years and struggle against Arabs ===
After the unsuccessful rebellion of Iberian Prince Ashot against Arabs, he was forced to leave Kartli and settle in Klarjeti. Grigol of Kakheti used this opportunity and occupied Shida Kartli up to the river of Ksani. This led to the centuries-long struggle over the control of Kartli. Grigol's move led to King of Abkhazia Theodosius II and Ashot uniting their forces against him and forcing Grigol out of Kartli.

Situation in the Caucasus in 850s

During this time, the Emir of Tbilisi Mohammed Ibn Atab also tried to assert his independence from the Caliphate and revolted against Caliph, receiving the help of Tsanars. Although they managed to repulse the first Arab invasion, they were ultimately defeated in 829-830 by Caliph's army under the command of Khalid ibn Yazid al-Shaybani, who made Tsanars pay thousands of horses and lambs to Arabs as a tribute. During his second invasion, Khalid was confronted by an army of Gardabanians at Gavazi in 840-841 and defeated. In 842, Caliph sent the son of Khalid, Muhammad ibn Khalid al-Shaybani, who allied with Bagrat, Prince of Tao. They were confronted by Tbilisians and Gardabanians. The battle took place at Rekha, but ended inconclusively. In 853, the Caliph launched a large campaign against the Emir of Tbilisi Ishaq ibn Isma'il under the leadership of general Bugha al-Kabir. Tsanars, Gardabanians, and Kingdom of Abkhazia sided with Emire of Tbilisi in this conflict. Bugha captured and burned down Tbilisi, executing emir Ishaq ibn Isma'il. He also defeated Abkhazians, but was defeated by Tsanars. After this, despite the devastation brought by this invasion, Arabs never managed to fully reassert their rule in Georgia again.

=== Expansion ===
After the death of Grigol in 827, the throne was seized by Gardabanian nobles. Their Gardabanian heritage led to the principality often being referred to as "Gardabani" in the sources during their reign. The Chorepiscopus was still elected at this point, and Gardabanian nobles elected Vache of Kakheti. Eventually, throughout the 9th century, the title of Chorepiscopus became hereditary. In the 9th century, the principality was ruled by Donauri dynasty, while in the late 9th and entire 10th century, it was ruled by Arevmaneli dynasty.

In the late 9th century, the principality of Kakheti was involved in the defensive wars against Kingdom of Abkhazia. Also, Heretian Prince Grigor Hamam conquered parts of Kakheti. However, later Constantine III of Abkhazia and Kvirike I of Kakheti allied and raided Hereti, besieging Vejini fortress. Adarnase of Hereti asked for a truce and gave Orchobi to Kvirike, while Constantine received Arishi and Gavazni. The successor of Kvirike, Padla II of Kakheti assisted George II of Abkhazia in 925 during his struggle against his son Constantine, who was appointed as a ruler of Kartli by George but betrayed his father.

Kakheti continued to expand in the direction of Hereti, but this changed by the middle of the 10th century. In 914, the Kakheti and other Georgian principalities were invaded by Sajid Emir Yusuf ibn Abi'l-Saj. Although Kakheti managed to remain largely unaffected by this invasion as Kvirike I of Kakheti signed a truce, relinquishing Ujarma and Bochorma fortresses, the second Sajid invasion in 936 had devastating results. Even though Sajids failed to solidify their gains, the King of Hereti used the opportunity and reclaimed Heretian fortresses from Kakheti.

At the same time, the relations between Kakheti and Abkhazia broke down because of increasing expansionist ambitions of Abkhazia. Abkhazian king raided Kakheti during the reign of Kvirike II of Kakheti, exploiting the discord within the principality between the Arevmaneli prince and Gardabanian Donauri dukes. Brother of Kvirike II, Shurta betrayed him and handed over Ujarma to Abkhazian King in 959. The principality of Kakheti ultimately still managed to reclaim its lands, as after the death of George II a truce was signed between Kakhetians and Leon III of Abkhazia. After the death of Leon, Kakheti benefited from the instability in the Kingdom of Akbhazia and supported Theodosius III as a pretendent for the Abkhazian throne against his brother Demetrius III. Kakheti also expanded in the direction of Kartli, capturing Mukhrani, Kherki, Bazaleti and other fortresses. However, this time Kakhetians were confronted by Bagrationi princes of Tao-Klarjeti: David III of Tao and Bagrat III, a future king of Georgia.

=== Unification with Hereti ===
By the end of the 10th century, the Principality of Kakheti managed to recover from its defeats against Abkhazia and Hereti in the middle of the century. Kakhetian princes captured some fortresses in Kartli, and also expanded their rule to the Kingdom of Hereti. However, in 1008, Kakheti was confronted by Bagrat III, King of Georgia, who asked David of Kakheti to relinquish fortresses in Kartli. After Davit's refusal, Bagrat III invaded Kakheti and defeated Prince Davit. Bagrat also managed to capture Hereti during this campaign, installing Abulali as a governor. However, as soon as Bagrat left Hereti, Heretian nobles overthrew Abulali and invited David of Kakheti to rule over Hereti. In 1010, Bagrat again invaded Kakheti-Hereti and captivated Kvirike III of Kakheti. However, Bagrat's efforts did not last, because after his death in 1014, the Kakhetian and Heretian nobles managed to restore Kvirike III as the King of Kakheti-Hereti, with the Kingdom lasting until Georgian King David IV incorporated it into the Kingdom of Georgia in the 12th century. David of Kakheti was the last ruler of Kakheti to carry the title of chorbishop.

== Politics ==
The internal policy of prince-bishops was mostly aimed at strengthening princedom and administrative rule, as well as construction of new monasteries. In foreign policy, they were aimed at territorial expansion in the direction of Kartli and Hereti. They often fought for territories with the Princes of Tao-Klarjeti, Kings of Abkhazia and Princes and Kings of Hereti. In these struggles, Kakhetian princes often aligned with Emirs of Tbilisi, which led to them getting involved in Emir's wars against Arab Caliphate.

== Borders ==
The borders of the principality were different during its foundation and the late feudal era. Initially, the principality comprised Kakhet-Kukhet-Gardabani. It was bordered by the Principality of Hereti in the south-east. The border between them began near Khunan in the south and followed the valleys of Turdo, Shtori and Sameba. In the west, the principality was bordered by the Aragvi river and the Emirate of Tbilisi.

== Economy ==
In the early Middle Ages, Kakhet-Kukhet-Gardabani enjoyed significant economic prosperity. The lowlands, which were located south of Ujarma, had extensive viticulture, arable farming and gardening culture. The extensive irrigation systems were created in the valleys of Iori and Alazani rivers. In the northern, mountainous parts of the region, the stock raising developed, but it needed winter pastures in the plains. The highlander tribes like Tushs used the Caucasus Mountains as alpine pastures, while for winter pastures they used the plains around Iori and Alazani in the south, as well as the left bank of Mtkvari river. This created a strong economic interconnection between mountainous and lowland parts of the region. There were many trade routes going through Kakheti which created additional economic prosperity.

== Culture ==
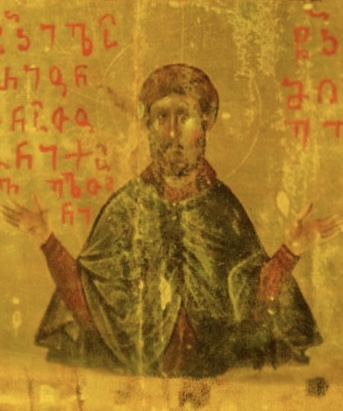
Hilarion on 14th century triptych at Saint Catherine's Monastery

The Georgian and Christian culture saw important developments under the principality of Kakheti. For example, in the 9th century, important Kakhetian church official, Hilarion the Iberian, founded many important monasteries in Kakheti, such as nunnery, Akura church, and others.

== Capital ==
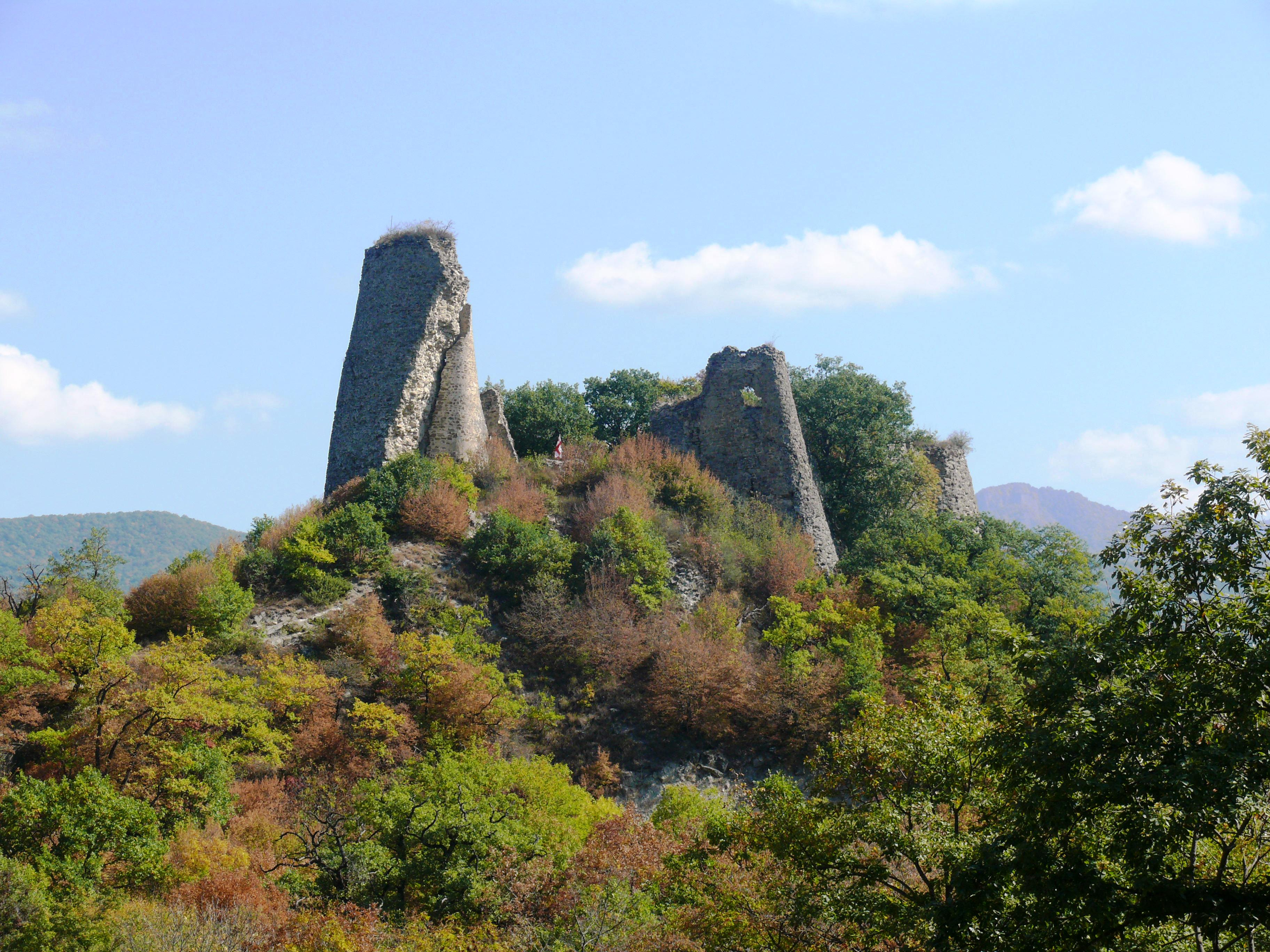
Ruins of Ujarma fortress.

Originally, the center of the principality was Ujarma, which was located at the border of Kakheti, Kukheti and Hereti, uniting mountainous and lowland regions. There was also an important trade route going through Ujarma. Later, the center moved to Tianeti in the northern part of principality.

== Population ==
Most of the population of the region was Kartvelian tribes: Kakhs, Kukhs and Gardabanians. In the north, on the slopes of the Caucasus lived both highlander Georgian and Vainakh tribes: Tushs, Pshavians, Pkhovs, Tsanars, Dzurdzuks, Gligvis.

== Princes of Kakheti ==
- 786–827 – Grigol
- 827–839 – Vache
- 839–861 – Samuel
- 861–881 – Gabriel
- 881–893 – Padla I
- 893–918 – Kvirike I
- 918–929 – Padla II
- 929–976 – Kvirike II
- 976–1010 – David

== Sources ==
- Lortkipanidze, Mariam (2006). საქართველოს ისტორია [History of Georgia] (PDF) (in Georgian). Vol. 1. Tbilisi: Publishing House of Tbilisi University. ISBN 9994012622.
- Asatiani, Nodar; Janelidze, Otar (2009). History of Georgia: From Ancient Times to the Present Day. Tbilisi: Publishing House Petite. ISBN 9789941906367.
- Meskhia, Shota (1973). საქართველოს ისტორიის ნარკვევები [Essays on the history of Georgia] (PDF). Vol. 2. Tbilisi: Publisher "Soviet Georgia".
- Rayfield, Donald (2012). Edge of Empires, a History of Georgia. London: Reaktion Books. ISBN 9781780230306.
