= List of monarchs of Kakheti and Hereti =

List of monarchs of Kakheti and Hereti contains heads of state associated with the various Caucasian political entities associated with the terms "Kakheti" and "Hereti" in modern-day Georgia, Turkey, Russia, Azerbaijan, and Armenia.

== Princes of Kakheti ==
=== The Chosroids ===
- c. 580–637 – Adarnase I, also prince of Iberia since 627.
- 637–650 – Stephen I, also prince of Iberia
- 650–684 – Adarnase II, prince of Iberia
- 685–736 – Stephen II
- 736–741 – Mirian
- 736–786 – Archil “the Martyr”
- 786–790 – John
- 786–807 – Juansher

=== Chorbishops ===
- 786–827 – Grigol
- 827–839 – Vache Kvabulidze
- 839–861 – Samuel, Donauri
- 861–881 – Gabriel, Donauri
- 881–893 – Padla I Arevmaneli
- 893–918 – Kvirike I
- 918–929 – Padla II
- 929–976 – Kvirike II
- 976–1010 – David
- 1010–1014 – Annexation by the Kingdom of Georgia
- 1014–1029 – Kvirike III
- 1029–1039 – Annexation by the Kingdom of Georgia

== Kings of Hereti ==
- Grigor Hamam (893–897)
- Adarnase (897–943)
- Ishkhanik (943–c. 965)
- John (c. 965-995)
- Queen Dinar (c. 1010s)

== Kings of Kakheti and Hereti ==
- 1039–1058 – Gagik
- 1058–1084 – Aghsartan I
- 1084–1102 – Kvirike IV
- 1102–1105 – Aghsartan II

== Kings of Kakheti ==
- 1465–1476 – George I
- 1476–1511 – Alexander I
- 1511–1513 – George II "the Bad"
- 1513–1520 – Annexation by the Kingdom of Kartli
- 1520–1574 – Levan
- 1574–1601 – Alexander II (Under the Ottoman suzerainty after 1578)
- 1601–1602 David I
- 1602–1605 – Alexander II (restored)
- 1605 – Constantine I
- 1606–1614 – Teimuraz I
- 1614–1615 – Direct Persian rule
- 1615–1615 – Teimuraz I (restored)
- 1616–1625 – Direct Persian rule
- 1625–1633 – Teimuraz I (restored)
- 1633–1633 – Direct Persian rule
- 1634–1648 – Teimuraz I (restored)
- 1648–1656 – Direct Persian rule (unified with Kartli)
- 1656–1664 – Direct Persian rule (detached from Kartli)
- 1664–1675 – Archil (Shāh Nazar Khān)
- 1675–1676 – Heraclius I (Nazar Alī Khān)
- 1676–1703 – Direct Persian rule
- 1703–1722 – David II (Imām Qulī Khān)
- 1722–1732 – Constantine II (Mahmūd Qulī Khān) (As vassal of Ottoman Empire)
- 1732–1744 – Teimuraz II (As vassal of Ottoman Empire until 1735, later one of Persia)
- 1744–1762 – Heraclius II
