= Kvirike I of Kakheti =

Prince of Kakheti from 893 to 918

Kvirike I კვირიკე I

Prince of Kakheti
- Reign: 893 – 918
- Predecessor: Padla I
- Successor: Padla II
- Dynasty: Arevmaneli
- Religion: Eastern Orthodox Church

Kvirike I (Georgian: კვირიკე I) (died 918) was a Prince and Chorepiscopus of Kakheti in eastern Georgia from 893 to 918.

He succeeded upon the death of Padla I of Kakheti, his possible father. In 914, he faced an Arab invasion led by Yusuf Ibn Abi'l-Saj who took hold of the fortresses of Ujarma and Bochorma, but the former was given back to Kvirike following his plead for peace. Next year, Kvirike forged an alliance with Constantine III of Abkhazia against his eastern neighbor Hereti, a principality in the Georgian-Albanian marchlands. The allies invaded Hereti and divided its major strongholds, with the Orchobi fortress being allotted to Kakheti. He was succeeded by his son, Padla II upon his death in 918.

Preceded by Padla I	Prince of Kakheti; 893–918	Succeeded by Padla II
