= Grigol of Kakheti =

Prince of Kakheti from 786 to 827

Grigol გრიგოლი

Prince of Kakheti
- Reign: 786 – 827
- Successor: Vache
- Dynasty: Unknown (Possibly Bagrationi)
- Religion: Eastern Orthodox Church

Grigol (Georgian: გრიგოლი) (died 827) was a Prince and Chorepiscopus of Kakheti in eastern Georgia from 786 to 827.

He seized control of Kakheti, Kukheti, and Gardabani following the demise of the Kakhetian branch of the Chosroid dynasty of Iberia during the Arab wars of conquest of the Caucasus. He adopted the title of "Chorepiscopus of Kakheti" and, aided by the Tsanars, Mtiuletians, and the Arab emir of Tiflis, invaded Inner Iberia (Shida Kartli), but was repulsed by Ashot I Kuropalates, a prince of the resurgent Bagratid dynasty, and Theodosius II of Abkhazia, east of the Ksani river.

He was succeeded by Vache Kvabulidze as chorepiscopus of Kakheti.

== Bibliography ==
- Toumanoff, Cyrille (1976, Rome). Manuel de Généalogie et de Chronologie pour le Caucase chrétien (Arménie, Géorgie, Albanie).
- Вахушти Багратиони. История царства грузинского. Возникновение и жизнь Кахети и Эрети. Ч.1.

| Preceded by Juansher | Prince of Kakheti; 786–827 | Succeeded by Vache |
