= Padla I of Kakheti =

Prince of Kakheti from 881 to 893

P'adla I ფადლა I

Prince of Kakheti
- Reign: 881 – 893
- Predecessor: Gabriel
- Successor: Kvirike I
- Died: 893
- Dynasty: Arevmaneli
- Religion: Eastern Orthodox Church

P'adla I (Georgian: ფადლა I) (died 893), of the Arevmaneli clan, was a Prince and chorepiscopus of Kakheti in eastern Georgia from 881 to 893. He attained to his office after suppressing the Donauri family, which had ruled Kakheti from 839 to 881. During his rule, Padla succeeded in recovering the district of Gardabani conquered by the Arab emir of Tiflis from his predecessor Gabriel.

== Bibliography ==
- Toumanoff, Cyrille (1976, Rome). Manuel de Généalogie et de Chronologie pour le Caucase chrétien (Arménie, Géorgie, Albanie).
- Вахушти Багратиони.

Preceded by Gabriel	Prince of Kakheti; 881–893	Succeeded by Kvirike I
