= Bochorma fortress =

Monument in Georgia

- ბოჭორმის ციხე
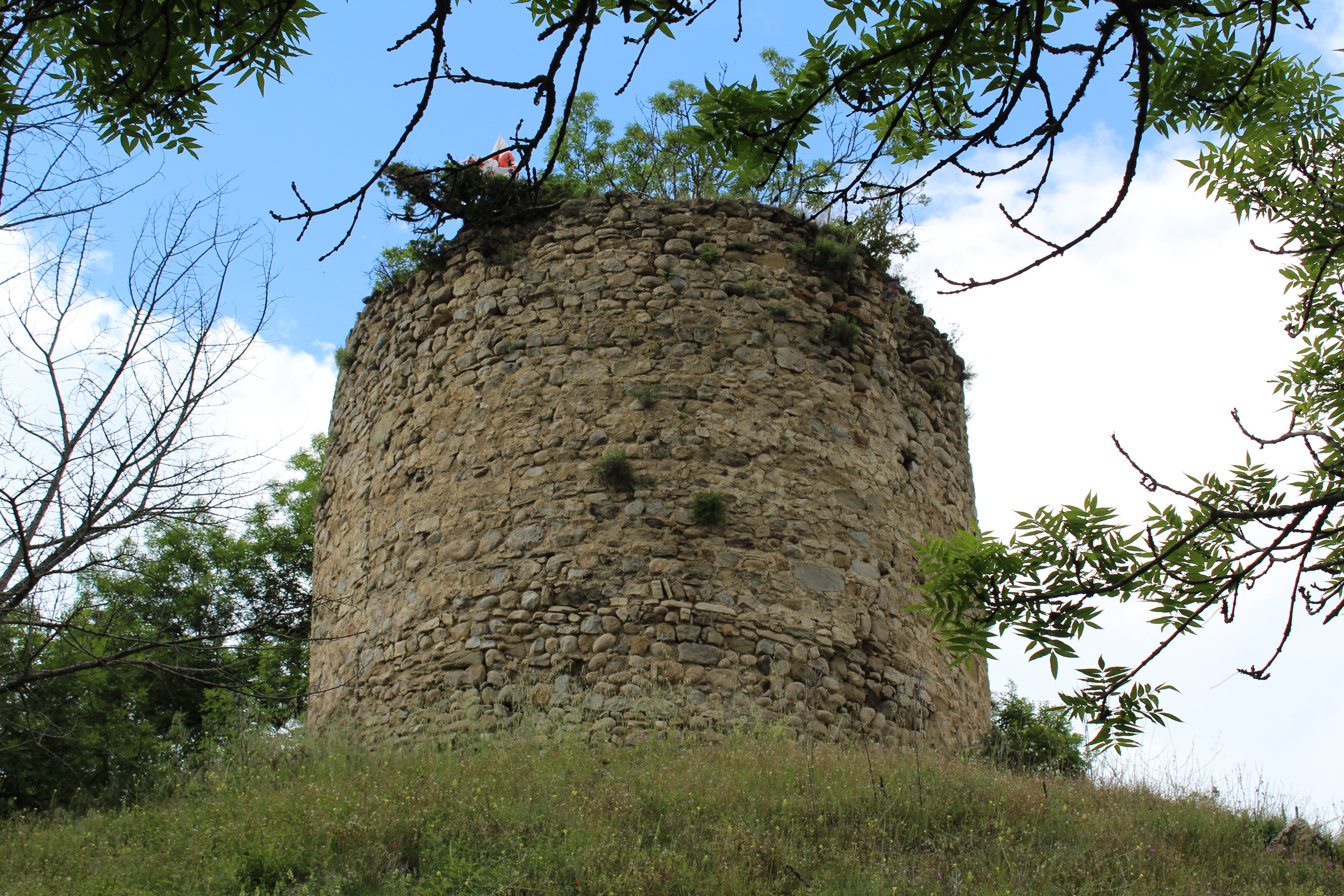
- Bochorma fortress
- Interactive map of Bochorma fortress
- Location: Bochorma, Tianeti Municipality, Mtskheta-Mtianeti, Georgia
- Coordinates: 41°54′32″N 45°08′56″E
- Type: Fortress, church

The Bochorma fortress (Georgian: ბოჭორმის ციხე, romanized: boch'ormis tsikhe) is a medieval architectural complex in eastern Georgia, located in the Tianeti Municipality in the region of Mtskheta-Mtianeti. Historically it was part of principality of Kakheti. Situated on a high mount on the Iori River, the complex consists of a castle and a domed dodecagonal church, both dated to the 10th century, as well as another small hall church, and some other accessory structures. All structures within the complex are half-ruined or significantly damaged. They are all inscribed on the list of the Immovable Cultural Monuments of National Significance.

== Architecture ==
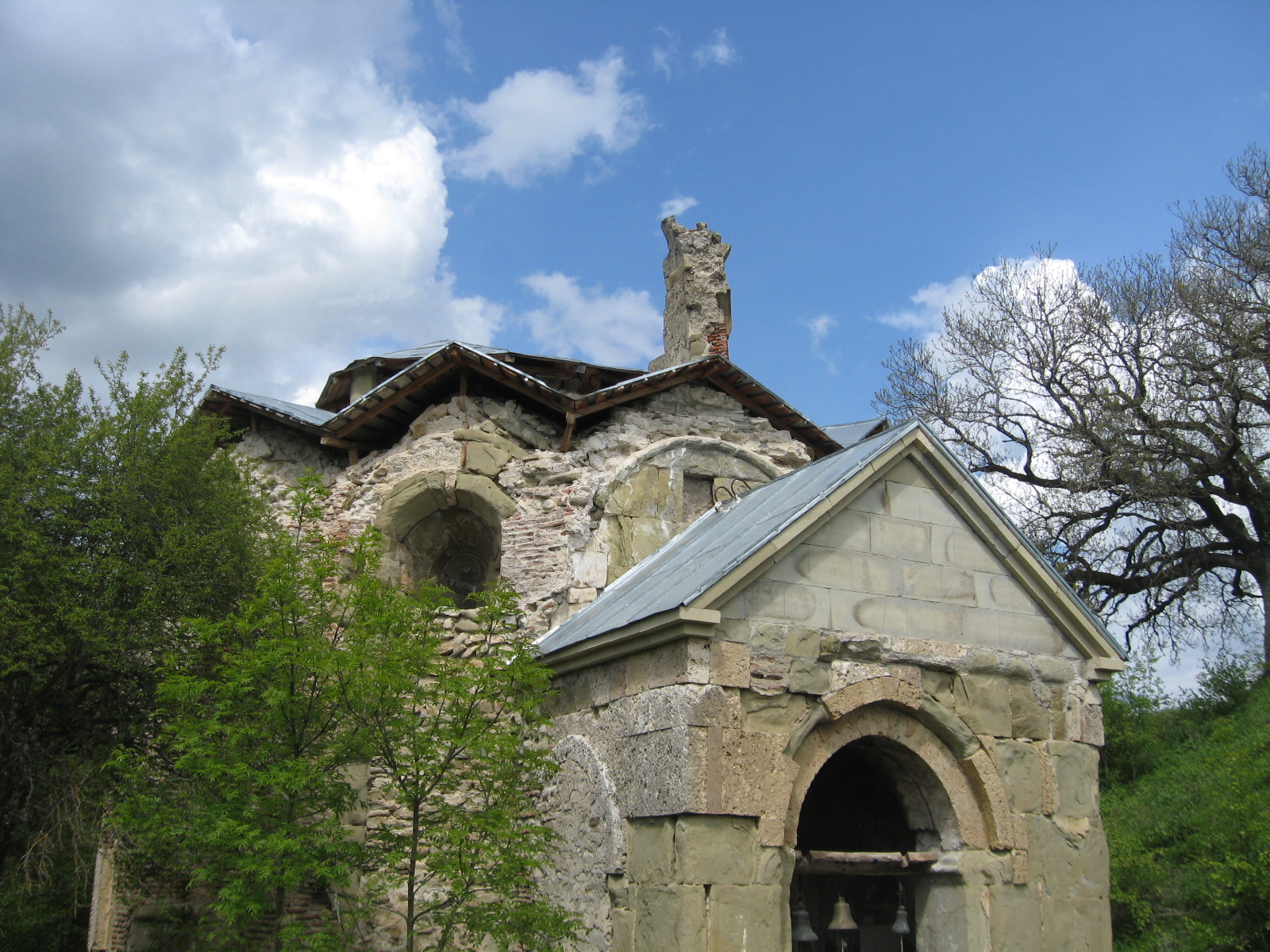
Bochorma church of St. George.

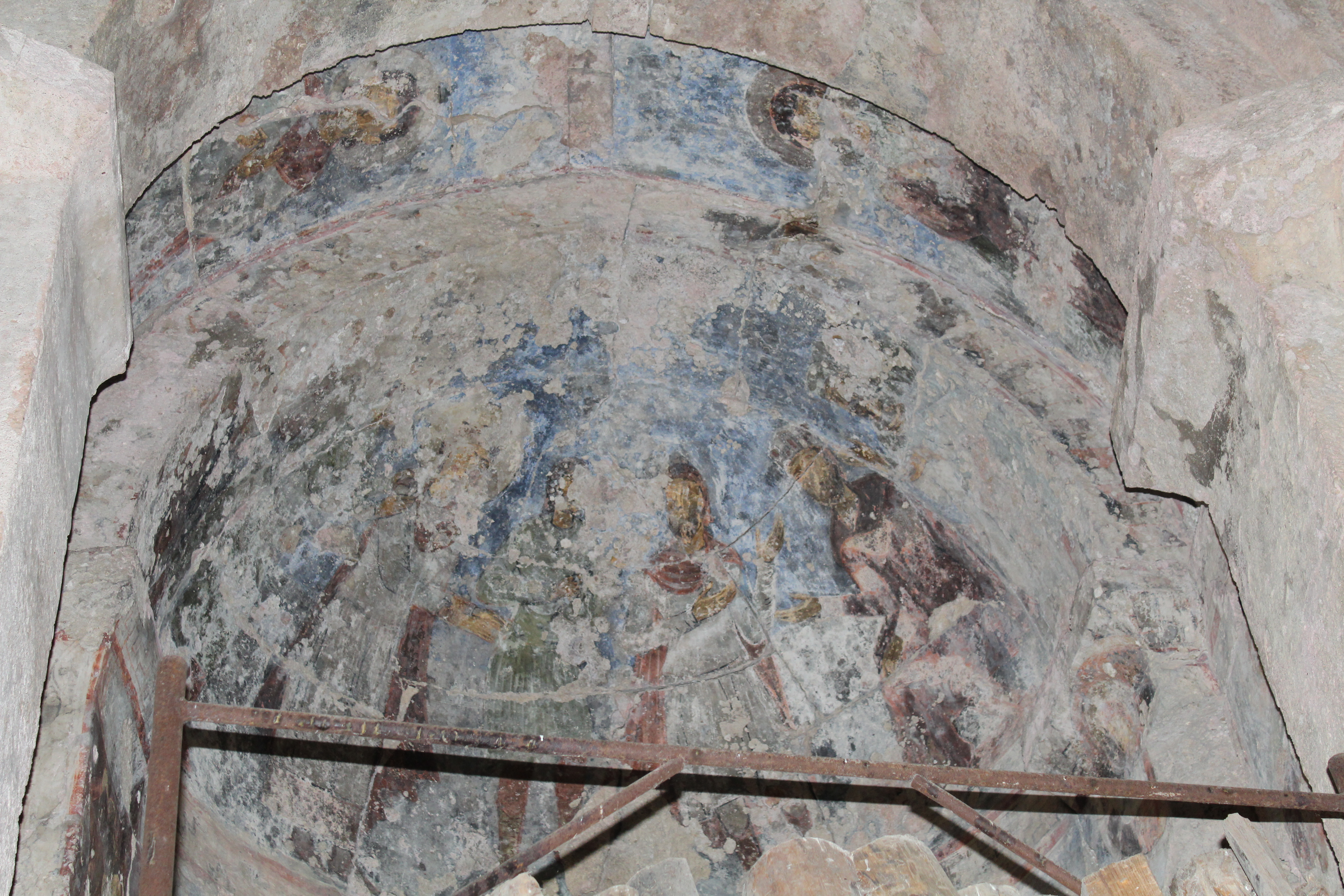
Frescoes in the church of St. George.

The Bochorma complex is located 2 km east of the modern village of Bochorma, on the left bank of the Iori, overlooking the river valley from a 300 m-high mountain ridge on the southwestern slopes of the Gombori Range. The fortress is relatively easily accessible from the east. Otherwise, its walls follow the ragged mountainous terrain, making most of the surrounding natural defenses. The fortress occupies the area of 1.5 ha. The inner part of the citadel stands on the irregular ground and is surrounded by a high curtain wall, with towers. The citadel contains the domed church of Saint George, a palace, a small hall church, a cylindrical tower, and some other accessory structures.

The church of Saint George is a hexaconch—a six-apse domed building—originally constructed in the 10th or 11th century and since then remodeled several times. Built of sandstone, both inner and outer walls were once faced with dressed stone slabs. The entrances are located in the southwestern and northwestern apses. The southwestern porch is topped by a belfry, which is a 17th-century annex. The altar apse is demarcated by an 18th-century brick iconostasis. The outer layout is dodecagonal, each facet covered by a pitched roof. The base of the dome, now in ruins, is pierced with six windows. The interior bears frescoes, which are, judging from the style of paintings, dated to the early 12th century and in a very poor state of preservation. These include scenes from the lives of Jesus and Saint George and portraits of various saints. In the lowest register of the northeastern conch of the church is a donor who is identified with King David IV of Georgia (r. 1089–1125). He stands next to an image of the Byzantine emperor Constantine the Great and his mother Helena. The iconography illustrates David's promotion of his status as a Christian monarch and a claim to symbolic succession to the Byzantine emperor in the region, which he had only acquired in 1104.

A nearby small church is a hall church design, with the dimensions of 4.7 × 3.7 m, built of cobblestone. It is a late medieval structure, with a semicircular apse and the southern doorway.

== History ==
The Bochorma fortress is first mentioned in the medieval Georgian chronicles in an account of the Sajid invasion of Georgia of 914. When the Sajid army advanced to Bochorma, then one of the principal strongholds of the principality of Kakheti, the fortress was abandoned without a fight, in contrast to the earlier steadfast defense of the Ujarma fortress. Later, Bochorma was seized by Shurta, an estranged brother of Kvirike II of Kakheti (r. 929–976), and turned by him over to George II of Abkhazia. The fortress was soon recovered by the Kakhetians, but they lost it to Bagrat III of Georgia in the war of 1008–1010. In 1069, Bagrat IV of Georgia bartered Bochorma and Ujarma away to Aghsartan I of Kakheti in exchange of the captive emir Fadl ibn Muhammad of Arran, whom Bagrat wanted to keep as his prisoner. The Bochorma fortress was functional well into the 18th century, being renovated by King Heraclius II in 1749.
