= Gabriel of Kakheti =

Prince of Kakheti from 861 to 881

Gabriel გაბრიელი

Prince of Kakheti
- Reign: 861 – 881
- Predecessor: Samuel
- Successor: Padla I
- Died: 881
- Dynasty: Donauri
- Religion: Eastern Orthodox Church

Gabriel (Georgian: გაბრიელი) (died 881), of the Donauri family, was a Prince and Chorepiscopus of Kakheti in eastern Georgia from 861 to 881. He succeeded on the death of his uncle Samuel. His reign was marked by the vigorous religious building spearheaded by the Kakhetian-born priest Illarion the Georgian (822–875). In contrast to his predecessor, Gabriel was at enmity with the Arab emir of Tiflis, Gabuloc' who dispossessed him of the district of Gardabani. He was succeeded by Padla I of the Arevmaneli clan.

== Bibliography ==
- Toumanoff, Cyrille (1976, Rome). Manuel de Généalogie et de Chronologie pour le Caucase chrétien (Arménie, Géorgie, Albanie).
- Вахушти Багратиони. История царства грузинского. Возникновение и жизнь Кахети и Эрети. Ч.1.

Preceded by Samuel	Prince of Kakheti; 861–881	Succeeded by Padla I
