= David of Kakheti =

Ruler of Kakheti from 976 to 1010

David

Chorepiscopus of Kakheti
- Reign: 976-1010
- Predecessor: Kvirike II
- Successor: Kvirike III
- Died: 1010
- Issue: Kvirike; Zolakertel
- Dynasty: Arevmaneli
- Father: Kvirike II

David of Kakheti was a Choreposcopus (or prince) of Kakheti, a principality in Eastern Georgia, who ruled from 976 until his death in 1010.

A member of the Arevmaneli dynasty that governed over Kakheti since the end of the 9th century, he reigned for 34 years at a time when Bagrationi prince Bagrat III was attempting to unify Georgian lands. In this context, he faced two Georgian invasions in 1008 and 1010. Defeated once, he was reestablished to his throne by a noble revolt, but only ruled for a short time before his death.

== Biography ==
David was the youngest son of Kvirike II, Chorepiscopus of Kakheti. His older brother Phadla died before 957, making him the heir to the throne of this Georgian Orthodox principality, at a time when the latter was in the midst of conflict with the neighboring Kingdom of Abkhazia. When King Leon III of Abkhazia, who controlled Georgian lands from the Black Sea to the border of Kakheti, acceded his throne in 957, he agreed to peace between the two states and gave his daughter to wed David.

The young princess gave birth to three children but died soon and that death led to a new war between Abkhazia and Kakheti. David would not remarry.

After his father's death in 976, David took over and became Chorepiscopus of Kakheti, a title with religious connotations but secularized over time to mean "hereditary prince". According to medieval chronicler Leontius of Ruisi, he reigned "wisely" for 34 years from the Dzveli Galavani ("Old Walls") Fortress in Telavi, maintaining an unstable peace with Abkhazia and sharing the region of Kartli with it.

In 1008, the ambitious Bagrat III, King of Abkhazia and ruler of Tao-Klarjeti, became King of Kartvelians, thus unifying the three most important titles of Georgia. Launching a campaign to unify Georgia, he sought to push David out of Kartli, threatening him with war unless he handed over his fortresses in central Georgia. David sent him a letter stating:

If you want these strongholds, the strength and fate of arms shall decide. For me, I await to meet you on the shores of the Ksani.

Bagrat III, at the helm of a powerful army of Abkhazians and Kartlians, crossed the bridge of Mtskheta and invaded Tianeti, at the north of Kakheti. David's forces were rapidly defeated, as he was forced to find refuge in Hereti, the easternmost province of Kakheti, while Bagrat III annexed the rest of his principality and appointing bureaucrat Abulal as local governor. The Georgian king continued his expedition towards Hereti and managed to submit the region.

The local nobility, in fear of the autocratic and centralized regime of Bagrat III, remained loyal to David and rebelled between 1009 and 1010, restoring David on the throne. However, the latter only governed Hereti, before dying in 1010. He left on his weakened throne his son Kvirike III, who continued his father's war before winning independence in 1014.

== Family ==
Prince David married around 957 a daughter of King Leon III of Abkhazia, who gave him three children:

- Kvirike, later King of Kakheti
- Zolakertel, wife of King David I Anhoghin
- a daughter, married to a prince of Marisili.

== Bibliography ==
- Brosset, Marie-Félicité (1849). Histoire de la Géorgie depuis l'Antiquité jusqu'au XIXe siècle. Volume I [History of Georgia from Ancient Times to the 19th Century, Volume 1] (in French). Saint-Petersburg: Imperial Academy of Sciences.
- Salia, Kalistrat (1980). Histoire de la nation géorgienne [History of the Georgian nation] (in French). Paris: Nino Salia.
- Asatiani, Nodar; Janelidze, Otar (2009). History of Georgia. Tbilisi: Publishing House Petite. ISBN 978-9941-9063-6-7.
- Brosset, Marie-Félicité (1856). Histoire de la Géorgie de l'Antiquité jusqu'au xixe siècle, " Histoire moderne " [History of Georgia from Ancient Times to the 19th Century, Modern History] (in French). Saint-Petersburg: Imperial Academy of Sciences.
- Toumanoff, Cyril (1990). Les dynasties de la Caucasie chrétienne de l'Antiquité jusqu'au xixe siècle : Tables généalogiques et chronologiques [Dynasties of Christian Caucasus, from Ancient Times to the 19th century: Genealogical and Chronological Tables] (in French). Rome.
