= Aghsartan II of Kakheti =

King of Kakheti and Hereti from 1102 to 1105

Aghsartan II აღსართან II

King of Kakheti and Hereti
- Reign: 1102 – 1105
- Predecessor: Kvirike IV
- Dynasty: Kvirikian
- Religion: Islam

Aghsartan II (Georgian: აღსართან II), was the last King of medieval Kakheti and Hereti in eastern Georgia from 1102 to 1105.

He succeeded upon the death of his father Kvirike IV. The medieval Georgian chroniclers characterize him as a frivolous man whose ignorant rule drew many great nobles into opposition. In 1105, Aghsartan was arrested by his vassals, the princes Arishiani of Hereti, and handed over to King David IV of Georgia who finally annexed the kingdom of Kakheti to the unified all-Georgian realm.

== Bibliography ==
- Toumanoff, Cyrille (1976, Rome). Manuel de Généalogie et de Chronologie pour le Caucase chrétien (Arménie, Géorgie, Albanie).
- Вахушти Багратиони. История царства грузинского. Возникновение и жизнь Кахети и Эрети. Ч.1.

Preceded by Kvirike IV	King of Kakheti and Hereti; 1102-1105	Succeeded by Annexation by the Kingdom of Georgia
