= Donaurov =

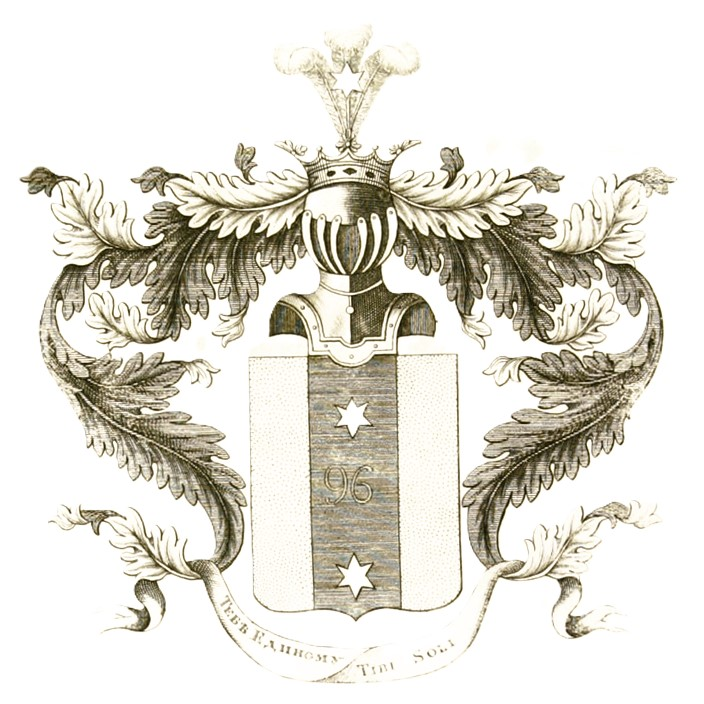
Coat of arms of the Donaurov family

The Donaurov family (Russian: Донауровы) was a Russian noble family, tracing their descent to the Georgia princely House of Donauri.

== History ==
In 1724, the founder of the Donaurov family followed the Georgian king Vakhtang VI into his Russian exile. His descendants were later established as untitled nobility in the governorates of Kazan and St. Petersburg. The Donaurov family produced several government officials, military officers, and cultural figures:

- Mikhail Ivanovich Donaurov (1758-1817), Actual Privy Counsellor and senator;
- Pyotr Mikhailovich Donaurov (1801-1863), Privy Counsellor and Governor of St. Petersburg (1851–55);
- Aleksandr Petrovich Donaurov (1840-1887), Actual Privy Counsellor;
- Ivan Mikhailovich Donaurov (died 1849), a popular composer of romances;
- Sergei Ivanovich Donaurov (1839-1897), also a composer of romances.
