= Kvirike IV of Kakheti =

King of Kakheti and Hereti from 1084 to 1102

Kvirike IV კვირიკე IV

King of Kakheti and Hereti
- Reign: 1084 – 1102
- Predecessor: Aghsartan I
- Successor: Aghsartan II
- Dynasty: Kvirikian
- Religion: Islam

Kvirike IV (Georgian: კვირიკე IV) (died 1102) was a King of Kakheti and Hereti in eastern Georgia from 1084 to 1102.

He succeeded upon the death of his father Aghsartan I. He ruled as a tributary to the Seljuq dynasty and opposed the energetic Georgian king David IV who pursued a vigorous domestic and foreign policy aimed at asserting Georgia's integrity and its hegemony in the Caucasus. Kvirike lost the fortress of Zedazeni to David, but was still able to secure the succession to his son Aghsartan II.

| Preceded by Aghsartan I | King of Kakheti and Hereti; 1084–1102 | Succeeded by Aghsartan II |
