= Battle of Partskhisi =

Battle in Georgia in 1070s

- Part of Georgian–Seljuk wars
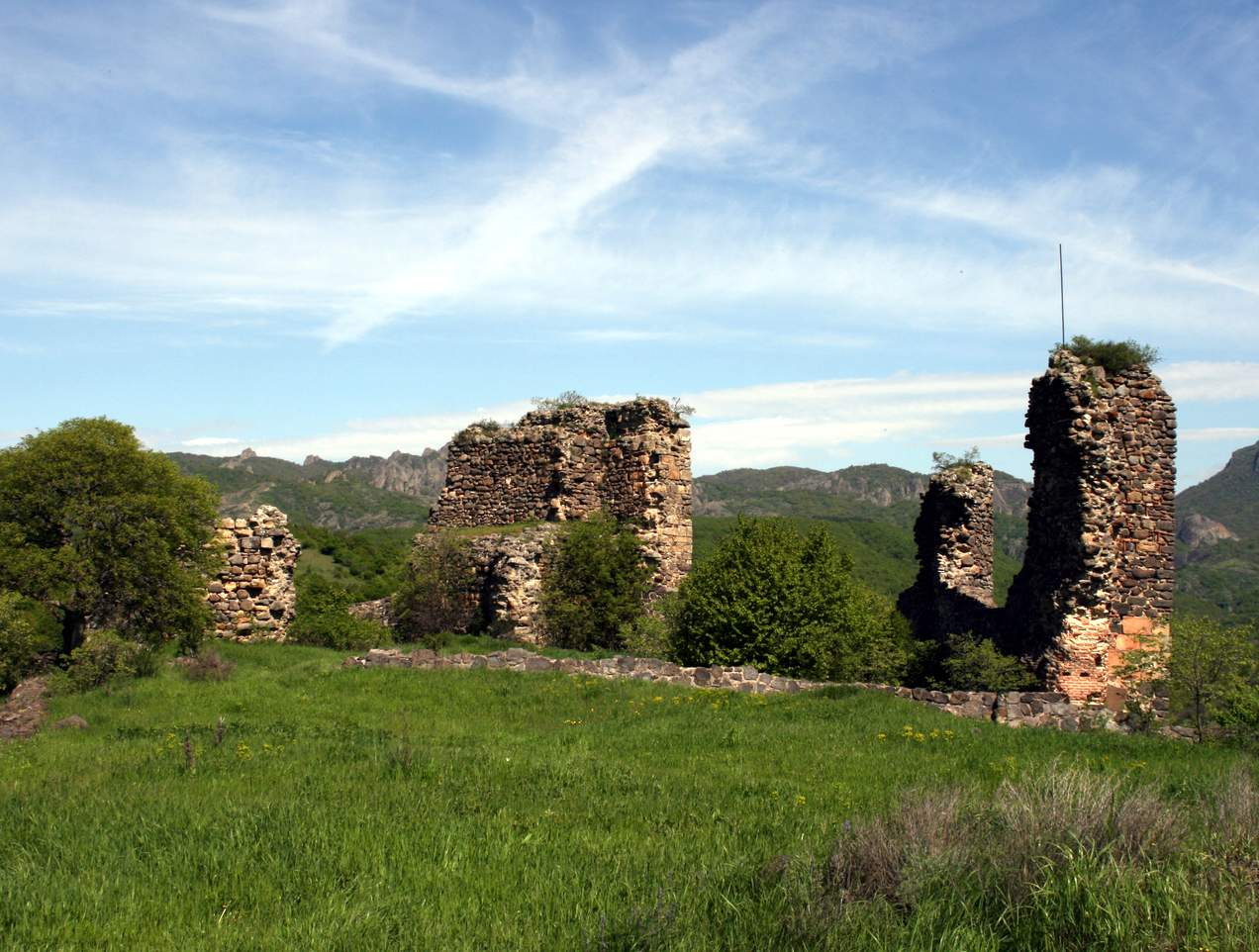
- The ruins of castle of Partskhisi.
Date	dated from 1072 to 1077 A.D.
Location	Partskhisi, Kingdom of Georgia 41°34′N 44°34′E
Result	Georgian victory

Belligerents
Kingdom of Georgia; Kingdom of Kakheti-Hereti	Seljuk Empire; Shaddadids

Commanders and leaders
George II; Aghsartan I	Sarang of Ganja (Savtegin)

Strength
25,000 men	48,000 men

Casualties and losses
Unknown	Unknown

The Battle of Partskhisi (Georgian: ფარცხისის ბრძოლა) was fought between the armies of Kingdom of Georgia and Seljuk Empire. After hours of intense fighting, Georgians won a decisive victory over the Turks.

== Background ==
After a brief campaign conducted by Malik-Shah I of Seljuk Empire in southern Georgia, the sultan handed the duchies of Samshvilde and Arran to a certain "Sarang of Gandza", referred to as Savthang in Arabic sources. Leaving 48,000 cavalrymen to Sarang, he ordered another campaign to bring Georgia fully under the dominion of Seljuk Empire. The ruler of Arran, aided by the Muslim rulers of Dmanisi, Dvin and Ganja marched his army into Georgia.

== Date ==
The dating of the invasion is disputed among modern Georgian scholars. While the battle is mostly dated in 1074 (Lortkipanidze, Berdzenishvili, Papaskiri), Prof. Ivane Javakhishvili puts the time somewhere around 1073 and 1074. 19th-century Georgian historian Tedo Jordania dates the battle in 1077. According to the latest research, the battle happened either in August or in September 1075 A.D.

== Battle ==
Giorgi II, with military support of Aghsartan I of Kakheti, met the invaders near the castle of Partskhisi. Although the details of the battle remain largely unstudied, it is known that one of the most powerful Georgian nobles, Ivane Baghuashi of Kldekari, allied to the Seljuks, handing them his son, Liparit, as a political prisoner as a pledge of loyalty. The battle raged on for an entire day, finally ending with a decisive victory for Giorgi II of Georgia. The momentum gained after the victory of an important battle fought in Partskhisi allowed the Georgians to recapture all the territories lost to the Seljuk Empire (Kars, Samshvilde) as well as the Byzantine Empire (Anacopia, Klarjeti, Shavsheti, Ardahan, Javakheti).
