= Basil of Khakhuli =

11th-century Georgian monk and saint

Saint Father Basil

Father Basil, jewel and enlightener of the Georgian Church
- Born: c. 981
- Died: c. 1040; Iviron monastery, Mount Athos
- Venerated in: Eastern Orthodox Church
- Feast: 27 May

Basil, son of Bagrat (Georgian: ბასილი ბაგრატის ძე, romanized: basili bagrat'is dze) was an 11th-century Georgian monk and man of letters in the Kingdom of Georgia, frequently identified as a son of King Bagrat III. He was active at the Khakhuli Monastery. He is a saint of the Georgian Orthodox Church.

== Primary sources ==
The surviving evidence on Basil's life is scarce and no work of his exists, but he is unanimously praised in the medieval and early modern Georgian sources for his contribution to the literary tradition of the Georgian church. The 11th-century Vitae of George the Hagiorite refers to Basil as "the Great" and "a tutor and enlightener of our country". He is also venerated in the 1027–1034 manuscript copied at the Khakhuli hermitage in Klarjeti, where Basil dwelt.

== Family background ==
The 18th-century Georgian scholar Catholicos Anton I was the first to surmise that Basil was "the son of a king" and Prince Ioann of Georgia, writing in 1813–28, made him a member of the Bagrationi dynasty. This led to his identification, first by Platon Ioseliani in 1853, as an otherwise unknown son of King Bagrat III. The hypothesis has not been universally accepted for the medieval Georgian sources know only Bagrat III's one son, George I, but it is maintained by the Georgian Soviet Encyclopedia and the Georgian Orthodox Church. According to the historian G. Goiladze, Basil may have been the same person as Gurgen, Bagrat III's son of his first marriage, unknown to the Georgian sources, but mentioned by the 18th-century Armenian author Mikayel Chamchian. He, thus, may have been born c. 981 and still been alive in 1040.

== Veneration ==
The available sources mention Basil as a pious monk, great philosopher and theologian, a skilled religious writer, and translator from the Greek. On this account, Basil has been canonized by the Georgian Orthodox Church, which commemorates him on 27 May (N.S. 9 June).
