= Padla II of Kakheti =

Prince of Kakheti from 918 to 929

P'adla II ფადლა II

Prince of Kakheti
- Reign: 918–929
- Predecessor: Kvirike I
- Successor: Kvirike II
- Dynasty: Arevmaneli
- Religion: Eastern Orthodox Church

P'adla II (Georgian: ფადლა II) (died 929 ) was a Prince and Chorepiscopus of Kakheti in eastern Georgia from 918 to 929.

He succeeded upon the death of his father, Kvirike I. His rule was marked by the Arab raids into Kakheti and Padla's involvement in the struggles and dynastic feuds in various Caucasian polities. Early in his reign he lost the fortress of Orchobi to the neighboring ruler Adarnase of Hereti who had ceded it to Padla's father. In 922, Padla aided King Ashot II of Armenia in crushing the revolt by prince Moses of Utik. Later in his reign, he also assisted George II of Abkhazia against his rebellious son Prince Constantine.

He was succeeded by his son Kvirike II.

== Bibliography ==
- Toumanoff, Cyrille (1976, Rome). Manuel de Généalogie et de Chronologie pour le Caucase chrétien (Arménie, Géorgie, Albanie).
- Вахушти Багратиони. История царства грузинского. Возникновение и жизнь Кахети и Эрети. Ч.1.

| Preceded by Kvirike I | Prince of Kakheti; 918–929 | Succeeded by Kvirike II |
