= Kvirike III of Kakheti =

King of Kakheti and Hereti from 1010 to 1037

Kvirike III the Great კვირიკე III დიდი
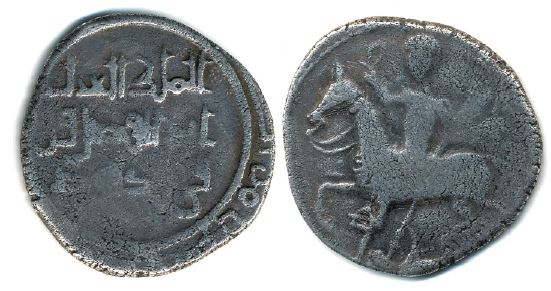
- Coin of Kvirike III, arabographycal type without Georgian letters.

King of Kakheti and Hereti
- Reign: 1010 – 1037
- Predecessor: David
- Successor: Gagik
- Died: 1037/39
- Dynasty: Arevmaneli
- Religion: Eastern Orthodox Church

Kvirike III the Great (Georgian: კვირიკე III დიდი, Kvirike III Didi) (died 1037/39) was a ruler of Kakheti and Hereti in eastern Georgia from 1010 (effectively from 1014) to 1037 or 1039.

== Reign ==
Kvirike succeeded upon the death of his father David as a prince and chorepiscopus of Kakheti, but the Bagratid king Bagrat III of Georgia captured him and conquered Kakheti. Following Bagrat's death in 1014, Kvirike was able to recover the crown, took control of the neighboring kingdom of Hereti and declared himself King of Kakheti and Hereti. He made Telavi his capital and constructed a palace at Bodoji near Tianeti. Under Kvirike III, the kingdom experienced a period of political power and prosperity. In 1027, Kvirike joined the combined armies of Bagrat IV of Georgia led by Liparit Orbeliani and Ivane Abazasdze, Emir Jaffar of Tiflis, and the Armenian King David I of Lorri against the Shaddadid emir of Arran, Fadhl II, who was decisively defeated at the Eklez River. Around 1029, Kvirike III defeated an invasion force led by the Alan king Urdure who had crossed the Caucasus Mountains into Kakheti and ravaged Tianeti. Urdure was killed in battle. At the zenith of his power and prestige, Kvirike was assassinated while hunting in 1037/39. According to the Georgian historian Vakhushti, this was done by Kvirike's Alan slave who sought to avenge for the death of King Urdure. On Kvirike’s death, Kakheti was temporarily annexed to the Kingdom of Georgia.

== Coins ==
Two series of silver coins of mixed Christian-Islamic design stuck under Kvirike III were found in 2012 and 2013 at Çuxur Qəbələ in Azerbaijan and Sisian in Armenia. The coins bear the name of Kvirike in Arabic (as Abu-l'Fadl Quriqi b. Da'ud), the Islamic symbol of faith (shahada), and the names of Abbasid caliphs — Al-Qadir (r. 991–1031) and Al-Qa'im (r. 1031–1075) — on the obverse, an indication of Kvirike's acceptance, at least nominally, of the Abbasid suzerainty as a means to fend off the Bagratid expansionism. The usage of Arabic script, common Arabic monetary protocol, and Muslim symbol of faith (shahada) on his coins did not mean Kvirike III's adherence to Islam. The reverse of the coins contains the image of a horseman identified in the Georgian asomtavruli letters as St. George defeating Diocletian, the earliest known monetary depictions of the saint.

Preceded by David	King of Kakheti and Hereti; 1010–1037/39	Succeeded by Gagik
