= Periodeutes =

A periodeutes (Greek: περιοδευτής, plural periodeutai, περιοδευταὶ), sometimes anglicized periodeut, was an itinerant priest in various Eastern Christian churches.

The fifty-seventh canon of the Fourth Council of Laodicea (380) prescribed that the chorepiskopoi (country bishops) should be replaced by periodeutai, that is, priests who have no fixed residence and act as organs of the city bishops.

In the Maronite Church, a periodeutes (bardūt) is "a kind of vicar forane who acts for the bishop in the inspection of the rural clergy."

In Syriac, the title is periodiota.
