= Gagik of Kakheti =

King of Kakheti and Hereti from 1039 to 1058

Gagik გაგიკი

King of Kakheti and Hereti
- Reign: 1039 – 1058
- Predecessor: Kvirike III
- Successor: Aghsartan
- Issue: Aghsartan I of Kakheti
- Dynasty: Kvirikian
- Father: David I Anhoghin
- Religion: Eastern Orthodox Church

Gagik (Georgian: გაგიკი) (died 1058) was a King of Kakheti and Hereti in eastern Georgia from 1039 to 1058.

== Life ==
He was a son of the Armenian Bagratid king David I of Lorri and his Georgian wife, sister of King Kvirike III of Kakheti who adopted Gagik as his son and heir. When Kvirike III died in 1029, King Bagrat IV of Georgia annexed Kakheti to his kingdom, but, in 1039, the Kakhetian nobility succeeded in restoring monarchy and installed Gagik as king. Through maneuvering between Bagrat IV and the powerful Georgian warlord Liparit Orbeliani Gagik managed to retain his crown and the integrity of his kingdom. He aided Bagrat in his expeditions against the Emirate of Tbilisi, but when the king of Georgia attempted to take Gagik's possessions in Hereti, Gagik allied himself with Liparit in the 1046-47 rebellion against Bagrat IV and achieved more or less stable control of his territories. He was succeeded by his son Aghsartan I.

== Bibliography ==
- Akopyan, Alexander; Vardanyan, Aram (2015). "A Contribution to Kiurikid Numismatics: Two Unique Coins of Gagik, King of Kakhet'i and of David II of Loři (Eleventh Century)". The Numismatic Chronicle. 175: 211–215. JSTOR 43859792.

Preceded by Kvirike III	King of Kakheti and Hereti; 1039–1058	Succeeded by Aghsartan I
