= Samuel of Kakheti =

Prince of Kakheti from 839 to 861

Samuel სამოელი

Prince of Kakheti
- Reign: 839 – 861
- Predecessor: Vache
- Successor: Gabriel
- Died: 861
- Dynasty: Donauri
- Religion: Eastern Orthodox Church

Samuel (Samoel; Georgian: სამოელი) (died 861), of the Donauri family, was a Prince and Chorepiscopus of Kakheti in eastern Georgia from 839 to 861. After the death of his predecessor Vache, Samuel was elected as prince by the Gardabanian nobility who dominated the politics of Kakheti at the time. He was allied with the Arab emir of Tiflis in the revolt against the Caliphate and hence Kakheti became targeted by the Arab punitive expeditions led by Khalid b. Yazid (840–42) and Bugha the Turk (853–54). Samuel was succeeded by his nephew, Gabriel.

== Bibliography ==
- Toumanoff, Cyrille (1976, Rome). Manuel de Généalogie et de Chronologie pour le Caucase chrétien (Arménie, Géorgie, Albanie).
- Вахушти Багратиони. История царства грузинского. Возникновение и жизнь Кахети и Эрети. Ч.1.

Preceded by Vache	Prince of Kakheti; 839–861	Succeeded by Gabriel
