= Aghsartan I of Kakheti =

King of Kakheti and Hereti from 1058 to 1084

Aghsartan I აღსართან I

King of Kakheti and Hereti
- Reign: 1058 – 1084
- Predecessor: Gagik
- Successor: Kvirike IV
- Dynasty: Kvirikian
- Father: Gagik of Kakheti
- Religion: Eastern Orthodox Church; Islam (later)

Aghsartan I (Georgian: აღსართან I; died 1084) was a King of Kakheti and Hereti in eastern Georgia from 1058 until his death in 1084.

== Life ==
He succeeded on the death of his father Gagik of Kakheti. His reign coincided with the Seljuk invasions in the Georgian lands and persistent attempts by the Georgian Bagratid kings to bring all Georgian polities into their unified realm. In 1068, Aghsartan submitted to the Seljuk sultan Alp Arslan, agreed to pay tribute, and secured the Turkish support against King Bagrat IV of Georgia who had seized part of the Kakhetian territory. He continued his struggle against the centralizing policy of the Georgian crown under Bagrat’s successor George II and allied himself with the rebellious Liparitid clan, but then transferred his loyalty to George and helped him counter the feudal opposition, and then fight the 1074 invasion by the Seljuk sultan Malik Shah I. However, when George II made peace with the sultan early in the 1080s, the latter recognized the king of Georgia as the only legitimate master of Kakheti and gave him a Seljuk force to conquer the region. George, at the head of a combined Georgian-Seljuk army, laid a siege to the Kakhetian fortress of Vezhini, but failed to take it and withdrew. Aghsartan immediately seized the opportunity to pledge his loyalty to the Seljuks, went to Malik Shah and embraced Islam, thus winning a Seljuk protection against the aspirations of the king of Georgia. He died in 1084, and was succeeded by his son Kvirike IV.

Preceded by Gagik	King of Kakheti and Hereti; 1058–1084	Succeeded by Kvirike IV
