= Kvirike II of Kakheti =

Prince of Kakheti from 929 to 976

Kvirike II კვირიკე II

Prince of Kakheti
- Reign: 929 – 976
- Predecessor: Padla II
- Successor: David
- Dynasty: Arevmaneli
- Religion: Eastern Orthodox Church

Kvirike II (Georgian: კვირიკე II) (died 976) was a Prince and Chorepiscopus of Kakheti in eastern Georgia from 929 to 976.

He succeeded upon the death of his father, Padla II.

== Long Reign ==
Most of his long reign was spent in a continuous struggle against the expansionism of the kings of Abkhazia who ruled over a significant portion of western and central Georgia and aimed at conquering Kakheti. Subversively aided by the rebellious Kakhetian nobles, George II of Abkhazia even succeeded in dispossessing Kvirike of his principality in the 930s. Kvirike II soon recovered the crown in 957 and successfully resisted the attempts of George's successor Leon III to gain a foothold in Kakheti. After Leon's death during one of his incursions into Kakheti II (969), Kvirike capitalized on the dynastic feud in the Kingdom of Abkhazia to reassert his full authority and even expand his possessions to the west.

In 976, Kvirike II invaded Kartli (central Georgia), captured the city of Uplistsikhe and took captive the Georgian Bagratid prince Bagrat who was intended by his powerful foster-father David III of Tao to seat on the thrones of Kartli and Abkhazia. In response, David marshaled an army to punish Kvirike and forced him to withdraw from Kartli and release Bagrat.

== Successor ==
He was succeeded by his son David.

== Bibliography ==
- Toumanoff, Cyrille (1976, Rome). Manuel de Généalogie et de Chronologie pour le Caucase chrétien (Arménie, Géorgie, Albanie).
- Вахушти Багратиони. История царства грузинского. Возникновение и жизнь Кахети и Эрети. Ч.1.

Preceded by Padla II	Prince of Kakheti; 929–976	Succeeded by David
