= Kukheti =

Kukheti კუხეთი
- Historical region
- Map highlighting the historical region of Kukheti
- Coordinates: 41°40′00″N 45°15′00″E
- Country: Georgia
- Mkhare: Shida Kartli; Kvemo Kartli; Samtskhe-Javakheti
- Capital: Tbilisi

Kukheti (Georgian: კუხეთი) was a historical region in eastern Georgia, founded by the Georgian ethnarch - Kukhos, son of Kartlos. Initially it was a part of Kartli. It borders with Hereti, Kakheti and Kartli. Later, on the basis of Kukheti, Kakheti and Hereti, one region was formed - called "Kakheti", which was no longer considered as part of "Kartli".

The mountain Gareja (2496 m) and David Gareji monastery complex were located in this province.

== See also ==
- Kakheti
