= Donauri =

Georgian noble family

The House of Donauri (Georgian: დონაური) was a Georgian noble family, the members of which included two ruling princes of the eastern province of Kakheti in the ninth century, and which gave origin to the latter-day noble family of Vachnadze, and, possibly, to the Babadishvili (Beburishvili) family. They are also considered ancestors of the Russian Donaurov family.

== History ==
According to medieval Georgian chronicles, the Donauri family originated in the district of Gardabani and rose to virtual independence as the princes of Kakheti with the title of k'orepiskoposi (a title adapted from the Greek chorepiscopus, normally a rural bishop). The two princes of the Donauri family were: Samuel (r. 839–861) and Gabriel (r. 861–881).

== See also ==
- Donaurov
