= Bagrat III of Georgia =

King of Georgia from 1008 to 1014

Bagrat III
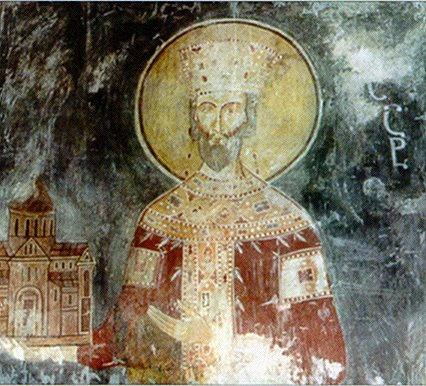
- Bagrat III, fresco from the Bedia Cathedral.

King of Georgia
- Reign: 1008–1014
- Successor: George I

King of Abkhazia
- Reign: 978–1008
- Predecessor: Theodosius III
- Successor: Annexed by the Kingdom of Georgia

Eristavi of the Saeristavo of Kartli
- Reign: 975–978
- Predecessor: Ioane Marushisdze
- Successor: Gurandukht
- Co-ruler: Gurgen
- Born: c. 963
- Died: 7 May 1014 (aged 50–51); Panaskerti, Tao
- Burial: Bedia Cathedral
- Spouse: Martha
- Issue: George I of Georgia; Basil of Khakhuli
- Dynasty: Bagrationi
- Father: Gurgen of Iberia
- Mother: Gurandukht of Abkhazia
- Religion: Georgian Orthodox Church

Bagrat III (Georgian: ბაგრატ III; c. 963 – 7 May 1014), also known as Bagrat the Unifier, of the Bagrationi dynasty, was the king (mepe) of the Kingdom of Abkhazia from 978 (as Bagrat II of Abkhazia) and king of the Kingdom of Georgia from 1008 until his death in 1014. Through dynastic inheritance, military conquest, and diplomatic efforts, he successfully united these realms, effectively founding the Kingdom of Georgia. Prior to his coronation as king, Bagrat III also ruled in the Saeristavo of Kartli as co-ruler with his father, Gurgen of Iberia, from 976 to 978.

== Early life and rule in Kartli ==
=== Youth ===
Bagrat the only known son of King Gurgen of Iberia and Gurandukht, daughter of King George II of Abkhazia. As a child, Bagrat was adopted and designated heir by his father’s cousin, David III Kuropalates, ruler of Upper Tao and holder of the Byzantine title of Kouropalates of Iberia since 966. David raised and educated him at his court.

During this period, Iberia was under the domination of the Kingdom of Abkhazia. In 780, Abkhazia, having resisted the Arab invasions, declared independence from Byzantine suzerainty and developed into a regional power. By 916, it had reached the height of its influence, invading Iberia and threatening Armenia. The kingdom’s power, however, began to decline under King Theodosius III of Abkhazia, known as the Blind, who ascended the throne in 975. A maternal uncle of Bagrat, Theodosius became embroiled in conflict with the nobility, leading to civil war in Abkhazia.

The instability encouraged Kvirike II of Kakheti, to launch incursions into Iberia. Within a short time, he had occupied much of eastern Georgia. Opposition soon arose under the eristavi (duke) of Kartli, Ioane Marushisdze, who turned to David Kuropalates for help. In 976, David intervened, defeated the Kakhetians, and expelled them from Iberia. Following this victory, he installed Bagrat as ruler, placing him under the regency of his father while presenting him with a realm largely freed from external overlordship.

=== Reign in Iberia ===
The first phase of Bagrat III’s rule in Iberia was brief and is poorly documented. Soon after his accession, the nobility, who had taken advantage of the political instability in Georgia to reassert their former power, began to rise in rebellion.

In 978, the nobles allied themselves with the new prince of Kakheti, David. He seized the fortress of Uplistsikhe and took the young Bagrat III and his parents hostage. Upon hearing of the situation, David III Kuropalates launched a campaign against Kakheti. Following negotiations, Iberia was restored to the royal family, although the Kakhetians retained control of the fortresses of Gruvi and Tsirkvali. From this point, the regency of the kingdom was assumed by Queen Gurandukht, Bagrat’s mother.

== Accession and reign in Abkhazia ==
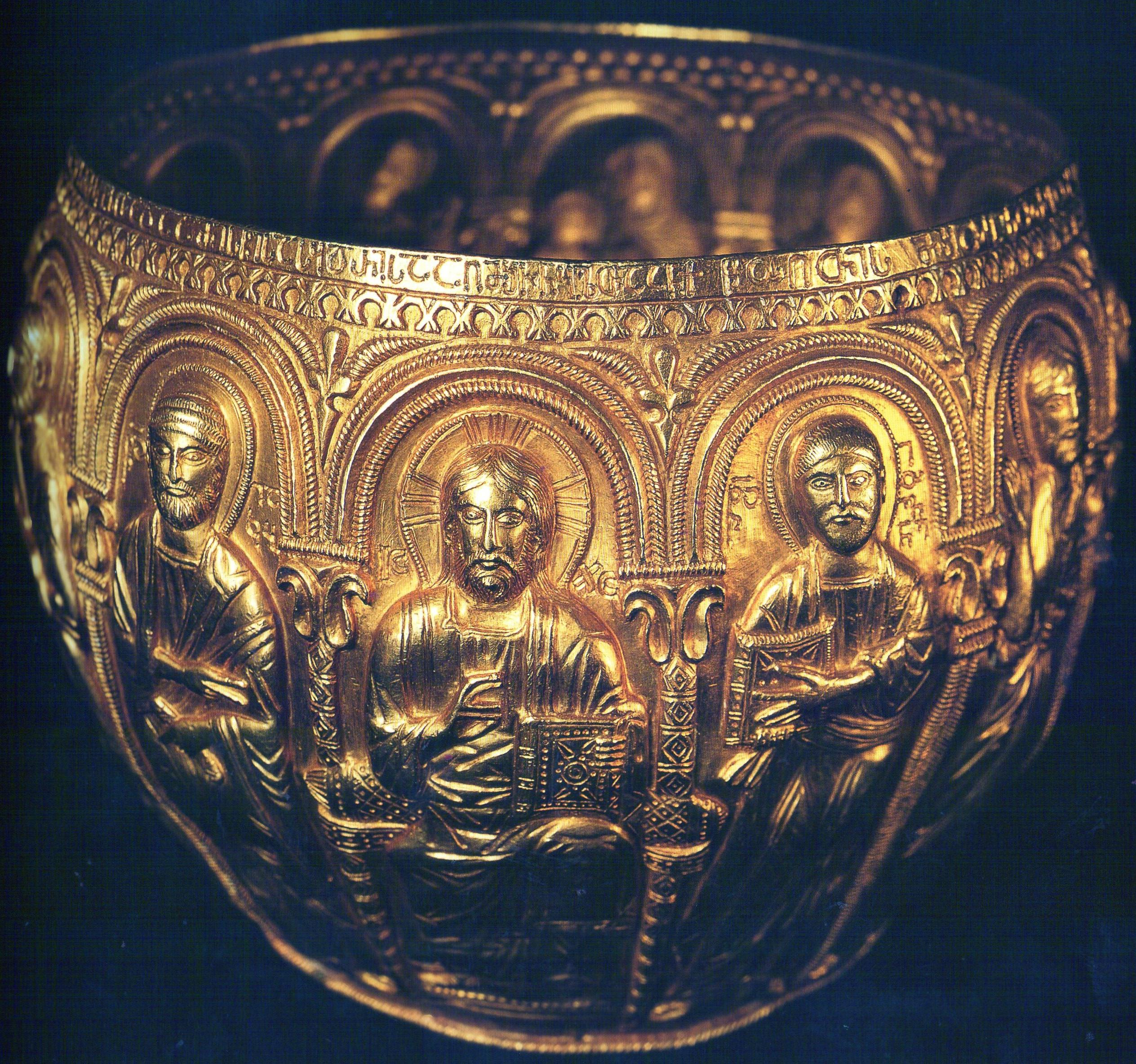
The Bedia Chalice donated by Bagrat to the Bedia Monastery is an important piece of Georgian metal art. c. 999 AD

Meanwhile, in Abkhazia, the weakness of King Theodosius III in dealing with the nobility further undermined the kingdom. Taking advantage of the situation, Ioane Marushisdze—who had already installed Bagrat on the Iberian throne—sought to elevate his protégé to the Abkhazian crown. The eristavi allied with the nobility of both Iberia and Abkhazia, who agreed that a strong monarch was needed to unify the two realms. Bagrat III was invested with the royal insignia and, having reached maturity, received the homage of the assembled nobles. This event is generally dated to 978, though some sources place it two years later. Bagrat, now ruler of western and central Georgia, sent the deposed Theodosius III the Blind to his adoptive father, David III Kuropalates.

Having become King of Abkhazia, Bagrat was soon compelled to return to Kartli, where his mother, the regent Gurandukht, attempted to assert independence. The Kartlian nobility, content under her regency, refused to recognize Bagrat as king of Iberia and rallied behind a nobleman named Kavtar Tbeli. The rebels fortified positions across central Georgia, but Bagrat defeated them in battle at Moghri. He advanced into his own kingdom, seized Uplistsikhe from his mother, and suppressed the aristocratic uprising. Having restored his authority, Bagrat returned to Abkhazia, where he placed his mother under supervision. He then turned to consolidating royal power, pacifying the nobility, and presenting himself as a loyal and just monarch.

=== Civil War ===
A few years later, before 994, a powerful nobleman of Iberia named Rati, son of Liparit and duke of Kldekari, emerged as a significant figure in the eastern part of Bagrat III’s realm. Rati soon gained control over the lordship of “Atheni”, as well as territories in southern Kartli (south of the Mtkvari River), the region of Trialeti, the valley of Manglisi, and Skoreti. He then refused to submit to Bagrat III.

In response, Bagrat advanced with a strong army, reinforced by the militia of his father Gurgen. However, fearing Bagrat’s growing power, his adoptive father David III Kuropalates allied with Bagrat Regueni, the father of Gurgen, as well as the Armenian monarchs Smbat II of Armenia and Abas I of Kars, in order to check Bagrat’s campaign.

The first battle took place on the plains of Gardatkhinlni, at the entrance to Shavsheti. The forces of Gurgen were defeated, and he was forced to take refuge in the fortress of Tsepti. Bagrat, who had suspended his campaign against Rati, realized he lacked the strength to confront the combined armies of David Kuropalates and Bagrat Regueni. He therefore entered into negotiations, which resulted in peace and the conclusion of what became known as the “family war.”

Bagrat III returned to Abkhazia, where he reigned peacefully for a time, while Rati was allowed to recover his domains. The king’s strategy, however, was to lull Rati into a false sense of security. During the following winter, Bagrat mustered his troops and laid siege to Kldekari, ultimately defeating the rebellious duke. Rati was pardoned and appointed duke of Argveti in western Georgia.

== Unification and King of Georgia ==
=== Unification of Georgia ===
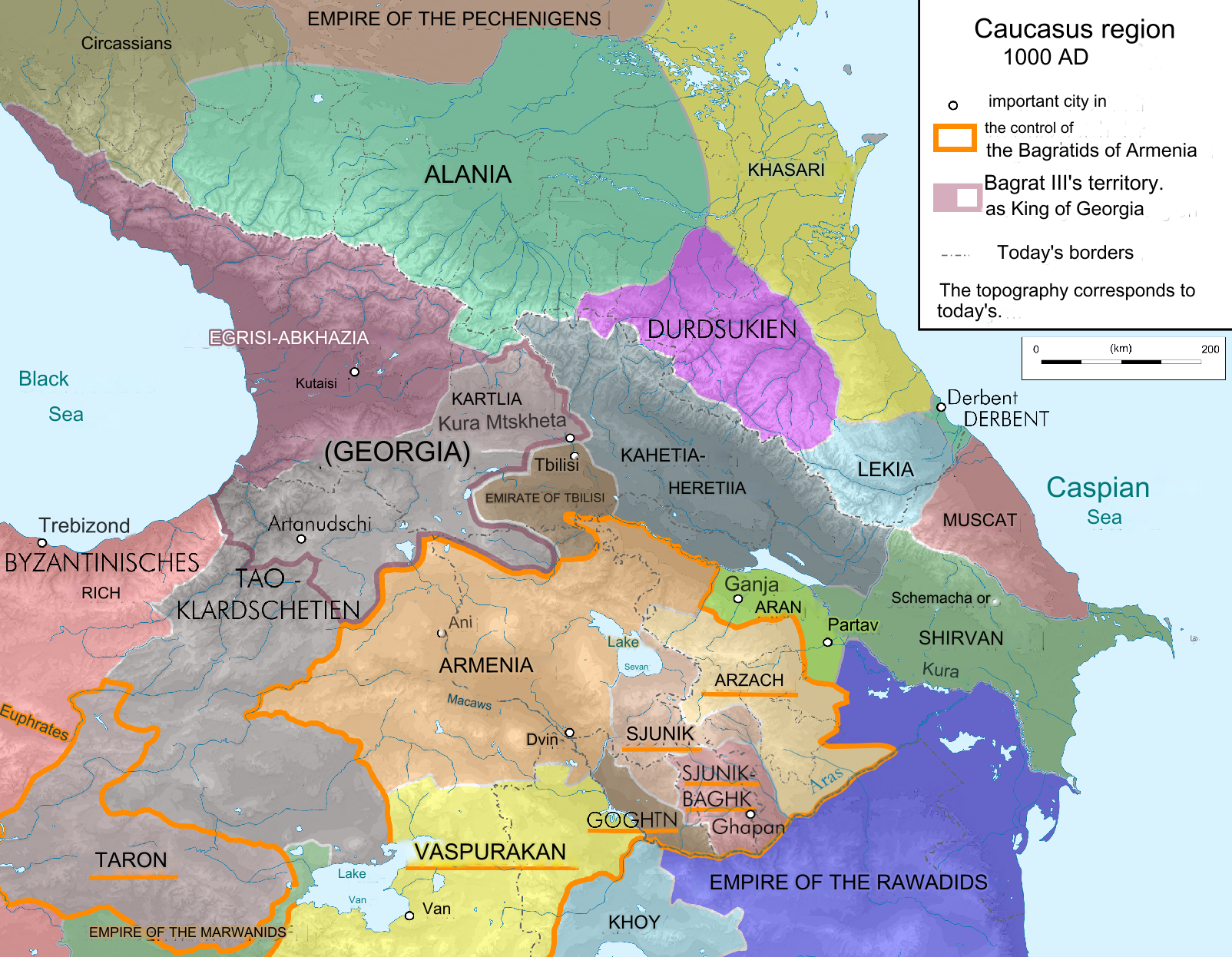
Map of the Caucasus region around the year 1000 AD

On 31 March 1000, Bagrat III’s adoptive father, David III Kuropalates, died, possibly as a result of assassination. According to the Georgian Chronicle of Vakhushti, the lands of Tao fell into desolation following his death. Because David had been compelled to bequeath Tao to the Byzantine Empire after his involvement in the revolt of Bardas Phokas, Emperor Basil II, moved to claim the territory by force. Returning from a campaign in Syria against the Fatimid caliph, Basil faced little resistance: the local nobility, unwilling to challenge such a powerful monarch, recognized Byzantine suzerainty and rejected the authority of Bagrat III. Within months, the emperor completed the conquest of Tao-Klarjeti. To manage local politics, he conferred the title of magistros upon Bagrat’s father Gurgen, while granting the title of Kouropalates to Bagrat himself. This move was intended to set father and son against each other, but no conflict ensued, as Gurgen was regarded as a loyal and upright parent. Bagrat thus became King of Abkhazia and Kouropalates of Iberia, achieving the effective unification of western Georgia, though he simultaneously lost much of his ancestral inheritance to Byzantium.

In 1008, following the death of his father Gurgen I, Bagrat inherited the hereditary title of “King of the Georgians” together with the duchy of Lower Tao–Javakheti. Having united under his authority all the lands ruled by members of the Bagrationi dynasty, Bagrat turned his attention to eastern South Caucasus. His first target was David of Kakheti, prince and chorepiscopus of Kakheti. Bagrat demanded the return of territories annexed by David after his victory in the Kartli war of 978. David refused and declared his intention to resist. In retaliation, Bagrat invaded Kakheti, marching through Kartli and devastating Hereti, an eastern province of the principality. He installed a certain Abulal as mtavari (“count”) of the region, but the local nobility soon overthrew him, regained control of Hereti, and joined their lands to Kakheti.

After learning of the revolt in newly annexed Hereti, Bagrat III assembled his forces and resumed the campaign. He quickly completed the annexation of Hereti, subdued the local nobility in Imereti (western Georgia), and placed the relics of the country’s first Orthodox queen in the region as a symbolic gesture of authority. In 1008, Bagrat launched the conquest of Kakheti, which he completed by 1010 with relatively little resistance. He initially left the fortress of Bodchorma in the hands of Prince Kvirike III of Kakheti, son of Chorepiscopus David, but soon deprived him of it and annexed the principality outright. By the conclusion of this war, Bagrat III had become the undisputed ruler of all Georgia. He had completed the political unification of the country and assumed the royal title of “King of the Abkhazians, Kartvelians, Rans, and Kakhs.”

=== Campaign against Ganja ===
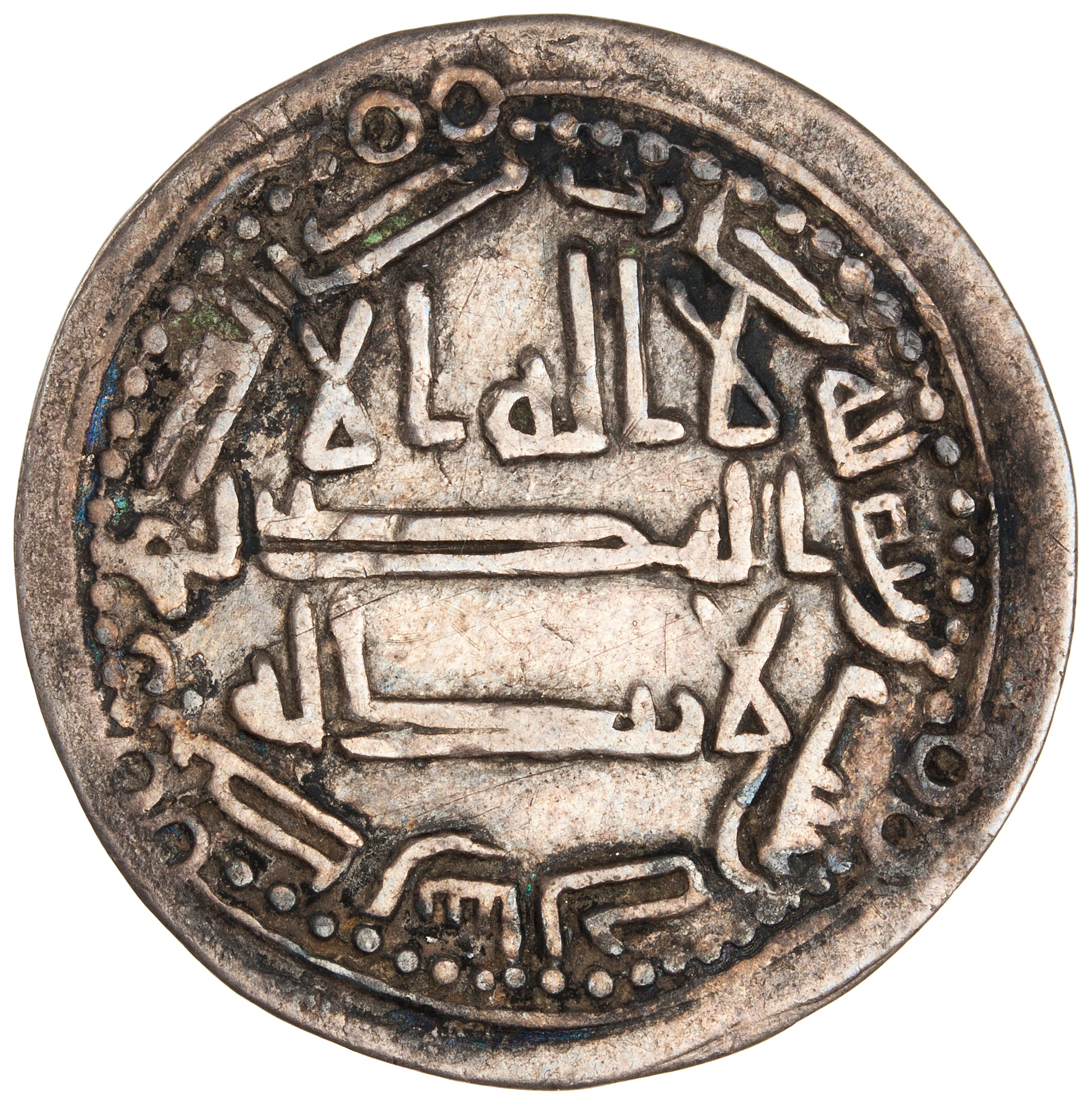
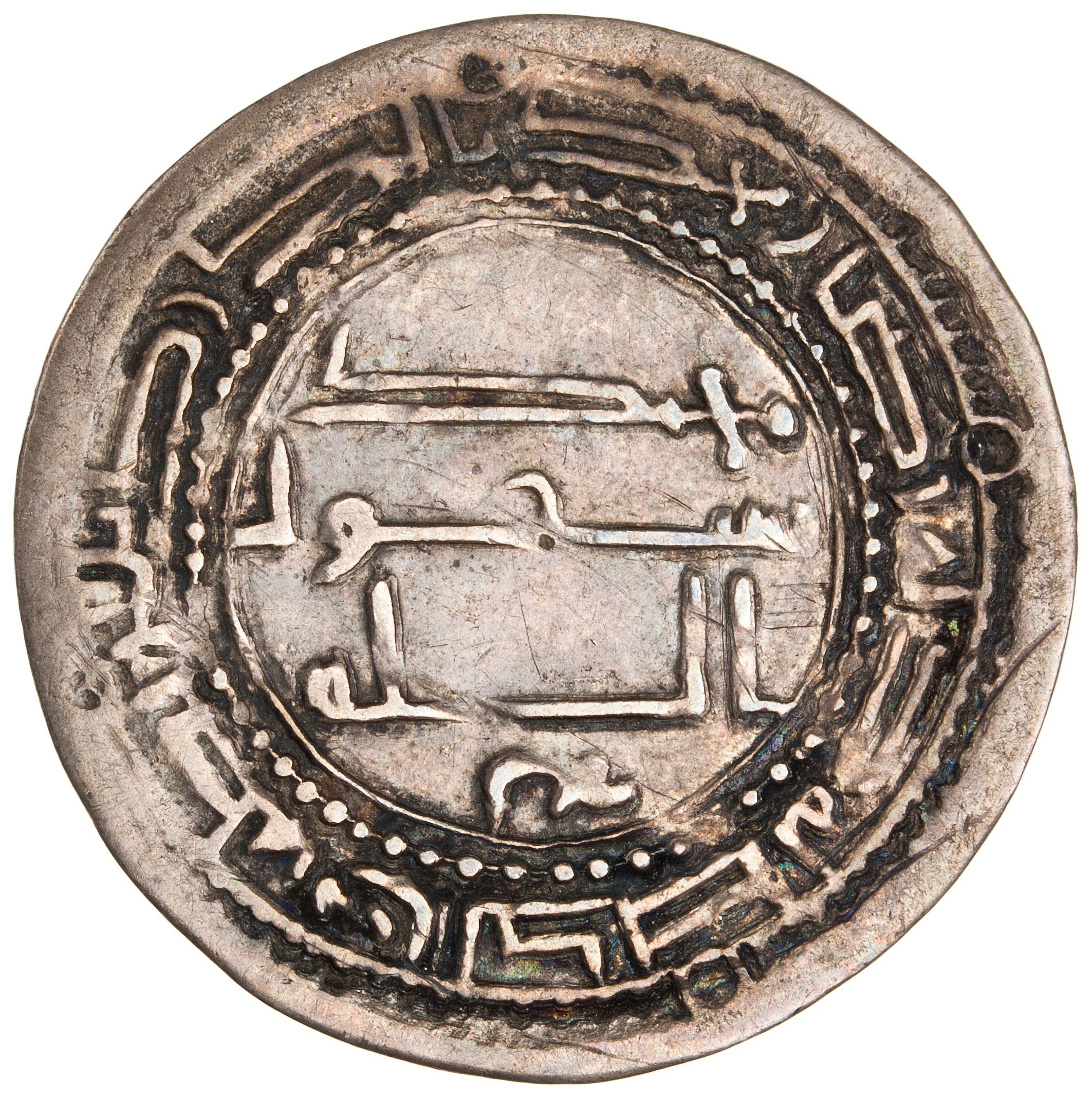
Silver dirham of Bagrat III, minted in Tiflis (Tbilisi). Struck between 1008 and 1014 (left = obverse; right = reverse)

As King of Georgia, Bagrat III pursued military campaigns against neighboring states. His first target was the emirate of Ganja (in present-day Azerbaijan), whose emir, Fadl, had been conducting raids into eastern Georgia. To counter this threat, Bagrat formed an alliance with the Armenian king Gagik I.

In 1012, Georgian and Armenian forces united and marched toward Ganja, advancing through Dzoraget (present-day Shirak in Armenia). Fadl, who had sworn enmity against Christians and had never before faced defeat, was taken by surprise at the approach of the two allied Christian armies. He withdrew into a fortress, preparing for a siege. Bagrat took advantage of the situation by occupying the lands of Arran, which he incorporated as a Georgian province, and laid siege to the fortified city of Shamkor, where the Shaddadid emir had taken refuge. Within days, the city’s defenses were overcome, and Bagrat imposed peace terms on the defeated emir. Fadl became a vassal of Georgia, obligated to support Bagrat in military campaigns and to pay tribute (kharaj) to the Georgian crown. The emir offered lavish gifts to Bagrat and to the Georgian nobility, who in turn persuaded the king to conclude peace without annexing Ganja itself.

=== Relations with Byzantium and further expansion ===
After consolidating eastern South Caucasus, Bagrat III turned his attention to the southwestern frontier with the Byzantine Empire. Since the death of David the Kuropalates in 1000, who had bequeathed his domains to Byzantium, the Tao-Klarjeti region had been incorporated into the Byzantine Empire. Following the death of his father, Bagrat inherited Lower Tao and Javakheti, but he remained without authority over the territories administered directly by Byzantium.

Between 1011 and 1012, Bagrat sought to reclaim his hereditary rights. He waged war against the princes Sumbat of Klarjeti and Gurgen of Klarjeti, who, under Byzantine suzerainty, had adopted the title of "Kings of Klarjeti," challenging Georgian authority. Bagrat defeated them without opposition from the Byzantine Empire, and in 1012 had the two brothers executed while they were imprisoned in the citadel of Tmogvi. Their children were permitted to go into exile in Constantinople.

By annexing the duchy of Klarjeti, Bagrat secured definitive control over all Georgian territories. He then extended his influence beyond Georgia, launching campaigns in the Caucasus. Contemporary Georgian charters report that he imposed tribute on Arran, Shirvan, and even Armenia. He further strengthened his position by allying with the Abbasid caliph al-Qadir, thereby positioning himself as an adversary of the Byzantine emperor Basil II.

Under Bagrat’s reign, Georgia experienced political unity and internal stability. The kingdom faced no noble revolts, and the monarch exercised near-absolute authority. Despite this concentration of power, Bagrat was reportedly admired by his subjects, and even the peasantry regarded themselves as his loyal servants.

=== Death ===
Kingdom of Georgia after the death of Bagrat III (1014).

After his victory over the dukes of Klarjeti, Bagrat III undertook a final journey across his dominions. He traversed the entirety of his kingdom, from Abkhazia to Hereti, passing through Kartli and Kakheti, before reaching the Tao, where he spent the winter of 1013–1014 in the fortress of Panaskerti, a former residence of the rulers of Tao.

Bagrat III died there on 7 May 1014, at an advanced age, described by chroniclers as having long white hair, after a reign of thirty-six years. His body was cared for by Count Zviad Orbelian, a noble of Abkhazia, who arranged its transport northward. Bagrat III was buried later that year in the Bedia Cathedral, located in present-day Abkhazia. He was canonized by the Georgian Orthodox Church on 22 December 2016, his feast day set for 7 May (NS 21 May).

== Religious policies and architectural patronage ==
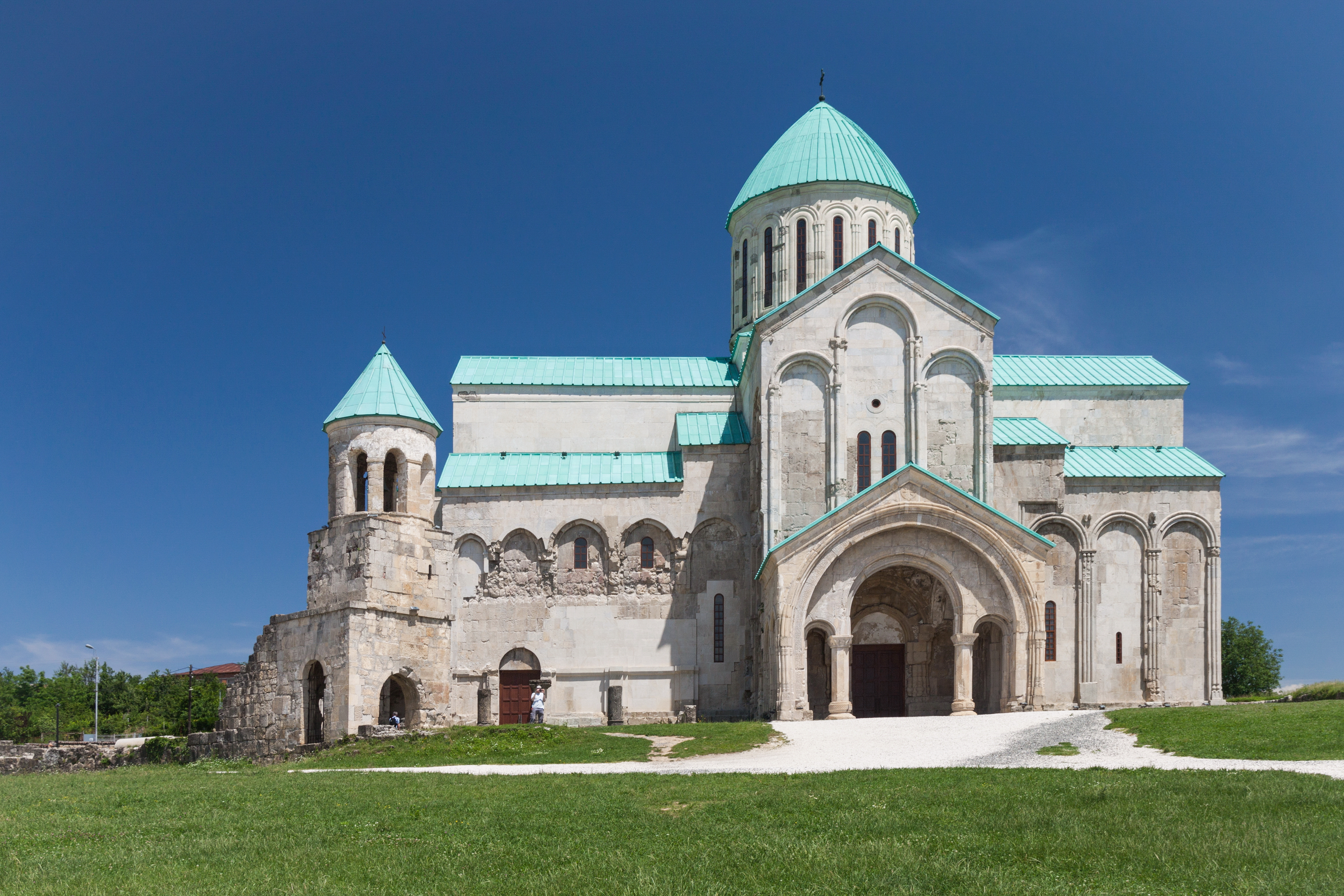
Bagrati Cathedral in Kutaisi, a World Heritage Site.

With the unification of Georgia, Bagrat III established the Catholicos-Patriarch of All Georgia, an institution that continues to exist today. Prior to the 11th century, the Patriarch John IV bore the title of "Catholicos of Iberia". A devout Christian ruler, Bagrat sponsored the construction of numerous churches. Among his foundations was the Bedia Cathedral, completed in 999, which he elevated to the status of an episcopal see and religious capital of Abkhazia, replacing Gudakva in this role. He also initiated the construction of the Bagrati Cathedral in his capital of Kutaisi, completed in 1003. This monumental edifice, once recognized as a UNESCO World Heritage Site, remained inscribed from 1994 until 2017, when it was delisted due to extensive reconstruction works that compromised its integrity and authenticity.

According to Vakhushti and the historian Marie-Félicité Brosset, the Byzantine emperor Basil II, despite strained relations with Georgia, granted the Georgian Patriarchate the monastery of Kestoria, likely located in Greece. Along with the monastery, the Catholicosate received 105 villages, substantial amounts of gold and silver, as well as icons and crosses for church adornment. Vakhushti further claimed that under Bagrat’s protection the Svetitskhoveli Cathedral in Mtskheta, now the seat of the Catholicos-Patriarch of All Georgia, was either constructed or restored using ornaments brought from Kestoria. However, modern scholarship attributes this restoration to the reign of Bagrat’s successor.

== Family ==
Bagrat III married Martha (name attested by Cyril Toumanoff). They had at least one son:

- George I of Georgia (998 or 1002–1027), succeeded his father as King of Georgia.

Some sources also mention another child:

- Basil of Khakhuli, canonized as a saint by the Georgian Orthodox Church.

== Legacy ==
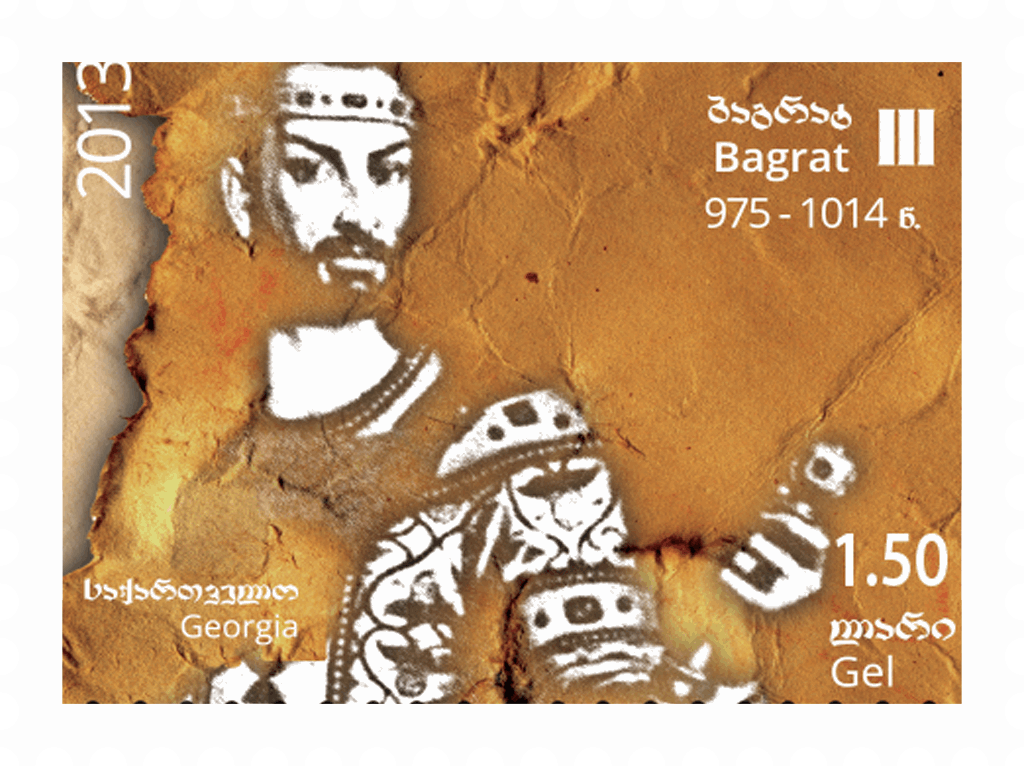
Bagrat III on the 2013 Georgian postage stamp

Bagrat III is regarded by most historians as the first monarch of a unified Kingdom of Georgia, a title that excludes the Iberian ruler Pharnavaz I. His name was borne by several of his descendants, and ten Georgian monarchs were later named Bagrat.

Although relatively little known today outside Georgia, Bagrat III is highly respected within the country. On 21 January 2008, following his presidential election victory, Mikheil Saakashvili delivered a speech in Kutaisi, near the tomb of David IV of Georgia, in which he praised Bagrat’s role in the unification of Georgia. The previous day, Saakashvili had declared that, like Bagrat III, he intended to “reunify all Georgian territories in peace”.

== Bibliography ==
- Kudava, Buba (2026). "An Abkhazian Bagrationi: Three Stories of Bagrat III". Sokhumi.
- Baumer, Christoph (2021). History of the Caucasus. Vol. 1: At the Crossroads of Empires. I.B. Tauris.
- Mikaberidze, Alexander (2015). Historical Dictionary of Georgia. Rowman & Littlefield Publishers. ISBN 9781442241466.
- Allen, William Edward David (1932). A History of the Georgian People. Barnes & Noble. pp. 69–84. ISBN 0389040304.
- Brosset, Marie-Félicité (1849). Histoire de la Géorgie depuis l'Antiquité jusqu'au XIXe siècle. Volume I [History of Georgia from Ancient Times to the 19th Century, Volume 1] (in French). Saint-Petersburg: Imperial Academy of Sciences.
- Grousset, René (1995) [1947]. Histoire de l'Arménie des origines à 1071 (in French). Payot. ISBN 2-228-88912-1.
- Thomson, Robert W. (1996). Rewriting Caucasian history: the medieval Armenian adaptation of the Georgian chronicles; the original Georgian texts and the Armenian adaptation. Oxford: Clarendon Press. ISBN 0198263732.
- Toumanoff, Cyril (1990). Les dynasties de la Caucasie chrétienne de l'Antiquité jusqu'au XIXe siècle (in French). Rome: Tables généalogiques et chronologiques.

Preceded by Theodosius III	King of Abkhazia; 978–1008	Succeeded by -
Preceded by Position established	King of Georgia; 1008–1014	Succeeded by George I
