= Ujarma fortress =

- Georgian: უჯარმის ციხე
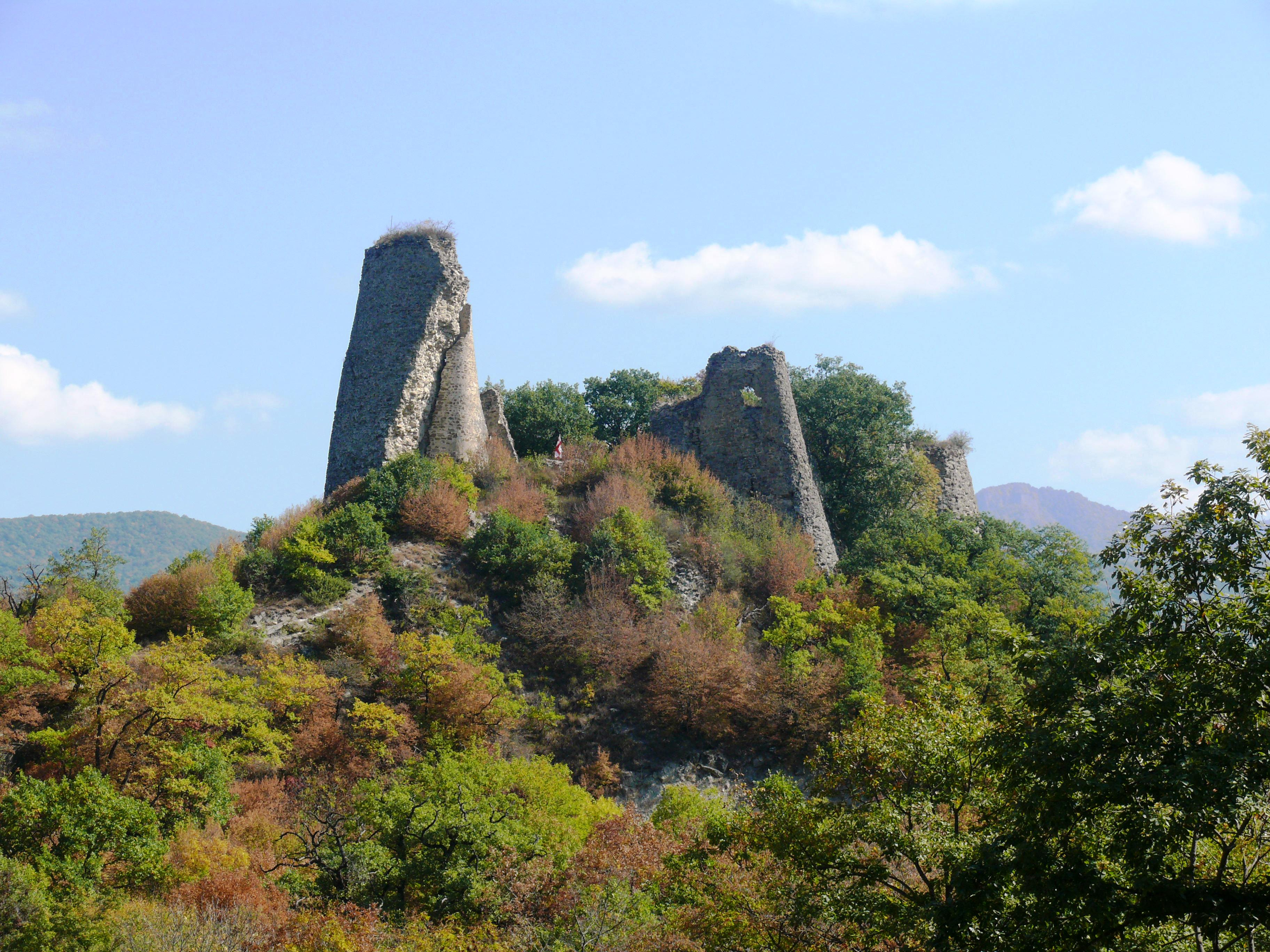
- Ruins of Ujarma fortress as visible from the road.
- Location: Sagarejo Municipality, Georgia
- Coordinates: 41°48′38.8″N 45°9′13″E
- Type: Cyclopean fortress

Ujarma (Georgian: უჯარმის ციხე) is a medieval fortress-town at the Outer Kakheti region, in the municipality of Sagarejo Municipality, Georgia. It is located on the right bank of the river Iori, on the Tbilisi — Telavi road, 4 km (2.48 mi) north of Ujarma village, near Gombori Pass through Tsiv-Gombori Range in the historical-geographical province Gare Kakheti.

== History ==
According to Georgian chronicler Leonti Mroweli, the cornerstone of the Ujarma fortress was built by the King of Iberia, Aspacures I, in the 3rd to 4th centuries. In the reign of King Vakhtang Gorgasali and King Dachi, the fortress was extended and used as a residence. During their time, the citadel was built with strong towers and strong walls, palaces and churches. After Vakhtang V made Ujar one of his residences in the second half of the century, the fortress-town experienced a special rise. 4th to 8th century Ujar played an important role in the history of the country.

Ujamara was conquered in 914 when the Arabs invaded the Caucasus mountains, formerly dominated by the Persians. The fight left severe destruction in the building. The upper fortress was destroyed in the 10th century by the Arab conqueror Abul Kassim, but was restored in the 12th century by King George III. After that the importance of Ujarma falls and continues to exist as a small settlement. In the 12th century Ujar restored King George III - (1156 - 1184) and made it his treasure.

The Mongol domination in the 13th century, the disintegration of the Kingdom of Georgia into kingdoms at the end of the 15th century, gradually reduced the importance of Ujarma and made the once prosperous city a small place.

== Architecture ==
The fortress consisted of two parts: the Upper Fortress (the Citadel) and the Lower City. A royal palace, consisting of a two-storey building, was located in the eastern part of the Citadel. The Upper Fortress was destroyed in the 10th century by the Arabian conqueror Abul Kassim but was restored in the 12th century by King George III who used it as a treasury.

The fortress-city was built on a high hill on the right bank of the river Iori and was the closing gate of the narrow exit of Ivory. The city had several doors. The main door was to the west of the castle. There are watchtowers in the main citadel of the castle-town. The ruins of a two-storey residential building were found in the northeast corner of the castle.

A two-storey church named after Jvarpatiosani is built in the prison. The first floor is relatively old, the second floor was built in the 10th to 11th centuries. The church has a high nave, with windows on the east and west sides. The walls of the church are built of large slabs of stone and partly of old piles of blocks.

The castle fence extended from the north side, down a steep rocky slope, to the river bank. 9 towers were placed at equal distances in these walls. The second and third floors of the towers were designed to house the cavalry. The towers had a closed, bathing roof. There were conglomerates on the perimeter of Bani, and a corridor-exit behind them.

There is a Sunday church by the river Iori. Its walls are built of sandstone and brick, Lavgardan is a rhombic pile. A new church has been built on the south side, under which a crypt is arranged. Traces of an old wall can be seen. Presumably, there must have been the remains of a castle built by King Asfaguri here.

== Inheritance ==
Excavations have uncovered glass and bronze bracelets in the castle-town area; Bronze rings and buttons, overlay pitchers, bakery, tombs (12th to 13th centuries).

== Interesting facts ==
- Vakhtang Gorgasali died in Ujarma, severely wounded.
- Forbes magazine listed Ujar in the list of 9 oldest castles in the world in 2012.
- On 7 November 2006, by decree of the President of Georgia, Ujarma was declared an Immovable Cultural Monument of National Significance.
