= Gardabani (historic district) =

- Historical Region 9th-century
- Interactive map of Gardabani
- Coordinates: 41°45′N 45°43′E
- Country: Kakheti

Gardabani (Georgian: გარდაბანი) was a region in medieval Georgia, in the extreme southeast of the country, centered at the fortress of Khunani. This land roughly corresponds to a district lying south of Tbilisi, west of the Mtkvari River.

== History ==
The historical geography of Gardabani has caused a certain amount of confusion because medieval Georgian writers call both the Iberian land of Gardabani and the Armenian principality of Gardman by the name "Gardabani". Although these two regions were distinct, the homonymy may be due to an early occupation of both these territories by one ethnic group which left upon them its onomastic imprint.

In the 9th century, the Gardabanian nobility, particularly the clan of Donauri, dominated the eastern Georgian principality of Kakheti. For this reason, the 9th-century Kakheti is frequently referred to as "Gardabani" in the Georgian chronicles.
