= Chorbishop =

Rank of Christian clergy

A chorbishop is a rank of Christian clergy below bishop. The name chorepiscope or chorepiscopus (plural chorepiscopi) is taken from the Greek χωρεπίσκοπος and means "rural bishop".

== History ==
Chorepiscopi are first mentioned by Eusebius as existing in the second century. In the beginning, it seems the chorepiscopi exercised regular episcopal functions in their rural districts, but from the late third century they were subject to city or metropolitan bishops. The Synod of Ancyra (314) specifically forbade them to ordain deacons or priests. The Council of Sardica (343) decreed that no chorepiscopus should be consecrated where a priest would suffice, and so the chorepiscopi in the Byzantine Church gradually disappeared.

The first mentions of chorepiscopi in the Western church are from the 5th or 6th century, where they were found mainly in Germany (especially Bavaria) and the Frankish lands. In the Western Church, they were treated as auxiliary bishops and operated like archdeacons or vicars general. They gradually disappeared as an office by the 12th century in the West and were replaced by archdeacons to administer subdivisions of a diocese.

In the principality of Kakheti in medieval Georgia, the title of chorepiscopus (k'orepiskoposi or k'orikozi) became secular and was borne by several princes of that province from the early 9th century into the 11th.

== Present practice ==
Some Eastern Catholic and Oriental Orthodox churches still have chorbishops.

The churches of the West Syriac tradition — namely the Syriac Orthodox Church, the Syriac Catholic Church, the Maronite Church, the Malankara Syriac Orthodox Church, the Malankara Orthodox Syrian Church and the Syro-Malankara Catholic Church — also preserve the office, calling it corepiscopos or khuroyo. Within these traditions, the chorbishop serves as an elevated clerical rank among priests, and are sometimes referred to as an archpriest. Historically, a chorbishop exercised administrative oversight over small villages and rural communities on behalf of the local bishop. In contemporary practice, the title has largely become an honorary rank, with chorbishops carrying out the same routine pastoral duties as standard parish priests. However, a chorbishop retains the authority to ordain individuals to minor orders when delegated to do so by the bishop. He wears a black cassock with violet trim, a matching waist band (cincture), and a pectoral cross, as part of his non-liturgical wear. In addition to the normal liturgical vestments of a priest, he wears an outer cope, symbolically similar to the masnapso of bishops.

In the Maronite Church, a chorbishop is the highest of the three Median Orders, ranking above the orders of archdeacon and periodeut. Like a bishop, a chorbishop is ordained, and entitled to all vestments proper to a bishop, including the mitre (hat) and crozier (staff). The Synod of Mount Lebanon (1736) limited only the jurisdiction of a chorbishop, permitting him to ordain to the minor orders (cantor, reader and the subdiaconate), but not the major orders of diaconate, priesthood, or episcopacy. The manuscript tradition of the Syriac Maronite Church demonstrates that the same text is used for the imposition of hand for both bishops and chorbishops. The title of the ordination for a chorbishop reads, in fact, "The chirotony by which are completed the chorbishops and the metropolitans and the high orders of priesthood." The role of protosyncellus (vicar general) is often filled by a chorbishop.

== See also ==
- Synods of Antioch
- Synod of Ancyra

== Books ==
- Zaplotnik, John Leo (1927). De vicariis foraneis. "Chapter IV." (in Latin). Washington: Catholica universitas Americae, 1927.
