= Georgian monarchs family tree from antiquity to the unification =

Georgian monarchs family tree from antiquity (Note: The Georgian kingship had stubborn and staunch devotion to rules of legitimism and the dynastic succession of a new monarch should have had a biological connection and/or matrimony with an existing family. The Pharnavazids, Chosroids and Bagratids were related through descent, intermarriage and adoption.) to the unification (Note: The family tree descends from the monarchs of the Kingdom of Iberia; the Sassanian-demoted principality of Iberia, ultimately succeeded and restored as the Kingdom of the Iberians; and the unified Kingdom of Georgia.)

- The bolded border indicates the monarchs
- ----- The dashed lines indicate a marriage relationship
- ....... The dotted lines indicate multiple generations skipped

unknown
Samara (Note: Samara was a chieftain and ruler of Mtskheta's Kartvelians claiming descent from a mythic national founder, Kartlos.); Ruler of Mtskheta fl. 4th c. BC	(Son)
**PHARNAVAZID dynasty**
Artaxias I d. 160 BC; **King of Armenia** r. 189 – 160 BC	Pharnavaz I 329, 326, or 311 BC d. (aged 92); **King of Iberia** r. 302 BC – 237 BC or r. 299 BC – 234 BC or r. 284 BC – 219 BC	(Daughter)	(Daughter)	Kuji fl. 4th century BC; Duke of Colchis
Tigranes I **King of Armenia** r. 120 BC – 95 BC	Artavasdes I d. 115 BC; **King of Armenia** r. 159 BC – 115 BC	Sauromaces I **King of Iberia** r. c. 234 – c. 159 BC
adopted
Tigranes the Great; **King of Armenia** r. 95 – 55 BC	(Princess)	Mirian I **King of Iberia** r. 159 – 109 BC
**ARTAXIAD dynasty**
Artavasdes II; **King of Armenia** r. 55 – 34 BC	Artaxias I **King of Iberia** r. 90 – 78 BC	(Princess)	Pharnajom; **King of Iberia** d. 90 BC r. 109 – 90 BC
Tigranes III; **King of Armenia** r. 20 – 8 BC	Artoces; **King of Iberia** r. 78 – 63 BC	Mirian II; **King of Iberia** c. 90–20BC r. 30 – 20 BC
Tigranes IV; **King of Armenia** r. 8 BC – 1 AD	Pharnavaz II; **King of Iberia** d. 30 BC r. 63 BC – 32 BC	Artaxias II; **King of Iberia** r. c. 20 BC – 1 AD
adopted
(Princess)	Kartam; Duke of Colchis d. 33 BC
(Artaxiad princess)	Pharasmanes I **King of Iberia** r. c. 1 – 58	Mithridates; **King of Armenia** r. 35–37, 42–51
Mihrdat I **King of Iberia** r. 58–106	Rhadamistus; **King of Armenia** r. 51–53 r. 54–55	Zenobia
Amazasp I **King of Iberia** r. 106–116
Pharasmanes II; **King of Iberia** r. 117–138
Ghadam; **King of Iberia** r. 132–135
Pharasmanes III; **King of Iberia** r. 138–161
Amazasp II; **King of Iberia** r. 185–189	(Princess)	Vologases V King of Parthia r. 191–208
**ARSACID** **dynasty**
Rev I (Note: King Rev I was a great-grandson of King Mithridates V of Parthia); **King of Iberia** r. 189–216	Khosrov I **King of Armenia** r. 191–217
Vache; **King of Iberia** r. 216–234	Tiridates II; **King of Armenia** r. 217–252
Bacurius I **King of Iberia** r. 234–249	Khosrov II; **King of Armenia** r. 252–258
Mihrdat II; **King of Iberia** r. 249–265
Aspacures I **King of Iberia** r. 265–284
**CHOSROID** **dynasty**
Abeshura (Note: Her father died in 284 AD, who remained the last in the Pharnavazid line. Georgian royal house arranged the wedding of Abeshura to Mirian, who according to the Georgian annals is identified as the firstborn but illegitimate son of an unspecified Sasanian Shahanshah. Mirian was a Parthian Mihranid who would establish a Chosroid dynasty. Because of Mirian’s union with Abeshura, the couple's offspring could rightfully claim to have Pharnavazid blood, but Abeshura died at the age of 15. Because the young couple had no children the primary Pharnavazid line came to a complete end.)	Mirian III; **King of Iberia** r. 284–361	Nana	Tiridates III; **King of Armenia** r. 298–330
Aspacures II (Note: Kings Aspacures II and Rev II through their mother Queen Nana were the direct descendants of King Mithridates VI of Pontus (15 generations through Queen Dynamis); King Seleucus I Nicator (22 generations through the mother of Mithridates VI of Pontus, Queen Laodice VI); Triumvir Mark Antony (16 generations through Gepaepyris, Antonia Tryphaena, Pythodorida of Pontus and Antonia Prima); Julio-Claudian dynasty (17 generations through the mother of Mark Antony, Julia); King Achaemenes (35~40 generations through Mithridates VI of Pontus)); **King of Iberia** r. 363–365	Rev II; **King of Iberia** r. 345–361	Salome d. 361
Mihrdat III; **King of Iberia** r. 365–380 diarch 370–378	Sauromaces II; **King of Iberia** r. 361–363 diarch 370–378	Trdat; **King of Iberia** r. 394–406
Peranius; General of the Roman Empire	Phazas; Officer of the Roman Empire	Aspacures III; **King of Iberia** r. 380–394	(Princess)
Pacurius; General of the Roman Empire	Jovian; Emperor of Rome r. 363–364	Mihrdat IV; **King of Iberia** r. 409–411	Pharasmanes IV; **King of Iberia** r. 406–409	Osdukht	Bacurius; General of the Roman Empire
Maria	Archil; **King of Iberia** r. 411–435	Barzabod; Prince of Gardman d. c. 440	Bosmarios	Bakurdukht
Hormizd III d. 459; King of the Sasanian Empire r. 457–459	Mihrdat V **King of Iberia** r. 435–447	Sagdukht	Leo I the Thracian; Emperor of Rome r. 457–474	Peter; Bishop of Maiuma d. 491
Balendukht	Vakhtang I **King of Iberia** c. 439/443 – c. 502/522 r. c. 447/449 – c. 502/522	Helena
Dachi (Note: King Dachi through his mother Queen Balendukht was the direct descendant of Shah Ardashir I (10 generations)); **King of Iberia** r. 522–534
Bacurius II; **King of Iberia** r. 534–547	Leo(n)	Mihrdat
Pharasmanes V **King of Iberia** r. 547–561	(Prince)
**GUARAMID dynasty**
Pharasmanes VI; **King of Iberia** r. 561–?	Guaram I Prince of Iberia r. 588–590
Bacurius III d. 580; **King of Iberia** r. ?–580
Adarnase I Prince of Iberia r. 627–637/642	Stephen I d. 628; Prince of Iberia r. 590–627
Stephen II; Prince of Iberia r. 637/642 – c. 650
Adarnase II; Prince of Iberia r. c. 650 – 684/685	Guaram II; Prince of Iberia r. 684/685–pre-693
Stephen; Prince of Kakheti r. 685–739	Guaram III; Prince of Iberia r. 693–748
Mirian; Prince of Kakheti r. 736–741
Nerse I Nersiani	(Princess)
**NERSIANID dynasty**
Adarnase III; Prince of Iberia r. c. 748 – 760	Guaram IV; Prince of Iberia r. 748	(Princess)	Archil the Martyr d. 786; Prince of Kakheti r. 736–786
Nerse; Prince of Iberia r. 760–772 r. 775–779/780	Stephen III; Prince of Iberia r. 779/780–786
**BAGRATIONI dynasty**
(Princess)	Adarnase I d. 807; Prince of Tao r. c. 780 (775/786) – 807
Ashot I Kouropalates d. c. 826/830; Prince of Iberia r. 813–830	Latavri; Princess of Iberia	Juansher II; Prince of Kakheti r. 786–807	John; Prince of Kakheti r. 786–790
Adarnase II d. c. 870; **Co-ruler of Tao-Klarjeti** r. 830–867	Bagrat I d. 876; **Co-ruler of Tao-Klarjeti** r. 830–876	Guaram Mampali d. 882; **Co-ruler of Tao-Klarjeti** r. 830–881
Gurgen I **Grand Duke of Tao** r. 881–891	Ashot the Beautiful d. 867	Sumbat I **Grand Duke of Klarjeti** r. 870–889	Adarnase	David I d. 881; Prince of Iberia r. 876–881	Ashot	Nasra; Grand Duke of Samtskhe, Shavsheti, and Artaani r. 881–888
Adarnase III; **Grand Duke of Tao** r. 891–896	Ashot the Immature; **Grand Duke of Tao** r. 908–918	Bagrat I **Grand Duke of Klarjeti** r. 889–900	David I **Grand Duke of Klarjeti** r. 900–943	Adarnase IV (Note: Adarnase IV restored Georgian kingship in 888 as the Kingdom of the Iberians and this would go on to dominate the political life of Georgia for a thousand years.) d. 923; Prince of Iberia r. 881–888; **King of the Iberians** r. 888–923
David; **Grand Duke of Tao** r. 896–908	Gurgen; **Grand Duke of Tao** r. 918–941	Dinar; Queen of Hereti	Adarnase II of Klarjeti d. 945	Ashot the Swift d. 939	David d. 908	Gurgen I d. 923	Sumbat II d. 988; **Grand Duke of Klarjeti** r. 961–966	David II; **King of the Iberians** r. 923–937	Bagrat I **Grand Duke of Tao** r. 941–945	Sumbat I **King of the Iberians** r. 954–958	Ashot II; **Grand Duke of Tao** r. 937–954
Bagrat d. 922	Gurgen d. 968	David II; **Grand Duke of Klarjeti** r. 988–993	Bagrat II d. 988	Adarnase V **Grand Duke of Tao** r. 945–961	Adarnase IV d. 983	Bagrat II; **King of the Iberians** r. 958–994
Sumbat III; **Grand Duke of Klarjeti** r. 993–1011 (Note: King Bagrat III, the first monarch of unified Georgia was ruthless in his state administration. While visiting Castle of Panaskerti in Tao, king summoned his two cousins, Sumbat III and Gurgen. They were arrested and executed. Sumbat’s son Bagrat, and Gurgen’s son Demetrius, escaped to the Byzantine Empire. The Bagrationi line of Tao was already extinct since 941; now with purging his own cousins the line of Klarjeti was also gone and no rival could ever claim the Georgian throne.)	Gurgen	David III (Note: David III, being childless, took advice from the Georgian aristocracy and adopted his kin, prince Bagrat in 975. This will lead and pave the way for the unification of Georgia.); **Grand Duke of Tao** r. 966–1001	Bagrat II; **Grand Duke of Tao** r. 961–966	Gurgen; **King of the Iberians** r. 994–1008
adopted
Bagrat III of Klarjeti; **King of Klarjeti** r. 1027–1028	Demetrius d. 1028	Bagrat III (Note: Bagrat III was the first king of a politically unified Georgia designated "Sakartvelo". The term "Sakartvelo" would literally mean "all-Georgian kingdom", "all Georgia" or "whole Georgia". Sakartvelo is still used in modern times as the official name of the country.) c. 960 – c. 1014; King of Abkhazia r. 978–1014; **King of Georgia** r. 1008–1014
Mariam d. bef. 1103	George I 998/1002–1027; **King of Georgia** r. 1014–1027	Alda of Alania	Basil of Khakhuli ?c. 981 – c. 1040
Gurandukht d. bef.1072	Marta	Kata	Helena Argyre d. c. 1033	Bagrat IV; 1018–1072; **King of Georgia** r. 1027–1072	Borena of Alania	Demetrius of Anacopia d. 1042
George II c. 1054 – c. 1112; **King of Georgia** r. 1072–1089	Mariam	Michael VII; Byzantine emperor	Martha-Maria; 1053–1118	Nikephoros III; 1002–1081; Byzantine emperor	David
Rusudan of Armenia	David IV; 1073–1125; **King of Georgia** r. 1089–1125	Gurandukht	Aton of Alania
Demetrius I c. 1093 – c. 1156; **King of Georgia** r. 1125–1154 r. 1155–1156	George	Zurab d. 1125	Tamar d. 1161	Kata
David V **King of Georgia** r. 1154–1155	Rusudan	George III; **King of Georgia** r. 1156–1184	Bagrationi	Rusudan	Jadaron of Alania
Demna of Georgia bef.1155-c. 1178	Rusudan; 1158/1160	Yury; Bogolyubsky b. c. 1160; Prince of Novgorod r. 1172–1175	Tamar (Note: Queen Tamar was the first female monarch (mepe) of Georgia.) c. 1160 – c. 1213; **King of Georgia** r. 1184–1213	David Soslan; King Consort r. c. 1187/1189 – c. 1207
George IV (Note: George IV, while relaxing in Kakheti, in the village of Velistsikhe, he spotted a pretty young woman, a freeman's daughter; he seduced her, and, although she was married, installed her at royal court. In 1215, she had a son with him (the future king David VII), whom the king gave to his sister Rusudan to bring up. This upset the Georgian Orthodox Church and deputation of bishops, the Catholicos and ministers came to remonstrate with the king: the woman was a commoner as well as another man’s wife. The king was forced to let nuns escort his mistress back to her husband. But he adamantly deemed the woman from Velistsikhe his wife and refused any marriage which his court might negotiate for him. The king would not beget a legitimate heir.); 1191–1223; **King of Georgia** r. 1213–1222/1223	Rusudan c. 1194 – c. 1245	Ghias ad-Din; 1223–c. 1226
David VII; 1215–1270; **King of Georgia** r. 1247–1270	David VI; 1225–1293; **King of Georgia** r. 1245–1259; King of Imereti r. 1259–1293	Pervâne	Gürcü Hatun fl. 1237 – c. 1286	Kaykhusraw II; Sultan of the Seljuqs of Rûm
George	Tamar	Demetrius II; 1259–1289; **King of Georgia** r. 1270–1289	Vakhtang II; **King of Georgia** r. 1289–1292	Constantine I King of Imereti r. 1293–1327	Michael; King of Imereti r. 1327–1329	Kayqubad II; Sultan of Rûm r. 1249–1257
Lasha	Manuel	Rusudan	Baidu	Iadgar
Öljätäi (Note: She was a Borjigin princess and a great-great-granddaughter of Genghis Khan.)	David VIII; 1273–1311; **King of Georgia** r. 1293–1311	George V 1286/1289–1346; **King of Georgia** r. 1299–1302 r. 1314–1346	Vakhtang III; 1276–1308; **King of Georgia** r. 1302–1308	Ripsime
House of **ALASTANELI**
George VI; **King of Georgia** r. 1311–1313	David IX; **King of Georgia** r. 1346–1360	Demetre; Ruler of Dmanisi	Giorgi; Ruler of Samshvilde	Alexios III; 1338–1390; Emperor of Trebizond
Helena d. 1366	Bagrat V **King of Georgia** r. 1360–1393	Anna of Trebizond; 1357–1406	Gulkhan-Eudokia d. 1395	Manuel III; 1364–1417; Emperor of Trebizond
George VII d. 1405/1407; **King of Georgia** r. 1393/1395–1407/1405	Constantine I **King of Georgia** r. 1405/1407–1412	David	Tamar	Olympias
Alexander I 1386–1445/46; **King of Georgia** r. 1412–1442	Bagrat	George; **Co-King of Georgia** r. 1408–1412
Vakhtang IV c. 1413 – c. 1446; **King of Georgia** r. 1442–1446	Bagrationi c. 1411/1412–bef.1438	Demetrius c. 1413–1453; **Co-King of Georgia** r. 1433–1446	George VIII; 1417–1476; **King of Georgia** r. 1446–1466; King of Kakheti r. 1466–1476	David II; Catholicos-Patriarch of All Georgia; 1426–1428	Zaal	Bagrat VI c. 1439 – c. 1478; King of Imereti r. 1463–1478; **King of Georgia** r. 1465–1478	David
Constantine II c. 1447 – c. 1505; **King of Georgia** (Kartli) r. 1478–1505	Alexander I 1445/c. 1456–1511; King of Kakheti; 1476–1511	Alexander II d. 1510; **King of Georgia** r. 1478; King of Imereti r. 1483–1510
**BAGRATIONI** dynasty of the Kingdom of Kartli	**BAGRATIONI** dynasty of the Kingdom of Kakheti	**BAGRATIONI** dynasty of the Kingdom of Imereti

== Bibliography ==
- Rapp, S. H. Jr. (2016) The Sasanian World Through Georgian Eyes, Caucasia and the Iranian Commonwealth in Late Antique Georgian Literature, Sam Houston State University, USA, Routledge, ISBN 9781472425522
- Rayfield, D. (2013) Edge of Empires: A History of Georgia, Reaktion Books, ISBN 9781780230702, ISBN 9781780230702
- Settipani, C. (2006) Continuité des élites à Byzance durant les siècles obscurs. Les princes caucasiens et l'Empire du VIe au IXe siècle, Paris, ISBN 9782701802268
- Toumanoff, C. (1990) The dynasties of Christian Caucasus from Antiquity to the 19th century: Genealogical and chronological tables, Rome

=== Further reading ===
- The Georgian Chronicles, Life of the Georgian kings, royal annals, TITUS (Online Version).
- Conversion of Kartli (chronicle), The Chronicle, royal annals
- Marie-Félicité Brosset, History of Georgia from Antiquity to the 19th century, Volume 1-7, Saint-Petersburg, 1848–58
