= David III of Tao =

David III the Great დავით III დიდი
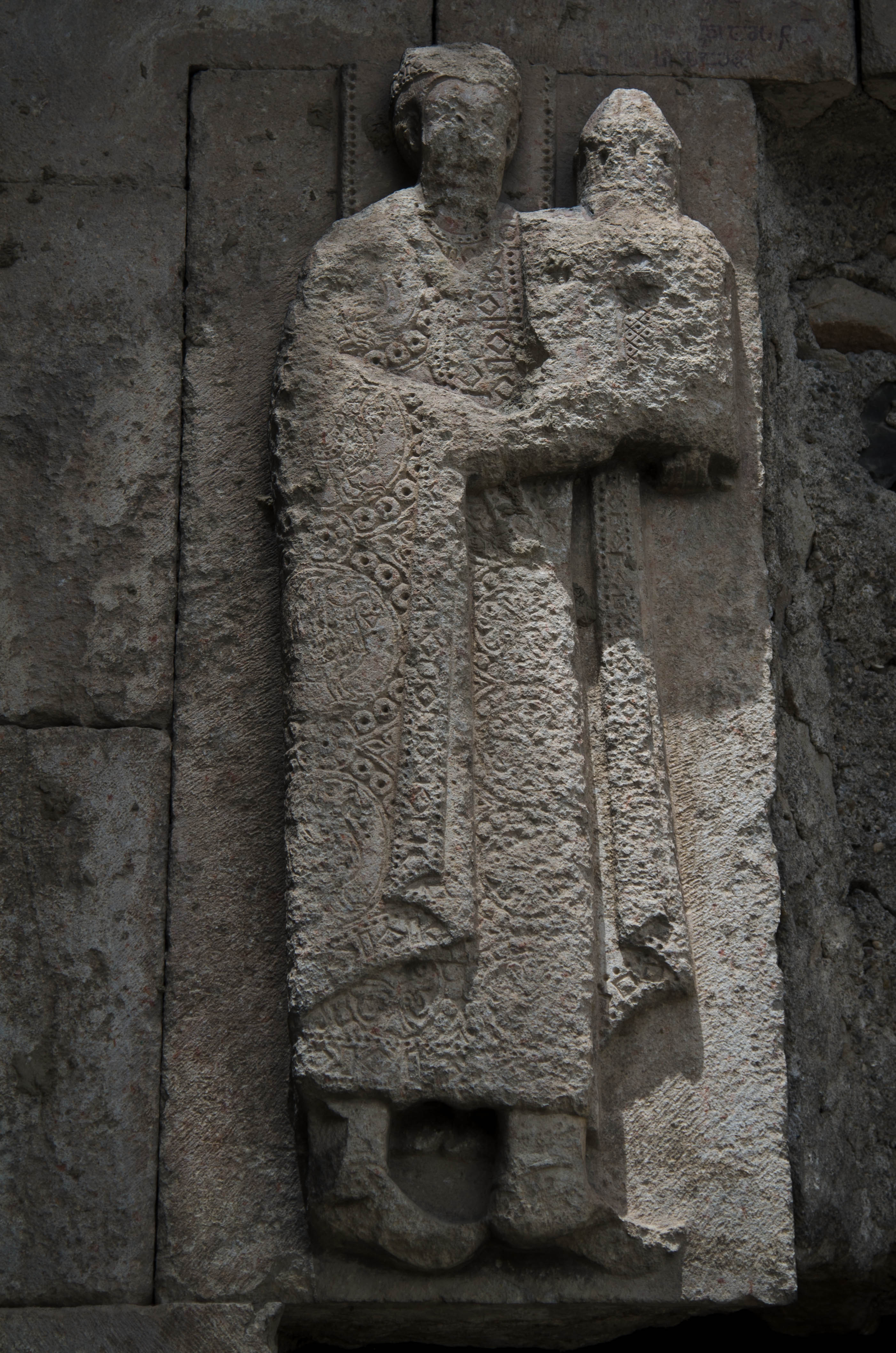
- David III the Great as depicted on a bas-relief from the Oshki Monastery. It was David’s use of Byzantine imagery that influenced the appearance of royal power of Georgia in the following two centuries.

Duke of Upper Tao
- Reign: 966–1000/1001
- Predecessor: Bagrat II

Curopalates of Kingdom of Iberia
- Reign: 978–1000/1001
- Successor: Bagrat III
- Born: 930s
- Died: 1000/1001; Tao-Klarjeti
- Issue: Bagrat III (adopted)
- Dynasty: Bagrationi dynasty
- Father: Adarnase V
- Religion: Georgian Orthodox Church

David III Kuropalates (Georgian: დავით III კურაპალატი) or David III the Great (დავით III დიდი, Davit’ III Didi), also known as David II, (c. 930s – 1000/1001) was a Georgian prince of the Bagratid family of Tao, a historic region in the Georgian–Armenian marchlands. A member of the Kuropalates branch of the dynasty, he inherited the principality in 961 jointly with his brother Bagrat, and ruled as sole prince of Upper Tao from 966 until his murder in 1000 or 1001. Kuropalates was a Byzantine courtier title bestowed upon him in 977 or 978 and again in 990. Under his rule, the principality of Tao reached the zenith of its power.

David is best known for his crucial assistance to the Byzantine Macedonian dynasty in the 976–979 civil war and his unique role in the political unification of various Georgian polities, as well as his patronage of Christian culture and learning. He captured Manzikert, waged a prolonged struggle against the Marwanids and the emirs of Adharbayjan, and intervened in disputes among the princes of Armenia and Georgia, acting as both arbiter and mediator. Between 987 and 989, David joined his friend Bardas Phokas in a revolt against the Byzantine emperor Basil II, but was defeated and agreed to cede his lands to the empire on his death. Yet he was able to secure for his heir, Bagrat III, an opportunity to become the first ruler of a unified Georgian kingdom. Following his death, his domains were annexed by the Byzantine Empire. Armenian and Georgian sources characterize him as a just, peace-loving, and generous ruler.

== History ==
=== Origin and background ===
David was the younger son of Adarnase V (Adarnase Kouropalates, died 961), a representative of the Second House of Tao, a branch of the Kartli line of the Georgian Bagrationi (Bagratid) dynasty which held sway over Tao (a province on the historic Georgian-Armenian border known to the Armenians as Tayk; now part of Turkey) since the extinction of the original Tao line in the 940s. According to Adontz, Adarnase ruled from 958 to 961, spending his final years in a monastery after being forced out by his two sons, Bagrat and David. David's brother, Bagrat Eristavi, held the title of eristavt-eristavi ("duke of dukes") until his death in 966 (some sources say 969). David himself earned widespread renown for his martial valor and military skill.

=== Accession and early rule ===
Upon the death of his father, Adarnase Kouropalates, in 961, David inherited the principality jointly with his brother Bagrat; following Bagrat's death (in 966 or 969), he became sole ruler and acquired the epithet "the Great". This succession is corroborated by a Georgian inscription carved above the outer portal of Oshki Monastery, which mentions Adarnase Kouropalates, the eristavt-eristavi Bagrat, and David Magistros; the inscription dates to between 958 and 961, when David still held the title of magistros. He succeeded his brother Bagrat II as a duke of Tao in 966, and through his expansionist policy and flexible diplomacy began assembling a larger state.

Kartlis Tskhovreba records that Sumbat Kouropalates was succeeded by his son Bagrat Regveni ("the Simple"), who reigned until 994 as a contemporary of David Kouropalates. After Bagrat's death, David made no claim to his royal throne, as he possessed separate and fully independent domains of his own. The administrative centers of David Kouropalates's realm were the towns of Olti and Narivan.

=== Titles ===
David III held the Byzantine court title of magistros in 973, and was elevated to the rank of kouropalates in 977 (some scholars date this to 978).

Titles		Source
"Archon of the Iberians"	(Greek: ὁ τῶν Ἰβήρων ἄρχων)	John Skylitzes
"Magistros"	(Greek: Greek: μάγιστρος)	Georgian inscriptions at Oshki (963–973)
"Kouropalates"	(Greek: κουροπαλάτης; Arabic: qurubalāṭ)	Nikephoros Ouranos; Vita Ioannis et Euthymii hiberica; Yahya of Antioch
"King of Georgia, Lord of the city of Tayk"	(Arabic: malik al-Ǧurzīya ṣāḥib madīnat at-Tay)	Yahya of Antioch
"King of the Georgians"	(Armenian: թագավոր Վրաց, t‘agawor Vrac‘)	Aristakes Lastivertsi
"Kouropalates of Tayk"	(Armenian: կիւրապաղատ Տայոց, kiwrapałat Tayoc‘)	Stepanos Taronetsi (Asoghik)
"King of Tayk"	(Armenian: Թագաւոր Տայոց, T‘agawor Tayoc‘)	Armenian redaction of Kartlis Tskhovreba

=== Borders of the Kouropalatate ===
Like his predecessors, David ruled in Tayk, centered around the Olti region. Armenian historians referred to him as the Prince of Tayk or Kouropalates. According to Kartlis Tskhovreba, David's dominion encompassed Basean, Tayk, and the adjacent territories.

According to Emperor Constantine Porphyrogenitus, four principalities bordered the domains of the kouropalates: Berdzaokh, Karnatatis, Kuel, and Achara. Rather than falling under the direct jurisdiction of the kouropalates, these principalities were recognized as autonomous entities that maintained direct diplomatic ties with the Byzantine court.

- Achara corresponded to modern-day Adjara, situated in the basin of the homonymous river.
- Kuel was the Georgian fortress of Kvelistsikhe. Along with the Achara valley, this stronghold belonged to Gurgen Magistros, who exchanged it for Artanuj.
- Karnatatis was Karni-Tays, meaning the "Gates of Tayk". It lay on the border between Tayk and Klarjeti, near a mountain pass at an elevation of 2,520 meters. Karni-Tays (Lower Tayk) comprised part of Klarjeti and the Imerkhevi River valley, including the fortress of Artanuj.
- Berdzaokh (Armenian: Վերին աշխարհ lit. "Upper Land"; Georgian: Zena-Sopeli) encompassed the territory stretching eastward from Samtskhe and Javakheti along the Kura River as far as Tiflis.

South of the Karni-Tays line lay the core domains of the kouropalates, covering the entire basin of the Olti River—nearly the whole province of Tayk. According to the Ashkharhatsuyts, Tayk consisted of eight cantons: Kogh, Berdats por, Partizats por, Chakatk, Boghkha, Vokaghe, Azordats por, and Arsyats por. Located beyond the Kura in the Arsiani Mountains, Arsyats por remained outside the dominion of the kouropalates. The canton of Chakatk, bordering Vanand, belonged to the Armenian Bagratids, whereas the northern portion of Basean in the Aras valley was held by the kouropalates.

The initial center of the Georgian Bagratids was Klarjeti. Ashot Kouropalates established himself in Klarjeti, rebuilt Artanuj, expanded his holdings as far as Shavsheti and Tiflis (including Javakheti), and received the title of kouropalates from the Byzantine emperor. Ashot divided his lands between his two sons: Adarnase (the Mampali line, ruling Klarjeti, Shavsheti, and Achara) and Bagrat (the Kouropalates line, ruling the districts between Klarjeti and Tiflis, as well as Lower Tayk). Throughout the ninth and early tenth centuries, up until the death of the Armenian king Smbat I in 914, Tayk proper remained largely in the hands of the Armenian Bagratids (Ashot Msaker, Shapuh, Ashot of Sper, and the young prince Grigor). Subsequently, however, having lost control over Kartli under pressure from the Abkhazian and Armenian kingdoms to the east, the Kouropalates house expanded its borders southward into Tayk. Ashot Kouropalates's great-grandson Adarnase—crowned King of the Georgians by Smbat I in 899—was the first to cross the Gates of Tayk, constructing the cathedral and fortress of Banak (Bana) in the region. Following the death of Smbat I, Adarnase and his successors brought all of Tayk under their rule and contested Basean with Byzantium.

=== Alliance with the Byzantine Empire ===
In order to enact his ambitious plans, David had to secure his independence from the Byzantine Empire, which would reach its greatest height under the emperor Basil II (r. 976–1025).

The Byzantines' eastern neighbors – the fragmented Armenian and Georgian principalities – rarely threatened the empire directly, but were of particular interest to Constantinople as they controlled strategic international trade routes that ran through their domains. The Byzantines had already annexed the Armenian principalities of Taron (966) and Manzikert (968) and posed a potential danger to the constellation of several Georgian Bagratid principalities known as Tao-Klarjeti. However, the integrity of the empire itself was under serious threat after a full-scale rebellion, led by Bardas Skleros, broke out in 976. Following a series of successful battles the rebels swept across Asia Minor and threatened Constantinople itself. In the urgency of the situation, the young emperor Basil requested aid from David of Tao, who promptly responded and sent 12,000 first-rate cavalry troops under the command of Tornikios (Tornike) and Jojik (Zuzik) to reinforce the recently defeated loyal Byzantine general Bardas Phokas, thereby contributing to the decisive loyalist victory at the Battle of Pankalia near Caesarea on 24 March 979, after which Skleros fled to the Arabs. In connection with these events, the Armenian historian Asoghik (Taronetsi) already refers to David as kouropalates, whereas the Byzantine chronicler George Kedrenos styles him archon (though Kedrenos likewise calls him kouropalates when discussing his estate).

David's reward was the lifetime rule of key imperial territories in eastern Asia Minor, known to the contemporary Georgian sources as the "Upper Lands of Greece" (ზემონი ქუეყანანი საბერძნეთისანი), consisting chiefly of northwestern Armenian lands: the city of Theodosiopolis or Karin (Geo. Karnu-kalaki, present-day Erzurum, Turkey), Phasiane, Hark (now Muş Province), Apahunik, Mardali (Mardaghi), Khaldoyarich, and Chormayri. On this occasion, he was granted the high Byzantine court title of kouropalates. Basil II also rewarded the valor of David's commander Tornikios by funding a Georgian Orthodox monastery on Mount Athos. Although populated now chiefly with Greek monks, it is to this day known as Iviron, "of the Iberians (i.e. Georgians)". According to the hagiographies of the Georgian monks John the Iberian and Euthymius the Athonite, Emperor Basil II ceded several border territories to David Kuropalates in reward for his assistance in 979. The terms of the grant were unfavorable to David, who intended to incorporate the granted lands permanently into his realm, whereas under the agreement they were to revert to the Byzantine Empire upon his death.

These formidable acquisitions made David the most influential ruler in the Caucasus, enabling him to interfere in and arbitrate dynastic disputes in both Georgia and Armenia. The medieval Georgian authors call him "greatest of all the kings of Tao" and the eleventh-century Armenian chronicler Aristakes Lastivertsi describes him as:

a mighty man, a builder of the world, very honorable, a lover of the poor, indeed, the definition of peace. For in his day it was as the prophecy states: everyone reposed under his vine and his fig tree.

Being in control of highly important commercial centers, his principality profited from taxing the major trading routes running through southwestern Caucasus and eastern Anatolia. David invested these revenues in extensive building projects: constructing towns, forts and churches, and promoting Georgian monastic communities and cultural activities both in Georgia and abroad.

=== David III's campaigns against the Muslims ===
After the reconciliation with the emperor and his kinsmen, David led a series of successful raids against the Muslim emirates of Lake Van and Azerbaijan and against the Emirate of Tbilisi. Bagrat II of Georgia (grandfather of Bagrat, David's adoptee), and Gagik I of Armenia allied themselves with David, who recaptured Manzikert from the Marwanid emir of Diyar Bakr in about 993 and raided Akhlat, another important stronghold of this Kurdish dynasty, in 997. Mamlan, the Rawadid emir of Azarbaijan, was also twice defeated, the second time decisively, in 998, near Archesh.

In 991, Badh, the Kurdish ruler of Manzikert, died and was succeeded by his nephew, Abu Ali al-Hasan ibn Marwan. David immediately marched on Manzikert and captured the city, sparking a protracted conflict with the Muslim emirs. The Marwanids were reinforced by the emir Mamlan, son of Abu'l-Hayja, the Rawadid ruler of Adharbayjan. David was joined in alliance by the Christian kings Gagik I, Gagik of Kars, and Bagrat of Georgia. The opposing armies met near the town of Vagharshakert in Bagrevand (sometime between 991 and 994), where the Muslim forces retreated.

Ibn al-Athir records that in 992–993 the Byzantine emperor entered Armenia, laid siege to Khlat, Manzikert, and Archesh, and withdrew after concluding a ten-year truce with Abu Ali al-Hasan ibn Marwan. Nicholas Adontz noted that Arab historians were in fact referring here to the campaign of David Kuropalates, viewing him as the emperor's representative.

After the assassination of Abu Ali al-Hasan in Amid in 997, his brother and successor, Mumahhid al-Dawla, broke the truce. In a battle fought near Khlat on 17 April 998, David's forces suffered heavy casualties and retreated. Tornike's nephew, Bagrat Magistros, fell on the battlefield, while the ishkhanats ishkhan ("prince of princes") Bakur and numerous other nobles were taken captive. Later in 998, David fought his final major engagement against Emir Mamlan of Adharbayjan, who had invaded Armenia with a large army intending to conquer Armenia and Georgia and ravage Tayk in retaliation for the capture of Manzikert. David fielded his own troops alongside the combined forces of his allies—the kings of Ani, Kars, and Georgia. The battle took place near the village of Tsumb (Tsmro) in the canton of Apahunik, where the Muslim advance was halted and Manzikert remained under David's control.

The great Kouropalates David surpassed all the rulers of our time in his compassion and love of peace. David established peace and uprightness across all the eastern lands, particularly in Armenia and Georgia. He brought an end to the ceaseless wars that continually erupted and triumphed over all the surrounding peoples.

— Stepanos Asoghik, quoted in Berdzenishvili

=== Intervention in the affairs of Armenia and Georgia ===
In 977, when King Mushegh of Kars seized the fortress of Shatik, which belonged to King Smbat II of Ani, David intervened to restore justice and compelled Mushegh to return the stronghold.

In 988, David entered into an armed confrontation with King Bagrat III of the Abkhazians and his father, Gurgen. The episode is recorded in two main traditions. In his history, Asoghik states that the conflict arose because Bagrat's grandfather, Bagrat Regveni ("the Simple"), sought to disinherit his son Gurgen, prompting the latter to appeal to David. David requested assistance from King Smbat II of Ani, who led his forces alongside his brother Gagik I, King Abas of Kars, and the princes of Syunik and Albania. Following a battle near the village of Dlivek in Javakheti, his adversaries sued for peace and withdrew; in reward for his aid, Smbat II received the fortress of Lakuret (Skviret).

Kartlis Tskhovreba recounts this confrontation with different details. According to the Georgian chronicle, the incident was triggered by Rati, the duke of Trialeti, Manglisi, and Skviret, who refused to submit to King Bagrat III of Abkhazia. When Bagrat marched against the recalcitrant noble, David Kuropalates was led to believe that the expedition was directed against him. While Bagrat's father Gurgen hastened to his son's aid, David rallied the kings of Armenia. King Bagrat Regveni of Kartli also sided with David, fearing that his son Gurgen might depose him. Gurgen was defeated and forced to retreat at the Battle of Dlivek, and Bagrat III, recognizing the superiority of David's forces, appeared before him in person to sue for peace and assure him that his sole intention had been to punish Rati. Peace was restored, although Bagrat nevertheless ousted Duke Rati shortly thereafter.

=== Death ===
The date of David's death is given differently in the sources. The Georgian Chronicles maintain that he died in 1001, while several Armenian and Muslim accounts suggest 1000. Aristakes gives 28 March 1001, closely corroborated by Asoghik, who says David died on the Easter day of the year 449 of the Armenian calendar, i.e., 31 March 1001. Another Armenian chronicler, Samuel Anetsi, also puts the date as 1001. Modern scholarship therefore usually gives 1000/1001.

==== Accounts of his death ====
Several accounts surround the ruler's mysterious death. In his History of the Byzantine Empire, Fyodor Uspensky notes that Archbishop Hilarion administered poison to David during Holy Communion. Aristakes Lastivertsi, states that the regicide was carried out by the Georgian ruler's own nobles, who mixed poison into the communion chalice and subsequently strangled their sovereign.

The Armenian historian Matthew of Edessa names the Georgian archbishop Hilarion as the principal culprit:

Some years later, certain prominent men plotted evil against the just and pious Prince David, intending to put him to death. Those malicious nobles were like Cain and the other murderers. Moreover, they persuaded Hilarion, the Archbishop of the Georgians, to join their sinister conspiracy. This Hilarion crucified God a second time, for he mixed poison into the life-giving body and blood of Christ, thereby turning the source of all life into a source of death. Having celebrated the fatal liturgy in the church, in the presence of God, he placed the portion of communion laced with deadly poison into the mouth of the righteous prince. Sensing what had happened, the pious Prince David said nothing, but took an antidote and relieved the pain in his body. Yet the wicked Bishop Hilarion persisted in his diabolical design and entered the prince's bedchamber while the pious David was fast asleep. Taking the pillow from beneath his head, he pressed it over David's mouth and, throwing his weight upon him, the archbishop mercilessly smothered the righteous kouropalates to death. A few years later, Emperor Basil seized the wicked Bishop Hilarion, bound a heavy stone around his neck, and cast him into the sea, along with the other prominent men who had conspired with him. Thus perished those men, who were unquestionably worthy of every curse, for the Kouropalates David bore the patronymic of Emperor Basil, and for that reason Basil put those men to death.

— Matthew of Edessa, Chronicle

== Legacy ==
Reverse of a silver coin of David III Kouropalates depicting a potent cross on a four-stepped base, flanked by four Asomtavruli letters reading ႩႮႲႨ (Kouropalates).

David is remembered as a zealous patron of both Georgian and Armenian scholarship and education. At his initiative, St. Euthymius the Georgian translated numerous manuscripts from Greek on Mount Athos and sent them to Georgia. Several monumental churches constructed during the reign of David III remain standing in historical southern Georgia (modern northeastern Turkey) to this day.

Coins minted by David in imitation of the Byzantine coinage of Basil II and John I Tzimiskes have survived to the present day.

David assembled the nobles (aznauris) of Kartli and declared:

He [Bagrat] is the hereditary ruler of Tayk, Kartli, and Abkhazia—my son and fosterling—and I am his regent (mouravi) and helper; let all of you obey him!

Bagrat's hereditary claims—Iberia and the Kouropalatate of Tayk through his father, and Abkhazia through his mother—have already been noted above. David's adoption of Bagrat added Tao to this inheritance and laid the foundation for a united Georgian kingdom. In 975, three years before the death of Theodosius III, David invited King Smbat II of Armenia to accompany him, Bagrat, and Queen Gurandukht to Kutaisi, where Bagrat was solemnly anointed as King Bagrat III of Abkhazia.

[Bagrat] governed and ordered all affairs like his grandfather, the great King George, and perhaps even better, for in his conduct he emulated in every way his mentor, the great King David Kouropalates, resolving all good works just as he did.

No one contested Bagrat's claims, not even the rebellious Liparitid clan, which over the course of several centuries caused recurring turmoil for the Bagrationis and their kingdom.

Bagrat III continued to expand the kingdom and suppress separatist nobility, including eliminating his paternal cousins so that no rival Bagrationi claimant could ever challenge the Georgian throne.

=== Issue of succession ===
Having no children of his own, David adopted his kinsman, the young prince Bagrat, heir to the Bagratid throne of Kartli (Iberia). He did so at the request of the energetic Georgian nobleman Iovane Marushis-dze. In 975, David designated Bagrat III as his heir; Bagrat would later become the first king of a united Georgia. Through his fortunate bloodlines Bagrat was destined to sit upon two thrones. Furthermore, through his mother Gurandukht, sister of the childless Abkhazian king Theodosius III, Bagrat was a potential heir to the realm of Abkhazia. Making a plan for the creation of an all-Georgian state, David occupied Kartli for his foster-son in 976 and repulsed the troops from the easternmost Georgian Kingdom of Kakheti, which had recently occupied the western sector of Kartli with its rock-hewn city of Uplistsikhe. Two years later, in 978, David and Marushis-dze secured the crown of Abkhazia for Bagrat by displacing Theodosius III.

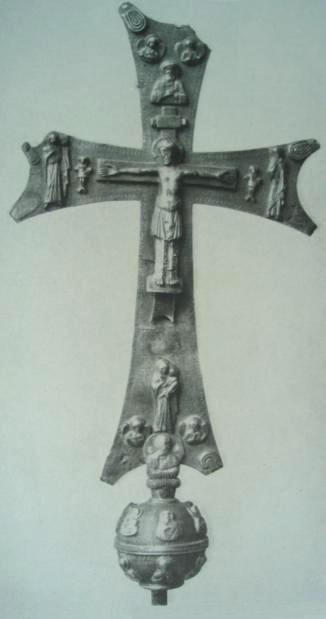
A processional cross of David of Tao by the goldsmith Asat

David's good fortunes changed in 987 when he, anxious to make his extensive possessions a hereditary Bagratid domain, joined his long-time friend Bardas Phokas in a rebellion against the emperor Basil, likely having received a promise from Phokas that the territories would be recognized as his hereditary possession. Once the rebels were defeated by the Byzantine-Rus' forces in 989, Basil dispatched a strong force under John of Chaldea to punish the Georgians, and David had to submit. Reconciled with the emperor, he was granted, in c. 990, the title of kuropalates again in return for his promise that upon his death the lands previously placed under his sovereignty would revert to the Byzantine Empire. Seeing no way out of his predicament, David bequeathed all his domains and principality to the emperor, likely seeking to buy time and spare his country from devastation. According to Adontz, David and his court viewed this forced concession as a temporary expedient to appease the emperor's wrath, as it was precisely after 991 that David embarked on a large-scale expansionist campaign against neighboring Muslim emirates.

The 988 confrontation with Bagrat and Gurgen, often associated with Duke Rati of Kldekari, is treated below under “Intervention in the affairs of Armenia and Georgia.”

=== Wars of the Kuropalates’ succession ===
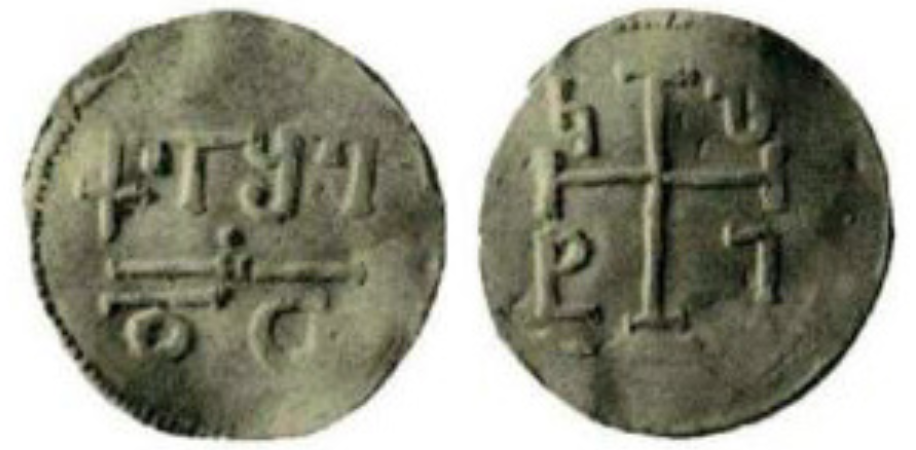
Coin of David III, dated 10th century. The obverse presents an abbreviated legend in Asomtavruli script reading “Christ, forgive David” (ႵႤႸႤႣႧ). The reverse celebrates David's esteemed Byzantine honorific, curopalates (ႩႮႲႨ), each letter having been placed in one of the four fields of the central cross.

Basil II was at that time in the eastern provinces of his empire, wintering on the plain of Tarsus following his campaign against the Fatimid dynasty in Syria. On hearing of David's death he marched north-eastward to claim the lands David had promised to the emperor. The local Georgian and Armenian nobility submitted without any serious resistance. The only notable incident occurred when a quarrel between a Georgian soldier and a Varangian Guardsman over a bale of hay developed into a major fight, involving 6,000 Varangians and taking the lives of thirty Georgian high-ranking nobles.

King Bagrat, David's foster-son, met with Basil but, unable to prevent the annexation of David's realm, had to recognize the new borders in reward of the imperial title of kouropalates. Despite this setback, Bagrat was able to become the first king of an all-Georgian unified monarchy, a result made possible largely by the efforts of David of Tao, who, as the modern scholar Stephen Rapp puts it, "appropriately ranks high on any 'Top Ten' list of Georgian history."

There is some disagreement among modern scholars on whether David ceded to the Byzantines only those lands which had been granted to him as a reward for his assistance against the rebel Bardas Skleros, or if it had been the whole of his principality that was acquired by Basil II. As the former was endowed upon David for lifetime stewardship, it would be more reasonable to assume that he conceded his entire realm, i.e., Thither Tao/Tayk and the adjacent Armenian counties up to Lake Van. Whatever the extent of David's domain, the Georgian kings would not so easily reconcile with the loss of those territories, leading to a series of conflicts with the Byzantine Empire in the eleventh century.

Genealogy of the Bagrationi dynasty of Tao-Klarjeti

Ashot I Kouropalates d. c. 826/830; Prince of Iberia r. 813–830
Adarnase II d. c. 870; Co-ruler of Tao-Klarjeti r. 830–867	Bagrat I d. 876; Co-ruler of Tao-Klarjeti r. 830–876	Guaram Mampali d. 882; Co-ruler of Tao-Klarjeti r. 830–881
Gurgen I Grand Duke of Tao r. 881–891	Ashot the Beautiful (d. 867)	Sumbat I Grand Duke of Klarjeti r. 870–889	Adarnase	David I d. 881; Prince of Iberia r. 876–881	Ashot	Nasra (d. 888)
Ashot the Immature; Grand Duke of Tao r. 908–918	Adarnase III; Grand Duke of Tao r. 891–896	Bagrat I Grand Duke of Klarjeti r. 889–900	David I Grand Duke of Klarjeti r. 900–943	Adarnase IV d. 923; Prince of Iberia r. 881–888; King of the Iberians r. 888–923
David; Grand Duke of Tao r. 896–908	Gurgen; Grand Duke of Tao r. 918–941	Dinar; Queen of Hereti	Adarnase II of Klarjeti d. 945	Ashot the Swift d. 939	David (d. 908)	Gurgen I d. 923	Sumbat II d. 988; Grand Duke of Klarjeti r. 961–966	David II; King of the Iberians r. 923–937	Bagrat I Grand Duke of Tao r. 941–945	Sumbat I King of the Iberians r. 954–958	Ashot II; Grand Duke of Tao r. 937–954
Bagrat (d. 922)	Gurgen (d. 968)	David II; Grand Duke of Klarjeti r. 988–993	Bagrat II (d. 988)	Adarnase V Grand Duke of Tao r. 945–961	Adarnase IV (d. 983)	Bagrat II; King of the Iberians r. 958–994
Gurgen; Grand Duke of Klarjeti r. 993–1011	Sumbat III; Grand Duke of Klarjeti r. 993–1011	David III; Grand Duke of Tao r. 966–1001	Bagrat II; Grand Duke of Tao r. 961–966	Gurgen; King of the Iberians r. 994–1008
Demetrius (d. 1028)	Bagrat III of Klarjeti (d. 1028)	Bagrat III c. 960 – c. 1014; King of Abkhazia r. 978–1014; King of Georgia r. 1008–1014

Preceded by Adarnase	Prince of Tao; 966–1000/1001	Succeeded by Byzantine takeover
Preceded by -	Kuropalates of Iberia; 978–1000/1001	Succeeded by Bagrat III
