= Bagrat =

Bagrat Բագրատ ბაგრატი
- Gender: Male
- Language: Armenian, Georgian

Origin
- Meaning: Old Persian Bagadāta, "gift of God"

Bagrat (Armenian: Բագրատ, in Western Armenian pronounced as Pakrad, Georgian: ბაგრატ) is a male name popular in Armenia. It is derived from the Old Persian Bagadāta, "gift of God".

The names of the Armenian Bagratuni and Georgian Bagrationi dynasties (literally, "the house of/established by Bagrat") are derived from the name.

== Georgian monarchs ==
- Bagrat I of Iberia, Georgian prince
- Bagrat of Mukhrani, Georgian prince
- Bagrat I of Abkhazia, Georgian king
- Bagrat I of Tao, Georgian prince
- Bagrat I of Klarjeti, Georgian prince
- Bagrat I of Imereti, Georgian king
- Bagrat II of Iberia, Georgian king
- Bagrat II of Tao, Georgian prince
- Bagrat II of Klarjeti, Georgian prince
- Bagrat III of Georgia, Georgian king
- Bagrat III of Imereti, Georgian king
- Bagrat III of Klarjeti, Georgian prince
- Bagrat (son of Prince Teimuraz of Imereti), Georgian king
- Bagrat IV of Georgia, Georgian king
- Bagrat IV of Imereti, Georgian king
- Bagrat V of Georgia, Georgian king
- Bagrat VI, Georgian king
- Bagrat VII, Georgian king

== Others ==
- Bagrat Asatryan, Armenian banker and economist
- Bagrat Galstanyan, Armenian theologian and a cleric of the Armenian Apostolic Church
- Bagrat Ioannisiani, Soviet telescope designer and Armenian descent
- Bagrat Oghanian, Armenian boxer
- Bagrat Shinkuba, Abkhaz writer, poet, historian, linguist and politician
- Bagrat Ulubabyan, Armenian writer and historian
- Bagrat de Bagration y de Baviera, Prince of Georgia, Grandee of Spain
- Prince Bagrat of Georgia, son of George XII of Georgia
- Bagrat of Ravendel, Ruler of Ravendel until 1116

== See also ==
- Bagrati Cathedral
- Prince Bagrat of Imereti
