= Smbat =

Smbat, Sambat, Smpad, Sumbat or Sempad is an Armenian and Georgian masculine given name. It may refer to:

== Bagratuni nobles ==
- Smbat IV Bagratuni (died 616/7), Armenian noble in Byzantine and Sasanian service, marzpan of Hyrcania and Armenia
- Smbat VI Bagratuni (670–726), presiding prince of Armenia
- Smbat VII Bagratuni (died 775), presiding prince of Armenia
- Smbat VIII Bagratuni, 9th-century Armenian noble

== Kings of Armenia ==
- Smbat I (850–912/914), Smbat the Martyr, king of Armenia from 890 to 912
- Smbat II (died 989), king of Armenia from 977 to 989
- Smbat III (died 1042), king of Armenia from 1020 to 1040. Also known as Hovhannes-Smbat of Ani
- Sempad the Constable (1208–1276), noble in the Armenian Kingdom of Cilicia. Diplomat, judge, historian and military commander, brother of King Hetoum I
- Sempad, King of Armenia (1277–1310), king of the Armenian Kingdom of Cilicia from 1296 to 1298
- Smbat Artsruni (died 1471), last Armenian king
- Sempad Thor'netsi, 10th-century Armenian king

== Kings of Georgia ==
- Sumbat I of Klarjeti (died 899), Georgian prince and monarch
- Sumbat I of Iberia (died 958), Georgian prince and monarch
- Sumbat II of Klarjeti (died 988), Georgian prince and monarch
- Sumbat III of Klarjeti (died 1011), Georgian prince and monarch

== Given name ==
- Smbat Baroyan (1875–1956), Armenian fedayee commander during the Armenian national movement
- Sumbat Davitis Dze, 11th-century Georgian chronicler
- Sumbat Der Kiureghian (1913–1999), Armenian Iranian artist
- Smbat Lputian (born 1958), Armenian chess grandmaster
- Smbat Margaryan (born 1993), Armenian weightlifter
- Smpad Piurad (1862–1915), Armenian writer, intellectual, publisher and activist
- Sumbat Saakian (1951–1993), Georgian politician
- Smbat Shahaziz (1840–1908), Armenian poet, educator and publicist

== See also ==
- Sambat (Greek: Σαμβατάς) is sometimes considered to have been used as the Khazar name for Kyiv
- Sam Bat, a Canadian manufacturer of baseball bats
- Smbataberd, medieval fortress in Armenia
- Smbat Walls, a historical fortification in Armenia
- Killing of Smbat Tsakanyan, 2014 murder in Nagorno-Karabakh
- Symbatios (disambiguation)
