= Great Turkish Invasion =

1080s invasions of Georgia

- Part of the Georgian–Seljuk wars & Byzantine–Seljuk wars
Date	1080
Location	Kingdom of Georgia, Middle East & East Anatolia.
Result	Seljuk victory; The rise of the Seljuk Empire as a great power.; Turkification of Anatolia, Azerbaijan and northwestern Iran.; Expanding Turkish culture and language in the Middle East and the Caucasus.
Territorial changes	Caucasus and Middle East under Seljuk Empire rule

Belligerents
Kingdom of Georgia; Byzantine Empire	Seljuk Empire

Commanders and leaders
George II of Georgia	Malik Shah I

In Georgian historiography, the Great Turkish Invasion, also translated as the Great Turkish Troubles (Georgian: დიდი თურქობა, romanized: didi turkoba), refers to the continuous attacks and settlement of the Seljuq-led Turkic tribes in the Georgian lands during the reign of George II in the 1080s. The term has its origin in the 12th-century Georgian chronicle and is accepted in the modern scholarship of Georgia. The Seljuq invasions resulted in a severe crisis in the kingdom of Georgia, leaving several of its provinces depopulated and weakening the royal authority, until the tide was reversed by the military victories of King David IV (r. 1089–1125).

== Background ==
The Seljuks made their first appearances in Georgia in the 1060s, when the Sultan Alp Arslan laid waste to the south-western provinces of the Georgian kingdom and reduced Kakheti. These intruders were part of the same wave of the Turkish movement which inflicted a crushing defeat on the Byzantine army at Manzikert in 1071. Although the Georgians were able to recover from Alp Arslan's invasion, the Byzantine withdrawal from Anatolia brought them in more direct contact with the Seljuks. In the 1070s, Georgia was twice attacked by the Sultan Malik Shah I, but the Georgian King George II was still able to fight back at times.

== Invasion ==
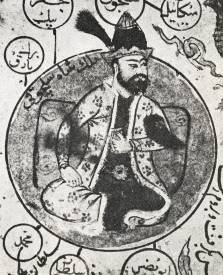
Sultan Malik Shah

In 1080, George II was surprised, in the vicinity of Queli, by a large Turkish force led by Aḥmad, probably of the Mamlān dynasty, whom the Georgian chronicle calls "a powerful emir and strong archer". George was put to flight, through Adjara, to Abkhazia. The Turks conquered Kars from the Georgians and returned to their bases laden with wealth This was soon followed by even larger inroads, led by Yaʿqub and ʿIsā-Böri. On June 24, 1080, the half-nomadic Turks began to arrive en masse in the southern provinces of Georgia, quickly moving deeper into the country and overrunning Asispori, Klarjeti, Shavsheti, Adjara, Samtskhe, Kartli, Argueti, Samokalako, and Chqondidi. The key towns of Kutaisi and Artanuji and the vibrant Christian hermitages of Klarjeti were all burnt down. Those who survived the fighting had to flee to the mountains, where many of them found their death of cold and starvation.

Watching his kingdom being destroyed, George II, in despair, repaired to Isfahan, to Malik Shah, who treated the Georgian monarch with much consideration and promised security from the nomads in exchange of a tribute (kharaj).

== Results ==
Map of the Caucasus c. 1090

George's acceptance of the Seljuq suzerainty did not bring a real peace for Georgia. The Turks continued their seasonal movement into the Georgian territory to make use of the rich herbage of the Kura valley and the Seljuq garrisons occupied the key fortresses in Georgia's south. These inroads and settlements had a ruinous effect on Georgia's economic and political order. Cultivated lands were turned into pastures for the nomads and peasant farmers were compelled to seek safety in the mountains. The contemporary Georgian chronicler laments that "in those times there was neither sowing nor harvest. The land was ruined and turned into forest; in place of men beasts and animals of the field made their dwelling there. Insufferable oppression fell on all the inhabitants of the land; it was unparalleled and far worse than all ravages heard of or experienced." A similar situation was found in neighboring Armenia as related in Aristakes Lastivertsi's chronicle. To make the things worse, a severe earthquake struck the southern provinces of Georgia, devastating Tmogvi and the surrounding area on April 16, 1088.

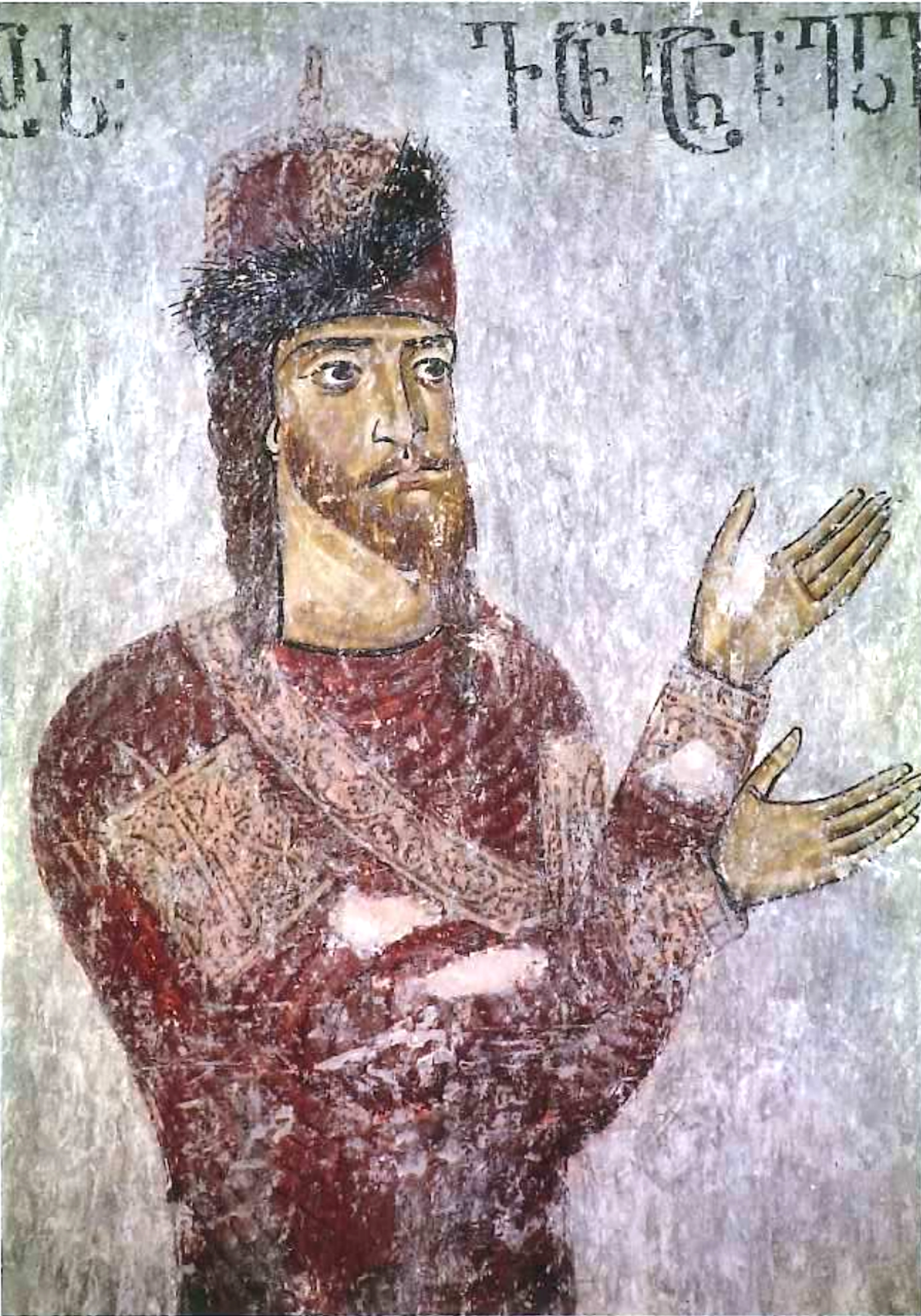
Donor figure wearing sharbush, qaba and tiraz. Church of the Archangels, Zemo-Krikhi, Racha, northern Georgia. 11th century, Inv. No. 03086-75.

The great nobles of Georgia capitalized on weakening of the royal power to promote their autonomy. George II attempted to make use of Malik Shah's favor to bend Aghsartan I, the recalcitrant king of Kakheti in eastern Georgia, into submission, but failed to achieve any result due largely to his contradictory actions. Aghsartan was able to outplay him by offering submission to Malik Shah and buy security by converting to Islam.

== Aftermath ==
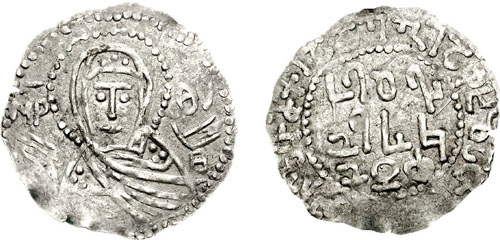
Coin of George II, 1081-1089

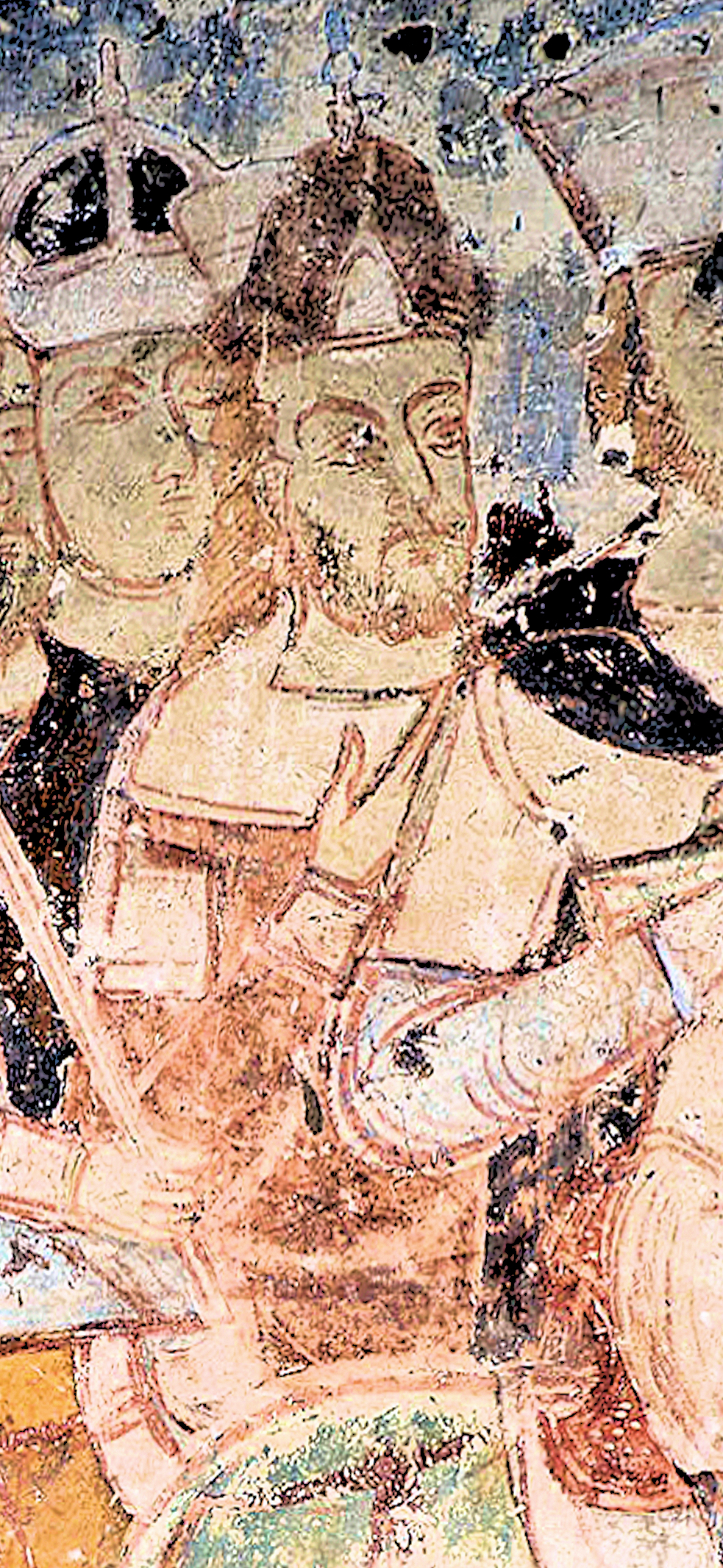
Costume of a King of the Georgian royal court in the period circa 1215. St Gregory of Tigran Honents.

Such was the situation in Georgia, when, in 1089, George II chose to put the crown—or was forced to do so by his nobles—on the head of his 16-year-old son David IV. This energetic young ruler was able to capitalize on the disorder in the Seljuq empire following Malik Shah's death in 1092 and the arrival of the First Crusade in the Middle East in 1096 and embarked on a systematic campaign aimed at curbing the aristocratic opposition and expelling the Seljuqs from his kingdom. By 1099, the year when Jerusalem fell to the Crusaders, David felt strong enough to withhold annual tribute paid to the Seljuqs. A string of military successes over the regional successors of the Seljuq empire was concluded by a major victory over the Muslim armies at Didgori in 1121, which made the Georgian kingdom a formidable power in the Caucasus and East Anatolia.

== Bibliography ==
- Allen, W.E.D. (1932). A history of the Georgian people; from the beginning down to the Russian conquest in the nineteenth century. London: Routledge & K. Paul. ISBN 0-7100-6959-6.
- Eastmond, Antony (1998). Royal imagery in medieval Georgia. University Park, Pa.: Pennsylvania State University Press. ISBN 0271016280.
- Lordkipanidze, Mariam (1987). Georgia in the XI-XII Centuries. Tbilisi: Ganatleba. OCLC 976720564.
- Peacock, Andrew (2006). "Georgia and the Anatolian Turks in the 12th and 13th centuries". Anatolian Studies. 56: 127–146. doi:10.1017/S0066154600000806. JSTOR 20065551. S2CID 155798755.
- Suny, Ronald Grigor (1994). The making of the Georgian nation (2. ed.). Bloomington: Indiana Univ. Press. ISBN 0253209153.
- Thomson, Robert W. (1996). Rewriting Caucasian history: the medieval Armenian adaptation of the Georgian chronicles; the original Georgian texts and the Armenian adaptation. Oxford: Clarendon Press. ISBN 0198263732.
