= Bagrat I =

Bagrat I may refer to:

- Bagrat I of Iberia, Prince in 830–876
- Bagrat I of Abkhazia, King in 887–898/899
- Bagrat I of Klarjeti (died in 900)
- Bagrat I of Tao (died March 945)
- Bagrat I of Imereti, the Minor, King in 1329–1330
- Bagrat I, Prince of Mukhrani, Prince in 1512–1539
