= Ashot =

Ashot Աշոտ
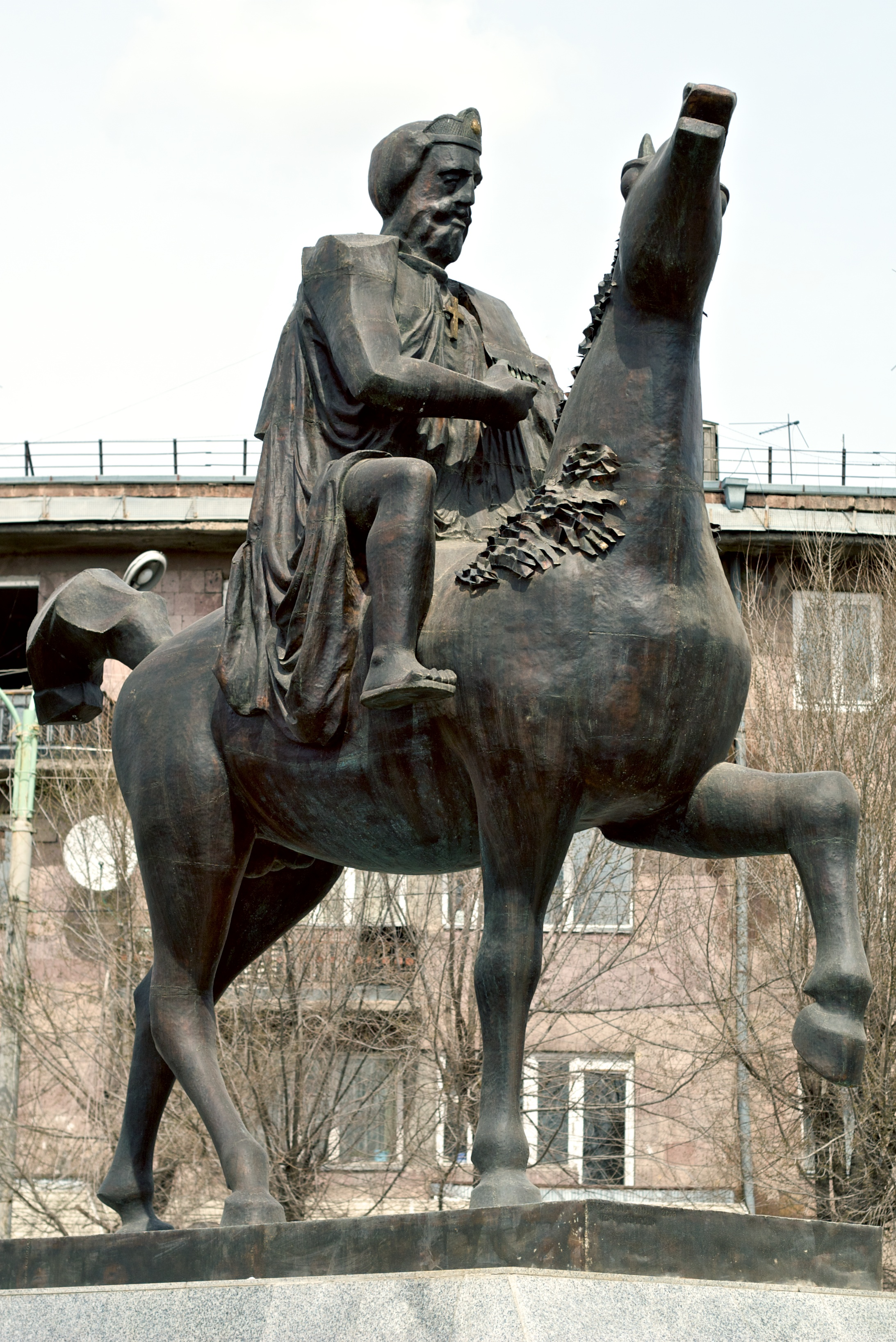
- Monument of Ashot III of Armenia
- Gender: Male
- Language: Armenian

Origin
- Origin: Middle Armenian
- Region of origin: Armenia

Ashot or Ashod (Armenian: Աշոտ) is an Armenian given name. Notable persons with the name include:

== Kings of the Bagratuni dynasty ==
- Ashot Msaker (Ashot the Carnivorous) (died 826), Armenian prince
- Ashot I of Armenia (Ashot the Great, 820–890), ruled 885–890
- Ashot II Yerkat (Ashot the Iron, died 929), ruled 914–929
- Ashot II Bagratuni, 7th-century Armenian monarch
- Ashot III Bagratuni (690–762), Armenian nobleman of the Bagratuni dynasty
- Ashot III Voghormats (Ashot the Merciful, died 977), ruled 953–977
- Ashot IV Qadj (Ashot the Brave), ruled 1021–1039/1040

== Kings of Tao-Klarjeti ==
- Ashot I of Iberia (Ashot I Kuropalates, died 830), King of Tao-Klarjeti
- Ashot II of Tao Kuropalates, King of Tao-Klarjeti 937–954
- Ashot the Immature (Kukhi), Eristavt Eristavi (died 918), King of Tao-Klarjeti
- Ashot the Swift (died 939), Georgian prince
- Ashot the Beautiful (died 867), Georgian prince

== Kings of Vaspurakan ==
- Ashot-Sahak of Vaspurakan (died 991)
- Derenik-Ashot of Vaspurakan (died 958/959)

== Other people ==
- Ashot ibn Shavur, Shaddadid ruler of Arran from 1068–69
- Ashot III of Taron (900–967), Armenian king of Taron
- Ashot G. Abrahamian (1903–1983), Soviet Armenian historian
- Ashot Adamyan (born 1953), Armenian actor
- Ashot Anastasian (1964–2016), Armenian chess Grandmaster
- Ashot Ariyan (born 1973), Armenian composer and pianist
- Ashot Arsenyan (born 1960), Armenian politician and businessman
- Ashot Avagyan (born 1958), Armenian artist
- Ashot Avedyan, 20th-century Iranian Armenian footballer
- Ashot Beglarian (born 1968), Armenian writer, journalist and translator
- Ashot Bleyan (born 1955), Armenian politician and educator
- Ashot Chilingarian (born 1949), Armenian physicist
- Ashot Danielyan (born 1974), Armenian weightlifter
- Ashot Danielyan (born 1984), Artsakhi politician
- Ashot Egiazaryan (born 1965), deputy of the State Duma of Russia
- Ashot Ghazaryan (born 1949), Armenian singer, showman, presenter and actor
- Ashot Ghulian (born 1965), Armenian politician
- Ashot Hovakimian (born 1961), Armenian diplomat
- Ashot Hovhannisian (1887–1992), Soviet Armenian communist, Marxist historian and theorist
- Ashot Karagyan (born 1951), Soviet Armenian fencer
- Ashot Karapetyan (born 1999), Armenian alpine skier
- Ashot Khachatryan (born 1959), Armenian football defender
- Ashot Khachaturyants (born 1968), Armenian Russian oil executive, football administrator and philanthropist
- Ashot Manucharyan (born 1954), Armenian politician and educator
- Ashot Melikjanyan (1952–2001), Soviet Armenian actor
- Ashot Melkonian (1930–2009), Armenian artist
- Ashot Melkonyan (born 1961), Armenian historian, professor and academic
- Ashot Mkhitaryan (1959–2010), Armenian weightlifting coach
- Ashot Nadanian (born 1972), Armenian chess player
- Ashot Navasardyan (1950–1997), Armenian politician, founder of the Republican Party of Armenia
- Ashot Petrosian (1950–1998), Soviet Armenian mathematician
- Ashot Potikyan (1946–2017), Russian Armenian snooker and Russian pyramid player
- Ashot Sahratyan (1936–2015), Russian Armenian poet, translator and artist
- Ashot Sarkisov (1924–2022), Russian nuclear scientist and engineer
- Ashot Satyan (1906–1958), Soviet Armenian composer and conductor
- Ashot Taronites, 10th-century Byzantine nobleman
- Ashot Ter-Matevosyan (born 1985), Armenian actor
- Ashot Voskanyan (born 1949), Armenian philosopher, diplomat and parliamentarian
- Ashot Yeghiazaryan (1943–2016), Armenian diplomat
- Ashot Yesayan (born 1951), Armenian politician
- Ashot Zorian (1905–1970), Turkish-born Egyptian painter and educator of Armenian ethnicity
- Ashot, Medieval Armenian architect, Caravanserai of Zor, E. Turkey, inscription reads, "Built by Ashot."
- Aramashot Papayan (1911–1998), Soviet Armenian playwright, screenwriter, actor and director
- Bekor Ashot (1959–1992), Armenian army officer

== See also ==
- Ashot Ashkelon, Israeli manufacturer
