= David Kuropalates =

David Kuropalates or Davit Kuropalati may refer to:

- David I of Iberia (876–881)
- David III of Tao (966–1000)
