= Bagrat of Tao =

Bagrat of Tao may refer to:

- Bagrat I of Tao (died 945), Georgian prince and son of Adarnase IV
- Bagrat II of Tao (died 966), Georgian prince and son of Adarnase II Kuropalates
