= Symbatios =

Symbatios or Symbatius (Greek: Συμβάτιος) is the Hellenized form of the Armenian name Smbat. It was particularly frequent in Byzantine times. People with this name include:

- Smbat IV Bagratuni, 6th-century Armenian general who served both Byzantium and Sassanid Persia
- birth name of Constantine, son and co-emperor of Leo V the Armenian
- Symbatios the Armenian, logothete and governor of the Thracesian Theme, rebel against Michael III in 866
- Symbatios the Great, Georgian ruler of Klarjeti in 870–899
