= Ashot I =

Ashot I may refer to:

- Ashot I of Armenia (c. 820–890), Armenian prince
- Ashot I of Iberia (died 826), presiding prince of Iberia (modern Georgia)
