= Bagrat II =

Bagrat II may refer to:

- Bagrat II of Iberia, King in 958–994
- Bagrat II of Tao (died in 966)
