= Adarnase IV =

Adarnase IV may refer to:

- Adarnase IV of Iberia (died 923)
- Adarnase V of Tao (died 961)
