= Cehennem Deresi Canyon =

- Cehennem Deresi Kanyonu
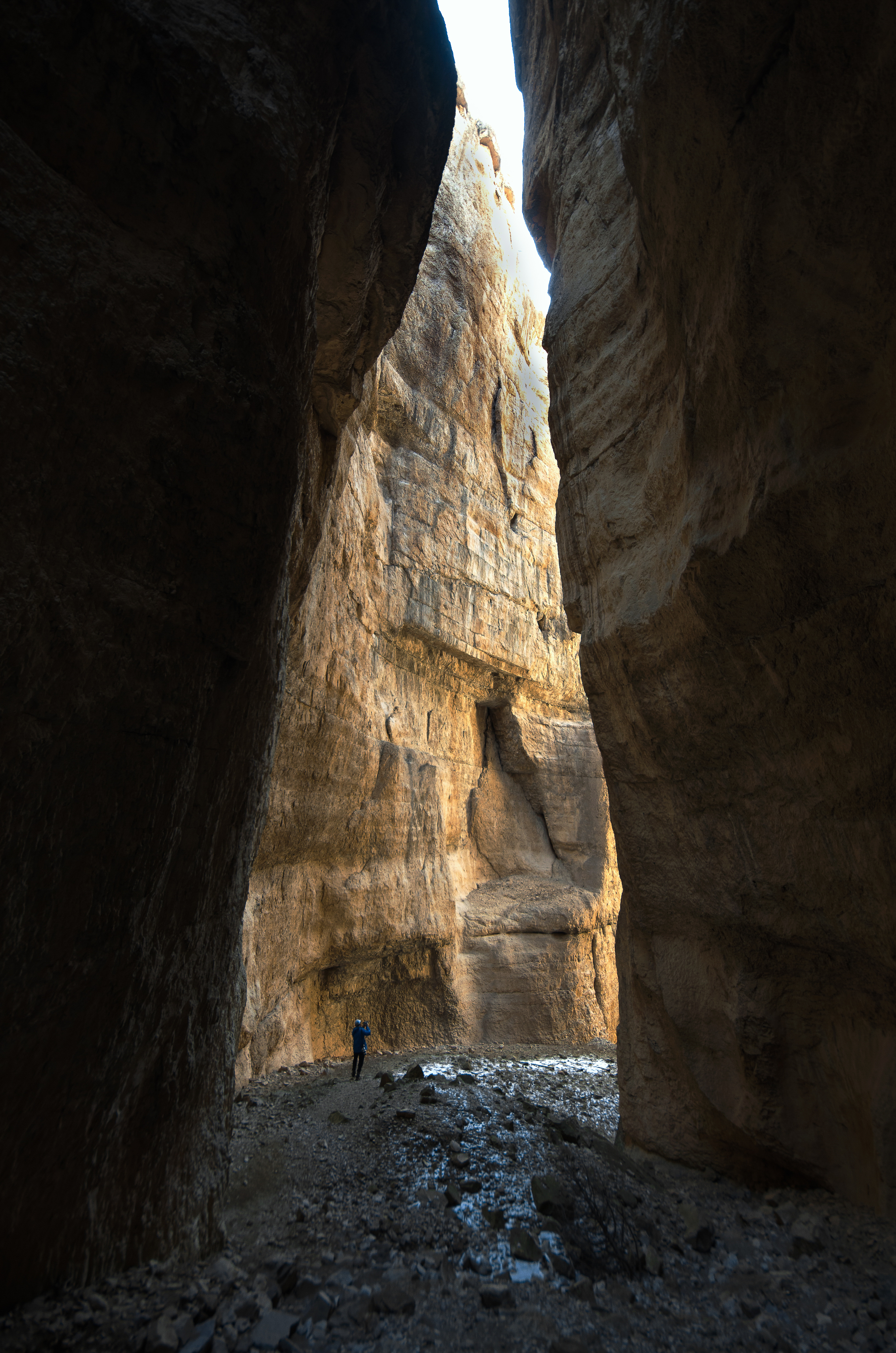
- View of inside the canyon

- Location within Turkey
- Length: 2.5 km (1.6 mi)
- Width: 70 m (230 ft)
- Depth: about 200 m (660 ft)

Geography
- Location: Ardanuç
- State/Province: Artvin Province, Turkey
- Coordinates: 41°07′59″N 42°02′58″E
- Interactive map of Cehennem Deresi Canyon

Cehennem Deresi Canyon (literally: Hell's Creek Canyon) is a canyon in Artvin Province, northeastern Turkey. It is among the country's longest canyons.

Cehennem Deresi Canyon is located in a distance of 7 km (4.3 mi) north to Ardanuç in Artvin Province in northeastern Turkey. The canyon is 2.5 km (1.6 mi) long, 70 m (230 ft) wide and about 2,080 m (6,820 ft) deep. It is one of the country's biggest canyons, and is among the deepest of its kind in the world. The entrance section of the canton is narrower than the rest. The canyon walls are quite steep. In the area of karstic terrain, geological formations like caves and sinkholes are found.

It is planned that this protected area of first degree will be declared a nature park, where various outdoor activities will be offered. The project is financially supported by the Eastern Blacksea Development Agency (Turkish: Doğu Karadeniz Kalkınma Ajansı, DOKA) with about ₺ 781,000 (approx. US$ 145,000). A glass-floor bridge of about 80 m (260 ft) length and 2.50 m (8 ft 2 in) width is being constructed to connect the two rims of the canyon.
