= Demetrius of Klarjeti =

Georgian prince

Prince Demetrius (died 1028) (Georgian: დემეტრე) was a Georgian prince of the Bagrationi dynasty from Klarjeti line. Demetrius is the only son of Gurgen of Klarjeti, who revolted around 1010 against King Bagrat III of Georgia and crowned himself as the King of Klarjeti, however in 1012, he was executed, while Demetrius survived by escaping to Constantinople where he received a Greek education. Returning to Georgia on the death of Bagrat III, in 1014, he managed to find a place in the high society of the kingdom and became the leader of the pro-Byzantine party of Georgia. Shortly after Bagrat IV's ascension to the throne, Constantine VIII sent in an army to take over the key city-fortress of Artanuji on behalf of the Georgian Bagratid prince Demetrius. Several Georgians nobles defected to the Byzantines, but Bagrat's loyal subjects put up a stubborn fight. The Byzantines overran the Georgian borderlands and besieged Kldekari, a key fortress in Trialeti province, but failed to take it and marched back on the region Shavsheti. The local bishop Saba of Tbeti organized a successful defense of the area forcing the Byzantines to retreat. Finally Bagrat IV manages to defeat Demetrius and imprisons him. The Georgian Chronicle states that he died during his captivity.

== Sources ==
- Cyrille Toumanoff, Les dynasties de la Caucasie chrétienne de l'Antiquité jusqu'au XIXe siècle : Tables généalogiques et chronologiques, Rome, 1990, p. 132-133.
