= Adarnase V of Tao =

Adarnase V ადარნასე V

Duke of Upper Tao
- Reign: 945 – 961
- Predecessor: Bagrat I
- Successor: Bagrat II
- Dynasty: Bagrationi
- Father: Bagrat I of Tao
- Religion: Eastern Orthodox Church

Adarnase V, sometimes rendered as Adarnase II or Adarnase IV, (Georgian: ადარნასე) (died 961) was a Georgian prince of the Bagratid dynasty of Tao-Klarjeti and hereditary ruler of Upper Tao with the Byzantine titles of magistros (945) and curopalates (958).

The name Adarnase derives from Middle Persian Ādurnarsēh, with the second component of the word (Nase) being the Georgian attestation of the Middle Persian name Narseh, which ultimately derives from Avestan nairyō.saŋya-. The Middle Persian name Narseh also exists in Georgian as Nerse. The name Ādurnarsēh appears in the Armenian language as Atrnerseh.

Adarnase was the son of Bagrat Magistros and succeeded him as duke of Tao in 945. Adarnase and, more prominently, his son David III benefited from the weakness of their cousins, the "royal" Bagratid line of Iberia-Kartli, to assert their influence and prestige in the region. Adarnase was probably married to a daughter of David, member of the Klarjeti line of the Bagratids. They had two sons: David III, and Bagrat II, who forced him to resign and retire to a monastery.
