= Mampali =

Mampali (Georgian: მამფალი) was a dynastic title in medieval Georgia (late 8th-10th centuries), usually held by high-ranking Bagratid princes of Tao-Klarjeti who did not possess any Byzantine dignities. It is compound of the words მამა (mama, "father"), and უფალი (upali, "lord"). The following Bagratid princes held the title of mampali:

- Guaram Mampali (died 882)
- Gurgen I Mampali (c. 870–891)
- Sumbat I Mampali (c. 870–889)
- Bagrat I Mampali (889–900)
- David Mampali (889–943)
