= Sumbat I of Klarjeti =

Sumbat I სუმბატ I

Prince of Klarjeti
- Reign: c. 870 – 899
- Successor: Bagrat I
- Dynasty: Bagrationi
- Father: Adarnase II of Tao-Klarjeti
- Religion: Eastern Orthodox Church

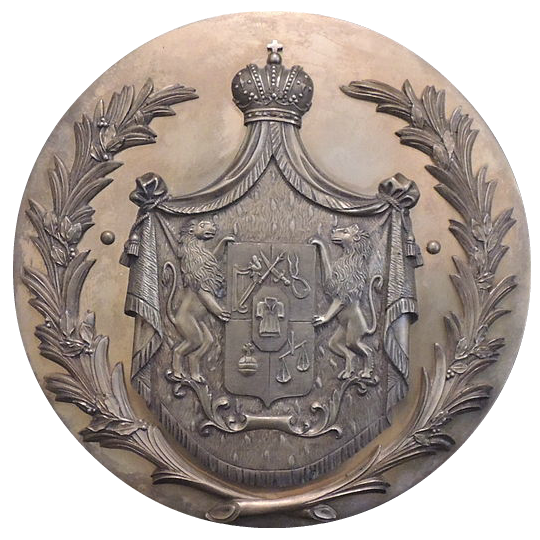
COA of Bagrationi dynasty

Sumbat I (Georgian: სუმბატ I) (died 899) was a Georgian prince of the Bagratid dynasty of Tao-Klarjeti and hereditary ruler of Klarjeti from c. 870 until his death.

A son of Adarnase II of Tao-Klarjeti, Sumbat received the province of Klarjeti as an appanage where he ruled with the title of mampali, which seems to have passed on to Sumbat and his progeny after the extinction of the line of Guaram Mampali. He also bore the Byzantine title of antipatos patrician (antipatrikios, ανθύπατος πατρίκιος). Sumbat had a residence at Artanuji (modern Ardanuç, Turkey), which towards the end of the 9th century began to develop into a thriving trading centre. Hence comes his territorial epithet Artanujeli (არტანუჯელი), i.e., "of Artanuji". Sumbat is referred to as "the Great" by Constantine Porphyrogenitus, author of De Administrando Imperio, where his name is rendered as Symbatius.

Apart from Klarjeti, Sumbat must also have possessed Adjara and Nigali, since the latter two appear among the possessions of his son David (died 943). Sumbat also had a younger son Bagrat (died 900). The Art Museum of Georgia in Tbilisi possesses a late 9th-century reliquary cross whose donation inscription refers to Khosrovanush, wife of Sumbat, and her sons Bagrat and David. Khosrovanush is unattested elsewhere.
