= Ashot Avedyan =

Iranian footballer

Personal information
- Full name: Ashot Avedyan
- Place of birth: Iran
- Position: Forward

Senior career*
Years	Team	Apps	(Gls)
1947–1948	Docharkheh Savaran		
1949	Taj		

International career
1948	Iran	1	(0)
- * Club domestic league appearances and goals

Ashot Avedyan (Armenian: Աշոտ Ավեդյան, Persian: آشوت آودیان) is an Iranian football forward who played for Iran. He also played for Docharkheh Savaran and Taj SC.
