= Mukhurisi =

Central province of Lazica

Mukhurisi or Samokalako (English: The province of towns), is a historical place in West Georgia and was the central province of Lazica. Mukhurisi was located in a strategical location. The main trade routes in Lazica was passing through Mukhurisi.

== Geography ==
It is located in a plain area, between the rivers of Rioni and Tskhenistsqali. The most fertile soils of Colchis Kingdom was located in that area.

== History ==
It is claimed that name of the area was derived from castle called Mukhrisi, which exact location is unknown. First mention about Mukhurisi was in VI. or VII. century.

== Sources ==
- Muskhelishvili, D. (1984). "მუხურისი" (PDF). Georgian Soviet Encyclopedia (in Georgian). Vol. 7. Tbilisi. p. 232.
