= Smbat Artsruni =

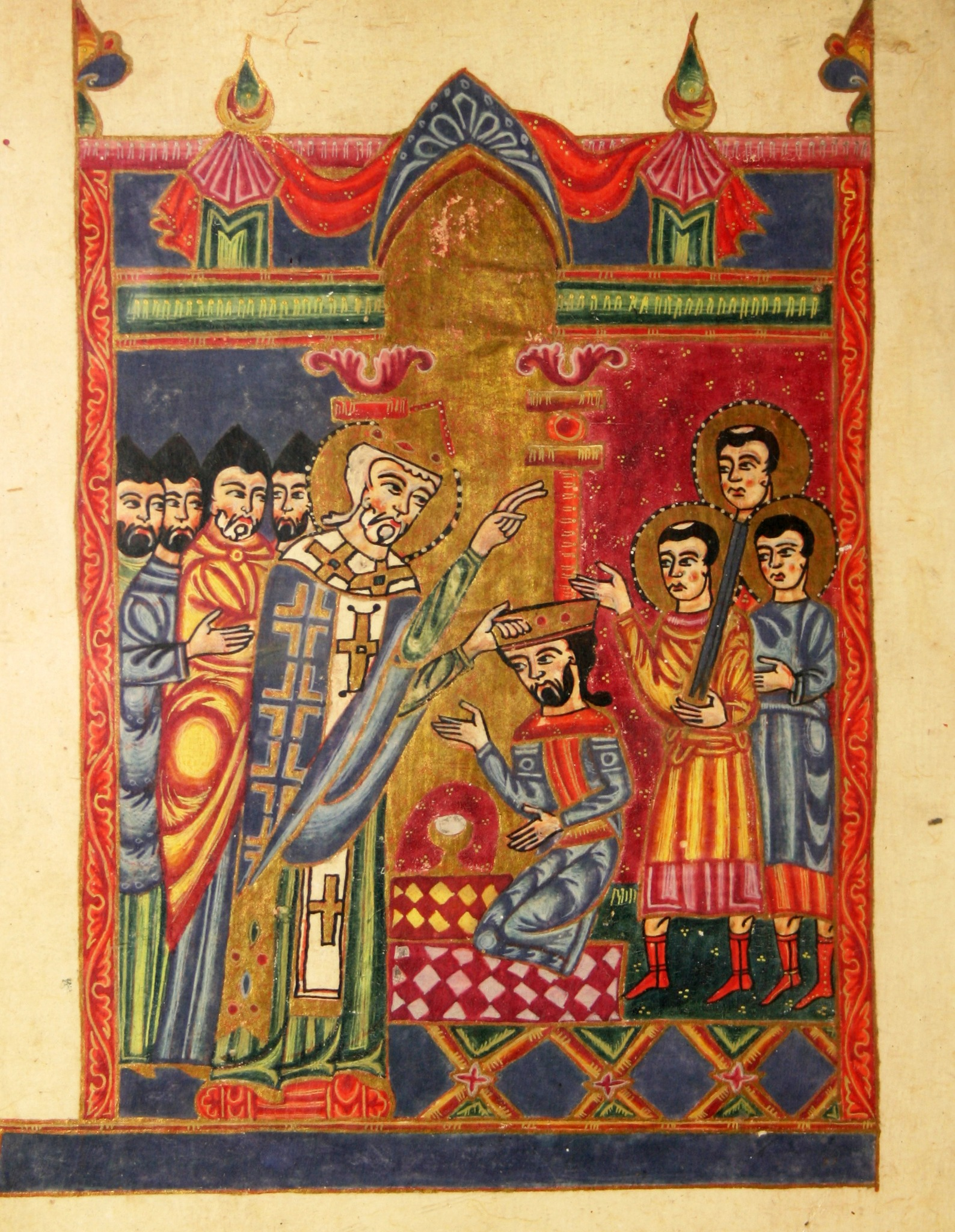
- Stepanos III consecrates Smbat Artsruni, 1471
- Children: Iskender Sefedinyan
- Parents: Gurjibek Sefedinyan (father); Dunia Sefedinyan (mother)
- Family: Sefedinyans-Artsrunis

Smbat Sefedinyan-Artsruni (died circa 1471) was the last King of the Armenians, reigning from 1465 to 1471. A member of the Sefedinyan dynasty, Smbat was the nephew of Catholicos Zakaria III of Aghtamar and claimed descent from the royal Artsruni family of Vaspurakan. Following the fall of the Armenian Kingdom of Cilicia in 1375, the Armenian Church, led by Zakaria III, sought to restore an Armenian kingdom, gaining the support of Jahanshah, the leader of the Karakoyunlu tribe. Smbat was crowned with Jahanshah's approval, though his rule was limited to Aghtamar Island and the shores of Lake Van. While short-lived, his reign reflected the enduring Armenian aspiration for statehood.

== Path to kingship ==
Following the fall of the Armenian Kingdom of Cilicia in 1375, the aspiration for an independent Armenian state persisted. Armenian spiritual and secular leaders, recognizing their limitations, sought diplomatic assistance from European countries to realize this goal.

== Steps towards restoration ==
As Armenian noble families weakened, the Armenian Church assumed the role of advocating for the restoration of the kingdom. Catholicos Zakaria III of Aghtamar, a member of the Artsruni dynasty, petitioned Jahanshah, leader of the Karakoyunlu tribal confederation, which controlled much of Armenia at the time. Jahanshah, who adopted a relatively tolerant policy toward Christian populations, aimed to rebuild the region's economy and stimulate trade and craftsmanship. In this context, Zakaria III proposed his nephew, Smbat Artsruni, as a candidate for the Armenian throne.

== Restoration of the kingdom ==
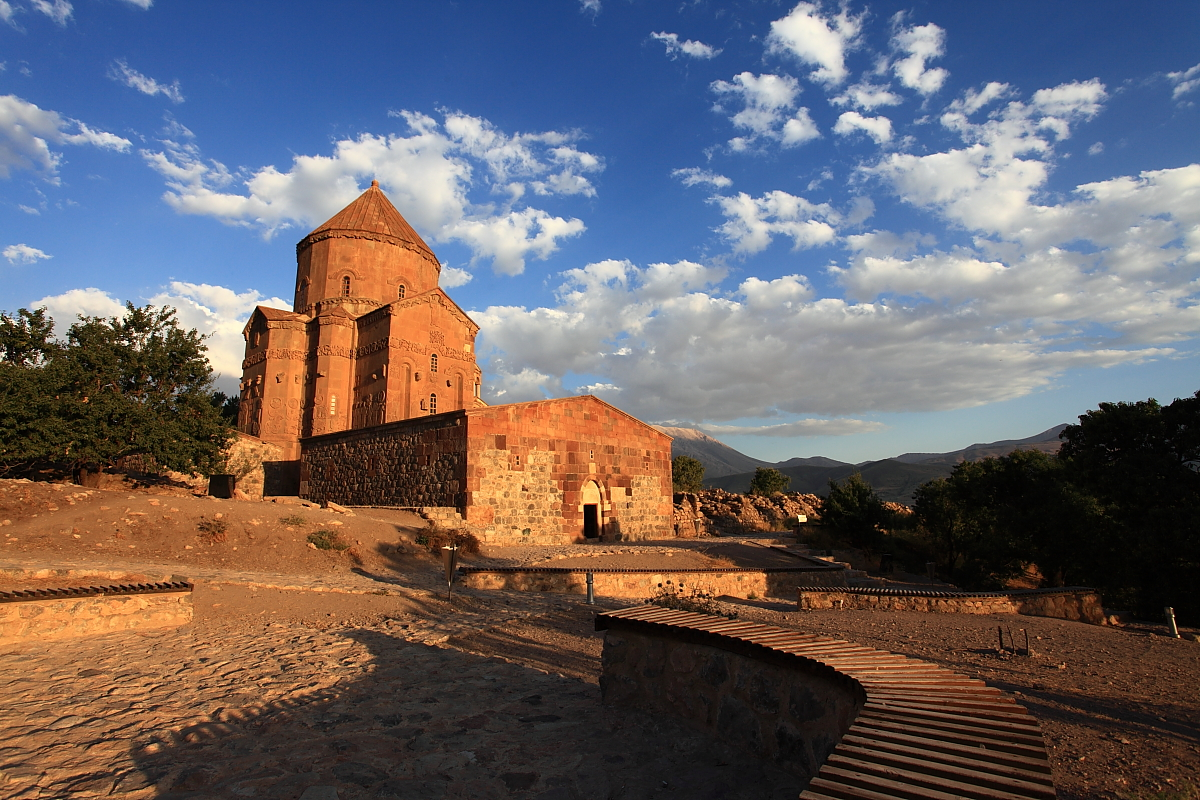
Cathedral of the Holy Cross, Aghtamar.

With Jahanshah's approval, Smbat Artsruni was crowned King of the Armenians in 1465 at a ceremony held in the Holy Cross Church of Aghtamar. The coronation was conducted by Catholicos Stepanos IV Tgha, as Catholicos Zakaria III had died earlier that year. Contemporary sources celebrated the event: “And so Lord Smbat was anointed King of the Armenians, following the example of his ancestor Gagik. May God strengthen his reign and raise his throne, for the Armenian nation had not seen a king for a long time.” However, Smbat's reign was limited in scope, with his authority extending only over Aghtamar Island and parts of the shores of Lake Van. He is recorded as the King of the Armenians until 1471.

== Historical significance ==
Smbat's brief reign is notable within the context of Armenian liberation movements, as it illustrates the enduring vitality of the idea of Armenian statehood. While his kingdom was neither extensive nor long-lasting, it reflected the continuing desire among Armenians for the restoration of an independent state.

== Sources ==
- Acharian, Hrachya. Dictionary of Armenian Personal Names. Yerevan: Academy of Sciences, 1942, p. 562.
