= Sempad Thor'netsi =

Thornetsi was a family that ruled the region of Djahan in Armenia. Its main ruler was Sempat Thor'netsi c. 975.
