= Ashot I of Iberia =

Ashot I აშოტ I
- Kouropalatēs
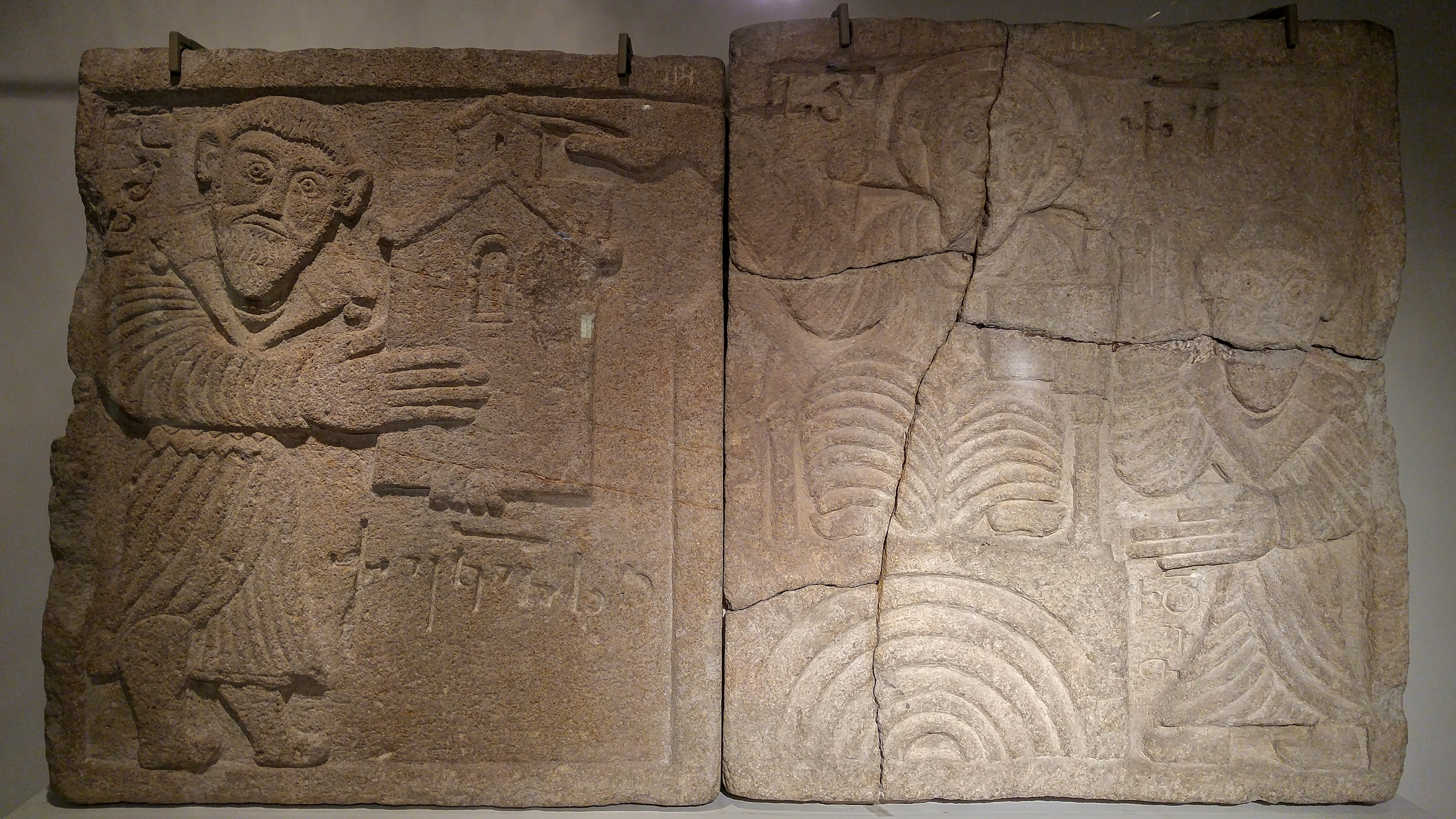
- Relief of Ashot I at Simon Janashia Museum of Georgia

Presiding prince of Iberia
- Reign: 813–826/830
- Predecessor: Stephen III
- Successor: Bagrat I of Iberia; Adarnase II of Tao-Klarjeti; Guaram Mampali
- Died: 29 January 826 (or 29 January 830); Nigali valley
- Spouse: Guaramavri
- Issue Among others: Adarnase II of Tao-Klarjeti; Bagrat I of Iberia; Guaram Mampali
- Dynasty: Bagrationi dynasty
- Father: Adarnase I of Tao-Klarjeti
- Religion: Georgian Orthodox Church

Ashot I the Great (Georgian: აშოტ I დიდი, romanized: ashot' I didi; died 29 January 826) was a presiding prince of Iberia (modern Georgia), first of the Bagratid family to have attained to this office c. 813. From his base in Tao-Klarjeti, he fought to enlarge the Bagratid territories and sought the Byzantine protectorate against the Arab Muslim encroachment until being murdered c. 826. Ashot is also known as Ashot I Kouropalates for the Byzantine title of kouropalates that he bore. A patron of Christian culture and a friend of the church, he has been canonized by the Georgian Orthodox Church.

== Biography ==
Ashot was the son of the Iberian nobleman Adarnase who had founded the Bagratoni hereditary fiefdom in Tao-Klarjeti (now northeast Turkey) and bequeathed to his son extensive possessions acquired upon the extinction of his Guaramid and Chosroid cousins. Ashot initially failed to gain a foothold in central Iberia (Shida Kartli), his efforts being dashed by the Arab control of Tiflis. Ashot established himself in his patrimonial duchy of Klarjeti, where he restored the castle of Artanuji said to have been built by the Iberian king Vakhtang I Gorgasali in the 5th century, and received the Byzantine protection, being recognized as the presiding prince and kouropalates of Iberia. To revive the country devastated by the Arabs and cholera epidemics, he patronized the local monastic communities established by Grigol Khandzteli, and encouraged the settlement of the Georgians in the region. As a result, the political and religious center of Iberia was effectively transferred from central Iberia to the south-west, in Tao-Klarjeti.

From his base in Tao-Klarjeti, Ashot fought to recover more Georgian lands from the Arab hold and, though not always successful, succeeded in taking much of the adjoining lands from Tao in the southwest to Shida Kartli in the northeast, including Kola, Artani, Javakheti, Samtskhe, and Trialeti. Of the former Chosroid possessions, only Kakheti to the east eluded him. With local Arab emirs in the Caucasus growing ever more independent, the Caliph recognized Ashot as the prince of Iberia in order to counter the rebellious emir of Tiflis Isma’il ibn Shu’aib c. 818. The emir had enlisted support of Ashot's foe—the Kakhetian prince Grigol—and the Georgian highland tribes of Mtiulians and Tsanars. Ashot, joined by the Byzantine vassal king of Abkhazia, Theodosius II, met the emir on the Ksani, winning a victory and pushing the Kakhetians from central Iberian lands.

The Bagrationi's fortunes reversed when Khalid ibn Yazid, the Caliph's viceroy of Arminiya, moved in to reinforce the central Arab authority in the Caucasian polities in 827/828 through the Emirate of Tbilisi. Ashot I must have been still alive at that time, and the information provided by the 11th-century Georgian chronicler Sumbat, according to which Ashot was murdered in 826, is doubtful. It is more likely that the event took place four years later, on January 29, 830. Driven by the Arabs from central Iberia, Ashot fell back to the Nigali valley where he was assassinated by renegades at the altar of a local church. Upon Ashot's death, his holdings were allotted to his three sons: Bagrat I, Adarnase II, and Guaram.

== Family ==
Ashot I was married to Guaramavri (died 14 November 836). His children were:

- A daughter, who married Theodosius II of Abkhazia;
- Adarnase II of Tao-Klarjeti (died 867/869);
- Bagrat I of Iberia (died 876);
- Guaram Mampali (died 882).

== Sources ==
- Suny, Ronald Grigor (1994). The Making of the Georgian Nation. Indiana University Press. ISBN 978-0253209153.

Preceded by Stephen III/Interregnum	Prince of Iberia c. 813–826/830	Succeeded by Bagrat I Adarnase II; Guaram
