= Bagrat III of Klarjeti =

Georgian prince of Bagrationi dynasty from Tao-Klarjeti

Prince Bagrat III (died 1028) (Georgian: ბაგრატ) was a Georgian prince of the Bagrationi dynasty from Tao-Klarjeti.

He was son of Prince Sumbat III of Klarjeti.

Prince Bagrat rebelled against King Bagrat III of Georgia and proclaimed himself as King of Klarjeti. He took refuge in Constantinople.

In 1028, the new king Bagrat IV of Georgia imprisoned him and he died during the captivity.
