= Adarnase II of Tao-Klarjeti =

Adarnase II, sometimes known as Adarnase I, (Georgian: ადარნასე) was a Georgian Bagratid prince and a co-ruler of Tao-Klarjeti with his brothers — Bagrat I Kuropalates and Guaram Mampali — with the title of eristavt-eristavi ("duke of dukes") (830-c. 870).

== Biography ==
The name Adarnase derives from Middle Persian Ādurnarsēh, with the second component of the word (Nase) being the Georgian attestation of the Middle Persian name Narseh, which ultimately derives from Avestan nairyō.saŋya-. The Middle Persian name Narseh also exists in Georgian as Nerse. The name Ādurnarsēh appears in the Armenian language as Atrnerseh.

Adarnase was the oldest son of the Georgian presiding prince Ashot I and inherited all the lands west to the Arsiani Range with the exception of Shavsheti and Lower Tao (now in Turkey). After Adarnase's death c. 870, his possessions were equally divided among his sons: Gurgen obtained Tao, while Sumbat received Klarjeti.

== Family ==
Adarnase was married to Anastasia (Bevreli), granddaughter of George I of Abkhazia. Their children were:

- Gurgen I of Tao (died 891), Kouropalates (881–891);
- Ashot (died 867);
- Sumbat I of Klarjeti (died 889);
- An unnamed daughter, who married Sparapet Abbas, brother of Ashot I of Armenia.
