= Gurgen I of Klarjeti =

Prince Gurgen I (Georgian: გურგენ) (died 923) was a Georgian prince of the Bagrationi dynasty of Tao-Klarjeti branch.

He was a son of Prince Bagrat I of Klarjeti.

He became Bagrat's immediate successor, but he must have been a rather insignificant ruler since he had no official title. He had a posthumous son also called Gurgen who died in 968.
