= David II of Klarjeti =

Sumbat II სუმბატ II

Prince of Klarjeti
- Reign: 988 – 993
- Predecessor: Sumbat II
- Successor: Sumbat III
- Dynasty: Bagrationi
- Religion: Eastern Orthodox Church

David II (Georgian: დავით II) (died 993) was a Georgian prince of the Bagratid dynasty of Tao-Klarjeti and ruler of Klarjeti from 988 until his death.

David II was a son of Sumbat II, whom he succeeded as prince of Klarjeti. Virtually nothing is known about his life. He died without issue, being succeeded by his nephew Sumbat III.
