= David I of Klarjeti =

David I დავით I

Prince of Klarjeti
- Reign: 889 – 943
- Predecessor: Bagrat I
- Successor: Sumbat II
- Issue: Sumbat II of Klarjeti
- Dynasty: Bagrationi
- Religion: Eastern Orthodox Church

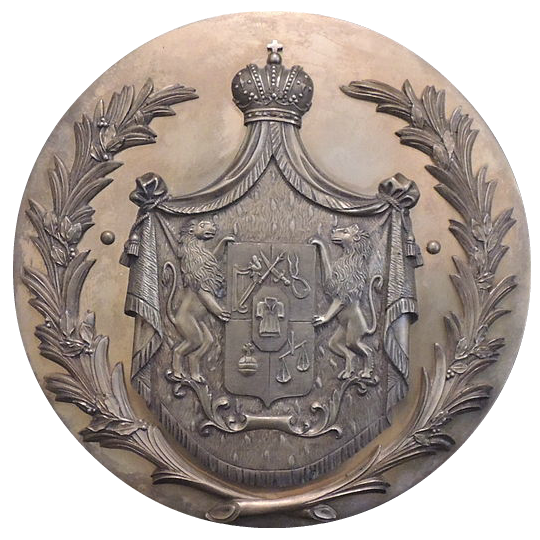
Coat of arms of the Bagritioni dynasty

David I (Georgian: დავით I) (died February 23, 943) was a Georgian prince of the Bagratid dynasty of Tao-Klarjeti who ruled, with the title of mampali, in Adjara and Nigali from 889 and in Klarjeti from 900 until his abdication in 943.

David was the oldest son of Sumbat I, founder of the Klarjeti line of the Bagratids. Upon Sumbat’s death in 889, David’s younger brother Bagrat I became a successor in Klarjeti, while David’s holdings were confined to the less important territories of Adjara and Nigali. With Bagrat’s death in 900, David retrieved Klarjeti with its key fortress and trading town of Artanuji. He abdicated in favor of his son Sumbat II and died as a monk in 943.

David is mentioned by Constantine Porphyrogenitus in his De Administrando Imperio which renders David's title in Greek as mampalis (μάμπαλις) and incorrectly translates it as "all-holy".
