= Adarnase II of Klarjeti =

Georgian prince (died 945)

Prince Adarnase II (Georgian: ადარნასე) (died 945) was a Georgian prince of the Bagrationi dynasty of Tao-Klarjeti branch.

He was the oldest son of Prince Bagrat I of Klarjeti.

Adarnase became a monk and changed his name to Basil. Adarnase received the title of curopalates from Emperor Leo VI the Wise.
