= Bagrat II of Klarjeti =

Prince Bagrat (Georgian: ბაგრატი) (died in 988) was a Georgian prince of the Bagrationi dynasty of Tao-Klarjeti.

Prince Bagrat was son of Sumbat II of Klarjeti and father of Sumbat III of Klarjeti and George. George was the father of Demetrius of Klarjeti.

He died forty days after his father, in 988.
