= Bagrat I of Klarjeti =

Bagrat I ბაგრატ I

Prince of Klarjeti
- Reign: 889 – 900
- Predecessor: Sumbat I
- Successor: David I
- Dynasty: Bagrationi
- Father: Sumbat I of Klarjeti
- Religion: Eastern Orthodox Church

Bagrat I (Georgian: ბაგრატ I) (died 20 April 900) was a Georgian prince of the Bagratid dynasty of Tao-Klarjeti and the ruler of Klarjeti from 889 until his death. There is some confusion in dating Bagrat's death. According to the 11th-century chronicler Sumbat Davitis-Dze, Bagrat died on 20 April, Easter Sunday of the year 129 of the Georgian era (i.e., 909 AD). However, Easter Sunday in 909 fell on 16 April; the year that would coincidence with the given date would be 900.

Bagrat was a younger son of Sumbat I, founder of the Klarjeti line of the Bagratids. Upon Sumbat’s death in 889, he succeeded his father as prince of Klarjeti, while his elder brother (and likely a legitimate successor to Sumbat), David, appear as a ruler of some less important territory north of Klarjeti – Adjara and Nigali. Like Sumbat, Bagrat had the epithet of Artanujeli ("of Artanuji") and ruled with the title of mampali, having a thriving commercial town of Artanuji as his residence. In 891, he became involved in the dynastic feud among the Bagratids and helped Adarnase IV to defeat Gurgen I. On Bagrat's death Artanuji seems to have been retrieved by his brother David, while the rest of his territory was further divided between his four sons, who soon started quarrelling amongst themselves.

Bagrat had four sons:

- Prince Adarnase II
- Prince Gurgen I
- Prince Ashot
- Prince David, died in 922

According to Constantine Porphyrogenitus's De Administrando Imperio Bagrat also had a daughter who was married to her relative Sumbat II of Klarjeti.
