= Ashot the Beautiful =

Ashot the Beautiful (Georgian: აშოტ კეკელა, romanized: ashot' k'ek'ela) was a Georgian Bagratid prince of Tao-Klarjeti. Son of Adarnase II of Tao-Klarjeti. Died in 867.
