= Nasra of Tao-Klarjeti =

Georgian prince (Bagratid dynasty)

Nasra or Nasri (Georgian: ნასრა, romanized: nasra) (died 888) was a Georgian prince of the Bagratid dynasty of Tao-Klarjeti involved and eventually killed in a dynastic war with his relatives.

The oldest and only surviving son of Guaram Mampali, Nasra murdered his cousin David I, curopalates of Iberia, in 881. The reason for committing this crime probably was that Guaram Mampali prior to his death had given away his all territories which had practically left Nasra without an inheritance. After the murder, Nasra fled to the Byzantine territory from where he was retrieved by his brother-in-law Bagrat I of Abasgia. Bagrat also managed to secure the Byzantine military aid and invaded the Bagratid possessions on Nasra's behalf. Anxious to counterbalance the Byzantine influence in the Caucasus, Ashot I of Armenia interfered in support of David I’s son Adnarnase. Thus, a Bagratid dynastic feud evolved into a regional conflict. Nasra succeeded in taking the forts of Odzrkhe, Juaristsikhe and Lomsianta, but was finally defeated, captured and put to death at Aspindza.
