= Bagrat II of Tao =

Bagrat II ბაგრატ II
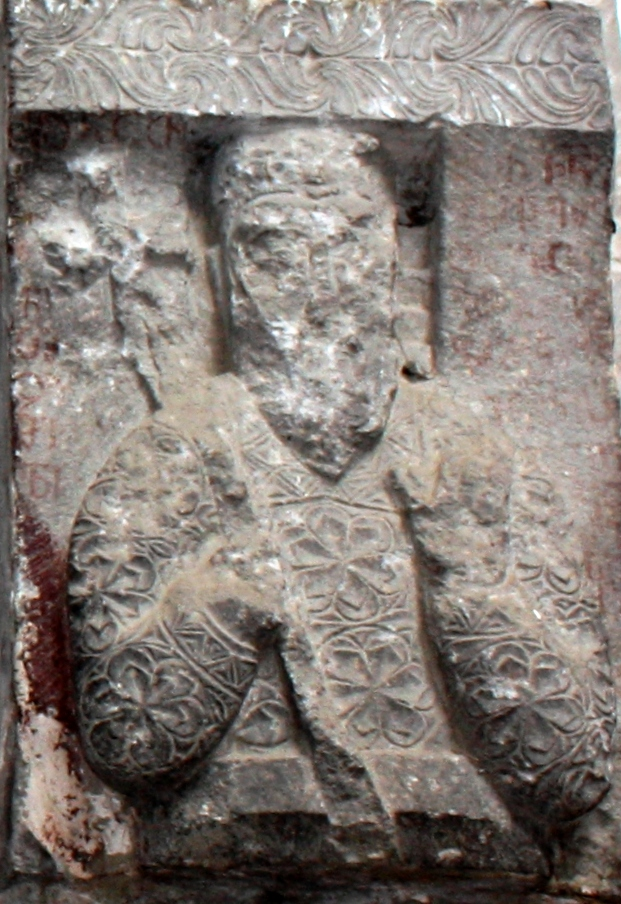
- Bagrat as depicted on a bas-relief from the Oshki cathedral

Duke of Upper Tao
- Reign: 961 – 966
- Predecessor: Adarnase V
- Successor: David III
- Died: 966
- Dynasty: Bagrationi
- Father: Adarnase V of Tao
- Mother: David I of Klarjeti's daughter
- Religion: Georgian Orthodox Church

Bagrat II (Georgian: ბაგრატ II) (died 966) was a Georgian prince of the Bagratid dynasty of Tao-Klarjeti who ruled the Duchy of Upper Tao from 961 until his death in 966. A figure whose position within the Bagration dynasty remains unclear, he came to the throne after a coup d'état against his father, but did not manage to remain duke for long.

== Biography ==
Bagrat was the eldest son of Adarnase V of Tao, a Kouropalates and influential political leader of the Georgian states during the Abkhazian occupation of Kartli, and a daughter of David I of Klarjeti. Information about his life is lacking in detail, but it is known that he took part with his younger brother David in a plot against his own father, forcing the latter to abdicate and join the monastic orders against his will in 961. This coup allowed Bagrat to become Duke of Upper Tao, but there is no record of the Byzantine dignity of Kouropalates being passed on after the event.

Bagrat's short reign is poorly documented and the duke, who had the title of eristavt-eristavi, or ‘duke of dukes’, probably achieved nothing of note during this period, despite the fact that he found himself the strong man of the Bagrationi dynasty due to the Abkhazian occupation of Kartli. Giorgi Merchule's 10th-century hagiographic work Life of Gregory of Khandzta mentions Bagrat II as a protector of Georgian culture and a builder of churches. He is considered to be the founder of the cathedral at Oshki.

Bagrat probably died in 966. Having no descendants, he left his estates to his younger brother David, who later became David III Kuropalates.

== Bibliography ==
- Toumanoff, Cyril (1990). Les dynasties de la Caucasie chrétienne de l'Antiquité jusqu'au xixe siècle : Tables généalogiques et chronologiques [Dynasties of Christian Caucasus, from Ancient Times to the 19th century: Genealogical and Chronological Tables] (in French). Rome.
- Brosset, Marie-Félicité (1849). Histoire de la Géorgie, depuis l'Antiquité jusqu'au XIXe siècle - 1re partie. St. Petersburg: Saint Petersburg Academy of Sciences.
