= Bagrat I of Iberia =

Presiding prince of Iberia
- Reign: 826–876
- Predecessor: Ashot I of Iberia
- Successor: David I of Iberia
- Died: 876
- Spouse: Daughter of Smbat VII Bagratuni
- Issue: David I of Iberia; Adarnase; Ashot
- Dynasty: Bagrationi
- Father: Ashot I of Iberia
- Religion: Georgian Orthodox Church

Bagrat I (Georgian: ბაგრატ I; died 876), of the Bagratid dynasty, was a presiding prince of Iberia (modern Georgia) from 826 until his death.

== Biography ==
Bagrat inherited from his father Ashot I the office of presiding prince of Iberia and the Byzantine title of curopalates. The 10th-century Georgian writer Giorgi Merchule maintains that Bagrat was confirmed as curopalates, following his father, with the agreement of his brothers — Adarnase, and Guaram. Bagrat shared with his brothers the patrimonial holdings, but which lands he actually possessed is not directly indicated in the medieval sources. He probably ruled over a part of Tao and Kola (now in Turkey).

Bagrat I found himself in a constant struggle with the Arabs, the Abasgians and the Kakhetians over the possession of central Iberia (Shida Kartli) and especially the Emirate of Tbilisi. In 842, he joined the Arab expedition led by Muhammad ibn Khalid al-Shaybani, the Caliph's viceroy in the Caucasus, against the rebel emir of Tbilisi, Sahak ibn Ismail, and his Kakhetian allies. In turn, the Caliph recognized Bagrat the prince of Iberia-Kartli. The expedition ended fruitlessly and Bagrat had to make peace with Sahak. In August 853, Bagrat joined the Caliph's second expedition against Sahak, this time led by Bugha the Turk who took Tbilisi and had the emir executed. As a result, Bagrat was able to regain Shida Kartli, but only for a brief time as the resurgent Abasgians forced him out of this region.

Like his father Ashot, Bagrat was a patron of the large-scale monastic movement in Klarjeti. He granted the monk Grigol Khandzteli material help to build the monastery church at Khandzta and helped build the monasteries of Shatberdi and Ishkhani.

== Family ==
Bagrat I was married to a daughter of the Armenian prince Smbat VIII Bagratuni and sister of King Ashot I of Armenia. They had three sons:

- David I of Iberia (died 881), Prince of Iberia (r. 876–881);
- Adarnase (died 874);
- Ashot (died 885).

Preceded by Ashot I	Prince of Iberia & Curopalates; 826–876	Succeeded by David I
