= David I of Iberia =

Presiding prince of Iberia & Curopalates
- Reign: 876–881
- Predecessor: Bagrat I of Iberia
- Successor: Gurgen I of Tao
- Died: 881
- Issue: Adarnase IV of Iberia
- Dynasty: Bagrationi dynasty
- Father: Bagrat I of Iberia
- Religion: Georgian Orthodox Church

David I (Georgian: დავით I) (died 881) was a Georgian Bagratid Prince and curopalates of Iberia/Kartli from 876 to 881. He was murdered by Nasra of Tao-Klarjeti, who self-proclaimed as his successor. David's death led to an inter-dynastic feud under David's only son Adarnase, who eventually, in 888, avenged the killing of his father.

== Biography ==
=== Reign ===
David Bagrationi was born before 861, son of Prince Bagrat I of Iberia and of his wife, a daughter of Armenian prince Smbat VIII Bagratuni. Spending his youth in his father's domains in Tao-Klarjeti, he was baptized by the famous Georgian saint Grigol of Khandzta, at the time in charge of the spiritual mobilization of Georgians against the Abbasid Caliphate.

At the death of his father in 876, he inherited the Duchy of Lower Tao and was recognized as legitimate ruler of Iberia by the Byzantine Empire, which granted him the title of Kouropalates.

David I's foreign policy remains poorly known. He was recognized by Byzantium as legitimate leader of Iberia, though he paid tribute to the Abbasid Caliphate. Moreover, he sought a pro-Armenian policy by backing Ashot I Bagratuni against the influence of the Kingdom of Abkhazia in Western Georgia. Despite that, he sought an alliance by marrying the daughter of an Abkhazian King.

His reign only lasted for five years, but he remains known for his building of the Monastery of Khakhuli in Tao-Klarjeti.

=== Murder ===
In 881, northern Georgian nobleman Guram Mamphali ceded his domains in Trialeti to the powerful Liparit Baghvashi, a prince under David I's suzerainty. Fearing losing his inheritance, Guram's son Nasra, himself a cousin of David I, murdered the latter. This forced Guram Mamphali to resign, while Nasra sought and failed to be recognized as Kouropalates. An Armenian-Abbasid coalition, reinforced by troops loyal to the Bagrationi dynasty, intervened and expelled Nasra to the Byzantine Empire.

David's young son Adarnase inherited his father's territories as Duke of Lower Tao. However, his young age led Byzantium to appoint David's cousin Gurgen as Kouropalates in Iberia, which would lead to a civil war that ended in 888 with the crowning of Adarnase as the "king of the Iberians".

== Family ==
David I's wife is unknown. According to ancient Georgian sources, she may have been a daughter of King "Constantine of Abkhazia", who chronologically can only refer to Constantine III, though the latter started his reign in 894 and married a daughter of Adarnase IV of Iberia, David I's son, making it impossible. The "King" Constantine mentioned may also be a mistake for an otherwise unknown Abkhazian prince who never really reigned, possibly a son of George I. Meanwhile, the De Administrando Imperio of Constantine VII talks of the wife of "David, father of Adarnase Kouropalates" as being a daughter of "Smbat, son of David". This lineage cannot be confirmed by Georgian sources and it may be an anachronism confusing with his own daughter, who married another Adarnase (David I himself being the grandson of Smbat VIII Bagratuni).

David I had at least two children:

- Adarnase IV of Iberia (d. 923), king of the Iberians.
- a daughter, wife of duke Adarnase III of Tao.

== Bibliography ==
- Brosset, Marie-Félicité (1849). Histoire de la Géorgie depuis l'Antiquité jusqu'au XIXe siècle. Volume I [History of Georgia from Ancient Times to the 19th Century, Volume 1] (in French). Saint-Petersburg: Imperial Academy of Sciences.
