= Guaram Mampali =

9th-century Georgian Bagratid royal

Guaram, the mampali, (Georgian: გუარამ მამფალი; died 882) was a Georgian Bagratid prince and the youngest son of Ashot I, the founder of the Bagratid dynasty of Iberia/Kartli.

== Biography ==
Guaram shared the control over the patrimonial holdings of Tao-Klarjeti with his two brothers — Bagrat I the Curopalate and Adarnase — his portion being the territory east of the Arsiani Range except for Kola (now in Turkey). According to the Georgian Chronicles, Guaram was married to a sister of the Armenian ruler Ashot V. Guaram pursued an aggressive policy of expansion. He seized the Bagratids' traditional foe, the Arab emir of Tbilisi, named Gabulots, and sent him in chains to Byzantium. Following the extinction of the ruling house (vitaxae) of Gogarene, which had been in possession of several areas on the Georgian-Armenian frontier, Guaram acquired Javakheti, Trialeti, Ashots, and Artani. The 10th-century hagiographer Giorgi Merchule praises Guaram's dignities and refers to him as "the great".

Prior to 876, Guaram handed over some of his possessions to his brothers, and gave Ashots to his Armenian brother-in-law, Ashot V. Liparit, of the Liparitids (Baguashi), took over Trialeti, where he built the stronghold Klde-Karni and placed himself under suzerainty of Guaram's nephew David I the Curopalate soon after 876. These rearrangements left Guaram's son Nasra essentially with no inheritance and probably induced him in 881 to murder his cousin David I in a plot of which Guaram is reported by a medieval chronicler to have been ignorant. Guaram spent his last years in retirement at the Opiza convent where he was buried after his death in 882.

== Family ==
Guaram was married to a sister of Ashot I of Armenia. His children were:

- Nasra (died 885);
- Ashot (died 869);
- An unnamed daughter, who was married first to Adarnase of Abkhazia and second to Bagrat I of Abkhazia.
