= Sumbat III of Klarjeti =

Sumbat III სუმბატ III

Prince of Klarjeti
- Reign: 993 – 1011
- Predecessor: David II
- Successor: Bagrat III
- Dynasty: Bagrationi
- Father: Bagrat II of Klarjeti
- Religion: Eastern Orthodox Church

Sumbat III (Georgian: სუმბატი) (died 1011) was a Georgian prince of the Bagrationi dynasty of Tao-Klarjeti and the last sovereign of Klarjeti from 993 until being dispossessed by King Bagrat III of Georgia in 1011.

A son of Bagrat II of Klarjeti (died 988), son of Sumbat II of Klarjeti, Sumbat succeeded upon the death of his childless paternal uncle David II as the sovereign of Klarjeti, a position which he shared with his brother Gurgen. The 10th-century Georgian chronicler of the Bagratids, Sumbat Davitis-Dze, affords them a royal title – klarjni khelmtsipeni (კლარჯნი ჴელმწიფენი, lit. Sovereigns of Klarjeti). Sumbat and Gurgen ruled over a portion of the hereditary Bagratid territory which remained outside the control of their distant cousin Bagrat III who had become a king of a unified Georgia in 1008. In 1011, the brothers were invited by Bagrat to negotiations at the castle of Panaskerti, but were arrested and held captive in the castle of Tmogvi, where they were soon put to death. Their possessions passed to Bagrat and his progeny. Their children – Bagrat, son of Sumbat, and Demetre, son of Gurgen – fled to Constantinople from where they would try to retrieve patrimonial lands with the Byzantine aid, for the last time in 1032, but to no avail.
