= Nigali valley =

- Turkish: Nigali Vadisi; Georgian: ნიგალი, ნიგალის ხევი
- Location within Turkey Location within Adjara Location within Caucasus Mountains

Geography
- Country: Turkey
- Coordinates: 41°36′11″N 41°34′27″E
- Interactive map of Nigali valley

Nigali or the Nigali valley (Georgian: ნიგალი, ნიგალის ხევი, nigalis khevi), also known, through a subsequent metathesis, as Ligani (ლიგანი) or Livana (ლივანა; Turkish: Livâne) is a historical district on the lower course of the Çoruh or Chorokhi river, currently divided between Turkey and Georgia.

== History ==
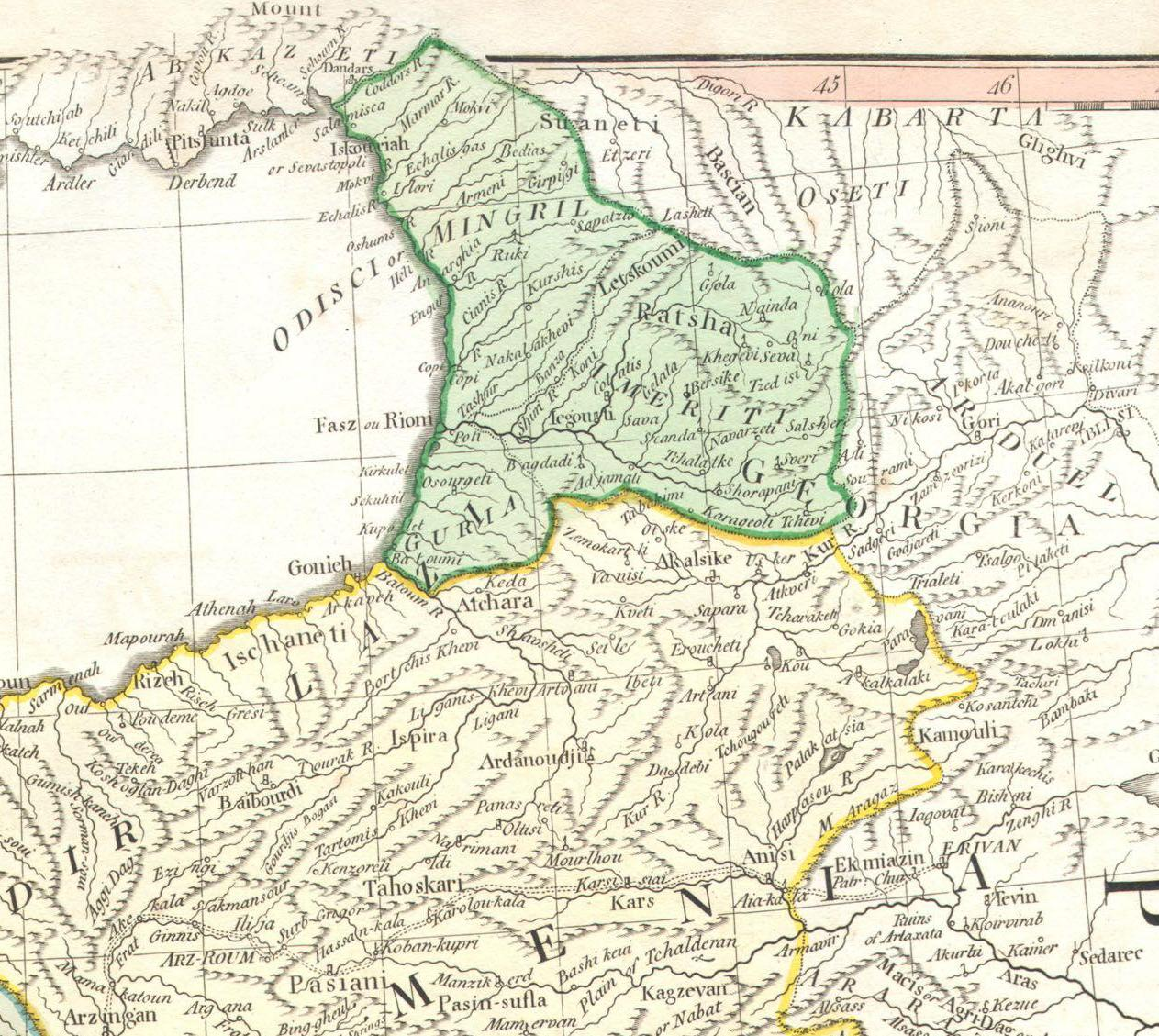
A portion of d'Anville's 1794 map identifying the then-Ottoman-controlled Livâne in Georgian name Liganis Khevi, "the Ligani valley".

The land known as Nigal first appears as one of the districts of Colchis in the 7th-century Armenian geography attributed to Ananias of Shirak. In the 8th century, Nigali became part of an appanage of the Georgian Bagratid family. It was bounded by Adjara on the north-east, Shavsheti on the east, and Klarjeti on the south. The medieval Georgian sources also make mention of Niali, which is likely a corruption of Nigali. The early 18th-century Georgian scholar Prince Vakhushti refers to it as Ligani and locates the district on either bank of the Chorokhi as far as Art'vani (now Artvin). In c. 1530, the area was conquered from Georgians by the Ottoman Empire, which administered it as the kaza or sanjak of Livâne. It had the sub-district of Maçahel administratively dependent on it.

In 1878, Nigali was part of the territory ceded by the Ottomans to the Russian Empire in the Treaty of Berlin. It was included in the Artvin circuit (uchastok) of the Batum Oblast. Following World War I (1914–1918) and the short-lived independence of Georgia (1918–1921), Nigali was divided between Turkey and recently Sovietized Georgia in accordance with the 1921 treaties of Moscow and Kars.

== Current division ==
Currently, the Turkish portion of Nigali comprises parts of the Borçka, Murgul, and Artvin districts of the Artvin Province. The Georgian-speaking element is still present in this area, but knowledge of the Georgian language is weakening among the younger generation. The Georgian portion consists of only 9 villages administered as part of the Khelvachauri Municipality of the Autonomous Republic of Adjara.

== See also ==
- Imerkhevi
