= Sumbat II of Klarjeti =

Sumbat II სუმბატ II

Prince of Klarjeti
- Reign: 943 – 988
- Predecessor: David I
- Successor: David II
- Dynasty: Bagrationi
- Religion: Eastern Orthodox Church

Sumbat II (Georgian: სუმბატ II) (died 988) was a Georgian prince of the Bagratid dynasty of Tao-Klarjeti and ruler of Klarjeti from 943 until his death.

Sumbat was the only son of David I, whom he succeeded as prince of Klarjeti. Little is known of his life. The 10th-century Georgian hagiographer Giorgi Merchule and an insertion in the Gospels manuscript from the Parkhali monastery refer to him as eristavt-eristavi ("the duke of dukes") and eristavi ("the duke"), respectively. According to Constantine Porphyrogenitus's De Administrando Imperio Sumbat was married to his cousin, daughter of Bagrat I of Klarjeti.

He had two sons:

- David II
- Bagrat II
