= Bagrat I of Tao =

Bagrat I ბაგრატ I

Duke of Upper Tao
- Reign: 941 – 945
- Predecessor: Gurgen II
- Successor: Adarnase V
- Dynasty: Bagrationi
- Father: Adarnase IV of Iberia
- Religion: Eastern Orthodox Church

Bagrat I (Georgian: ბაგრატ I) (died March 945) was a Georgian prince of the Bagratid dynasty of Tao-Klarjeti and hereditary ruler of Upper Tao with the Byzantine title of magistros. He also held lands in Javakheti, Shavsheti, Kola, Artaani and Phasiane.

Bagrat was a son of the Georgian king Adarnase IV and acquired the duchy of Upper Tao after the death, in 941, of his relative Gurgen II with whom the first house of Tao became extinct. Bagrat was, thus, the founder of the second house of Tao whose ascendancy would last until 1000/1001. According to the 18th-century historian Vakhushti, Bagrat also held the Byzantine title of curopalates, but this is not attested by earlier sources. Bagrat was survived by a son, Adarnase. A church inscription from Ishkhani (now in Turkey) calls Bagrat "magistros and king".
