= Klarjeti =

Historical province of Georgia

Coordinates: 41°11′00″N 41°49′05″E

Historical Klarjeti in the 8th-10th centuries

Klarjeti (Georgian: კლარჯეთი [kʼlaɾd͡ʒetʰi]) was a province of ancient and medieval Georgia, which is now part of Turkey's Artvin Province. Klarjeti, the neighboring province of Tao and several other smaller districts, constituted a larger region with shared history and culture conventionally known as Tao-Klarjeti.

== Early history ==
Klarjeti, traversed by the Chorokhi (Çoruh), stretched from the Arsiani Range westwards, towards the Black Sea, and was centred in the key fortified trading town of Artanuji (now Ardanuç). It was bordered by Shavsheti and Nigali on the north, and Tao on the south. The region roughly corresponds to Cholarzene (Ancient Greek: Χολαρζηνή, Καταρζηνή) of Classical sources and probably to Kaţarza or Quturza of the earlier Urartian records.

Klarjeti was one of the south-westernmost provinces of the Kingdom of Iberia, which appeared on the Caucasian political map in the 3rd century BC and was ruled—according to the medieval Georgian chronicles—by the Pharnavazid dynasty. From the 2nd century BC to the 3rd century AD, Klarjeti as well as some other neighboring lands were contested between the kingdoms of Iberia and Armenia (Armenians knew Klarjeti as Kļarjk'), and passed to and fro from one state to the other. In the 370s division of Iberia between the Roman and Sasanian empires, Klarjeti passed to the former, but it is unknown whether as a province or as a vassal. The marriage of the Chosroid king Vakhtang I of Iberia to the Roman princess Helena seems to have enabled the Iberians to regain the province c. 485. Thereafter, Klarjeti remained in the possession of Vakhtang's younger sons and their romanophile descendants who formed the house of Guaramids and maintained themselves in Klarjeti and Javakheti until c. 786, when the Guaramid possessions passed to their resurgent cousins from the Bagrationi family.

== Duchy of Klarjeti ==
Duchy of Klarjeti კლარჯეთის საერისთავო
- 870–1008
- Status: Duchy
- Capital: Artanuji
- Common languages: Georgian
- Religion: Eastern Orthodox (Georgian Orthodox Church)
- Historical era: Early Middle Ages
  - Sumbat I received the province of Klarjeti.: 870
  - Disestablished: 1008
Preceded by	Succeeded by
Bagratid Iberia	Kingdom of Georgia
- Today part of: Countries today: Georgia; Turkey

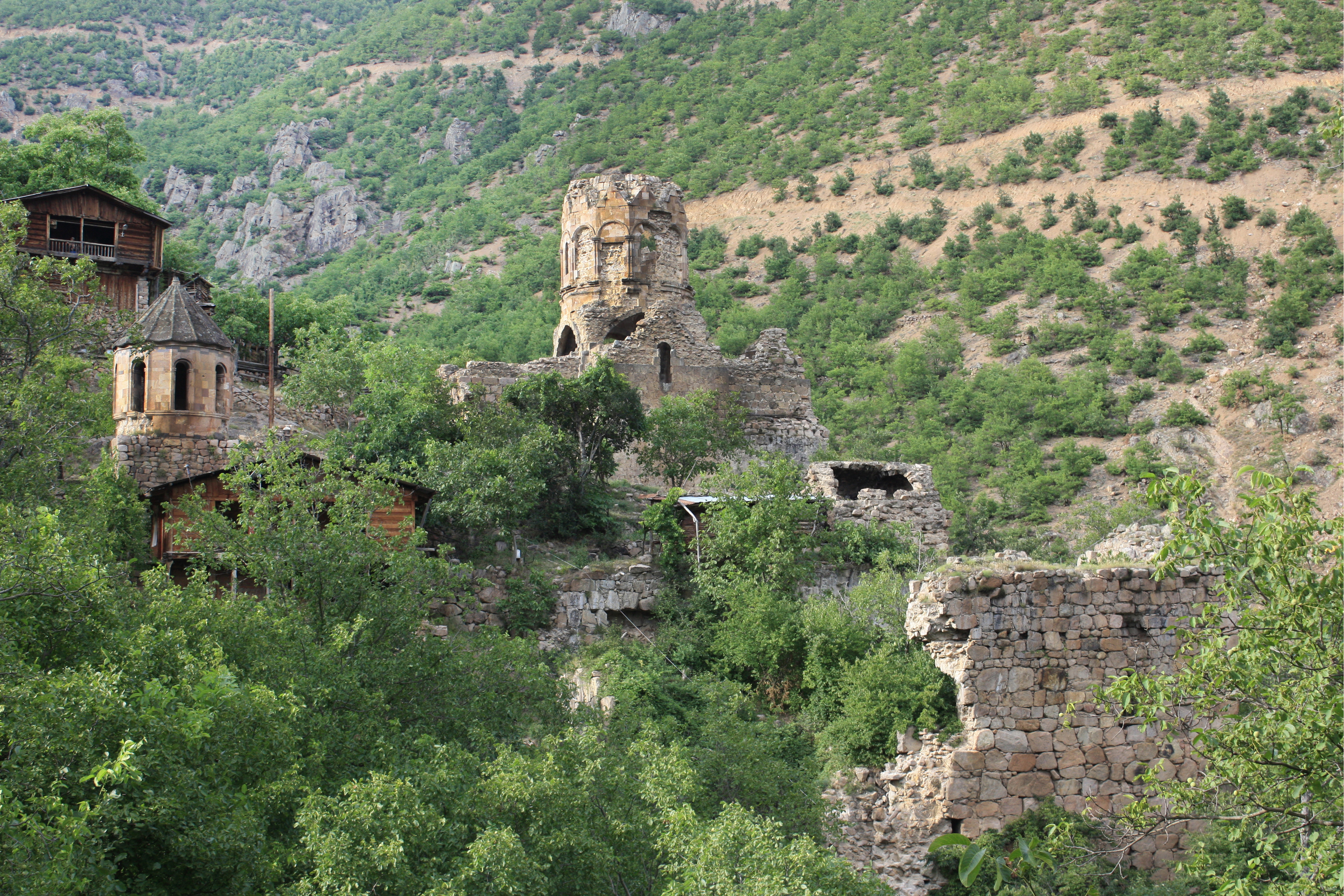
The monastery of Khandzta, now in ruins

The Bagrationi dynasty presided over a period of economic prosperity and cultural revival in the area. The taxes collected at Artanuji were a major factor in the rise of the Bagrationi power. Deserted in an Arab invasion, Klarjeti was repopulated and developed into a major centre of Christian culture aided by a large-scale monastic movement initiated by the Georgian monk Gregory of Khandzta (759 – 861).

Around 870, Klarjeti became a hereditary fiefdom of one of the three principal branches of the Georgian Bagrationi rulers. This line—known in the medieval Georgian records as the Sovereigns of Klarjeti (კლარჯნი ხელმწიფენი, klarjni khelmts'ip'eni)—was eventually dispossessed by their cousin Bagrat III, the first king of a unified Georgia, in 1010. Bagrat III granted area to the Abuserisdze family.

Klarjeti never fully recovered from a series of Seljuk attacks later in the 11th century and further declined in the Mongol and Timur's invasions in the 13th and 14th century. After the partition of the Kingdom of Georgia in the 15th century, Klarjeti passed to the princes of Meskheti who lost the area to the Ottoman conquest in 1551.

=== Rulers of Klarjeti ===
Klarjeti

City Cathedral One of "the twelve monasteries of Klarjeti"	Church or monastery Castle or fortress

Prince	Reign	Notes
Sumbat I Mampali, the Great	870–889	
Bagrat I	889–900	
David I	900–943	
Sumbat II	943–988	
David II	988–992/993	
Sumbat III	992/993–1011	co ruler: Gurgen
John Abuser	1011–1030	
Abuser I Abuserisdze	1046/1047	
Grigol Abuserisdze	1047–1070	
Abuser II Abuserisdze	–	
