= Ardanuç =

- Municipality
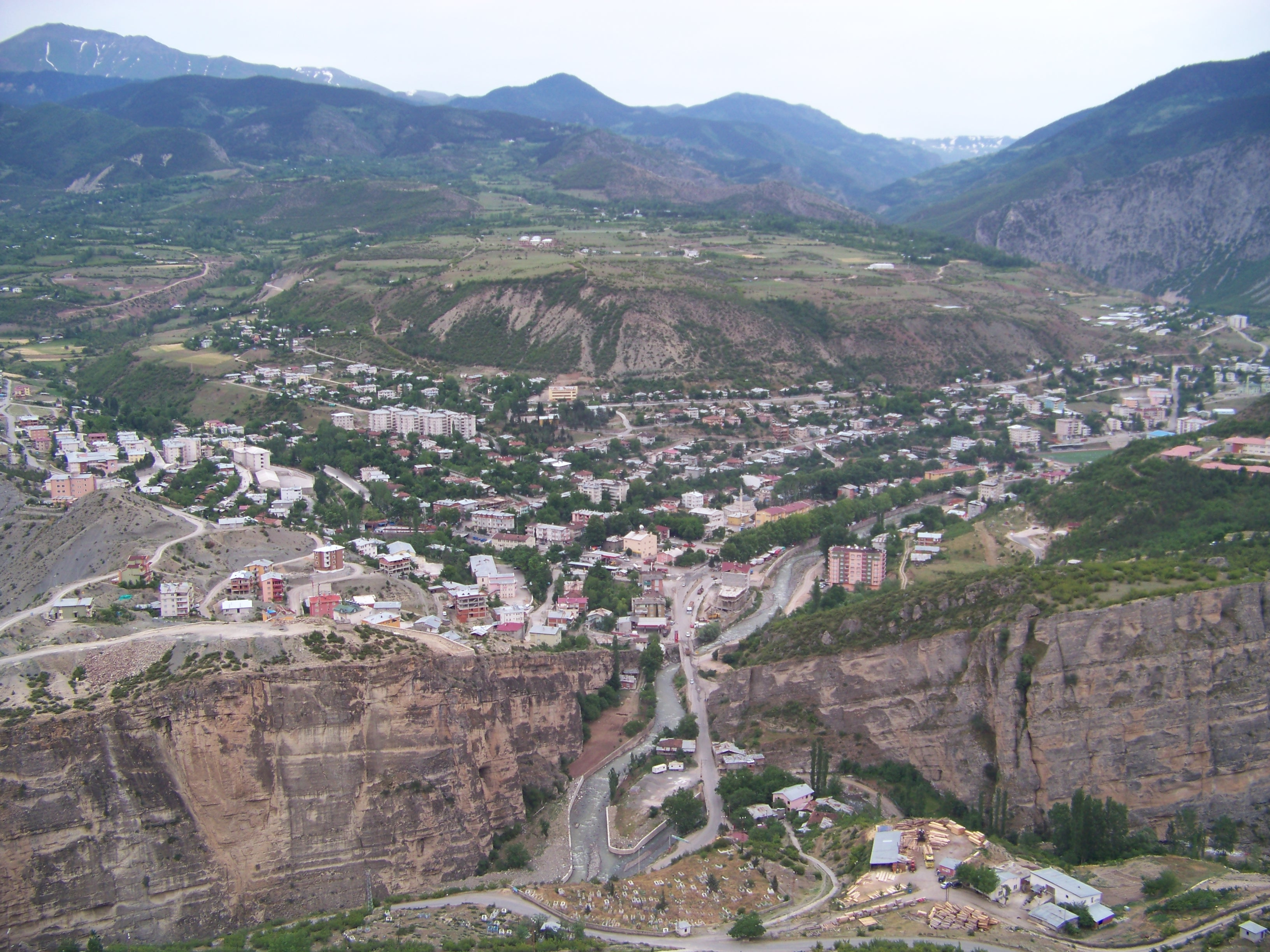

- Location within Turkey
- Coordinates: 41°07′43″N 42°03′33″E
- Country: Turkey
- Province: Artvin
- District: Ardanuç

Government
  - Mayor: Emrah Yılmaz (AKP)
- Elevation: 558 m (1,831 ft)
- Population (2021): 5,470
- Time zone: UTC+3 (TRT)
- Postal code: 08300
- Climate: Cfb

Ardanuç (Georgian: არტან უჯი, romanized: art'an uji; Armenian: Արտանուջ, Artanuj) is a town in Artvin Province in Turkey's Black Sea region of Turkey, 32 km east of Artvin. The name Ardanuç derives from Lazuri language and Armenian (Laz: Artanish-Uji; lit. "edge of Ardahan” in Lazuri and “Ard” meaning field in Armenian"). It is the seat of Ardanuç District. Its population is 5,470 (2021).

== History ==
The history of this area goes back to the settlement of the banks of the Çoruh River by the Hurri and Mitanni branches of the Hittites in 2000 BC. The first mention of Ardanuç was in a Urartu monument to the defeat of the local people in battle by King Sarduri II in 753 BC. Then in the 7th century BC the Saka or Scythians are known to have settled and they dominated Artanuj.The castle of Artanuj was built by Georgian king Vakhtang Gorgasali (5th century AD). The castle was besieged by Arab caliph Marwan II (688–750) Umayyad in 744 AD. and was restored by Ashot I Bagrationi in the 8th century. He also founded a city, which became the center of the "Kingdom of Georgians" of Tao-Klarjeti.

Fighting between the Bagrationi and Anatolian beyliks began in 1080. Artanuj being a mountain stronghold was hard to capture, although it did fall to the Mongols during their wars with the Turks and Georgians in the 13th century and was brought into the Ottoman Empire in 1551 by Suleiman the Magnificent following yet another siege, this time to overturn the local ruler, Atabeg of Samtskhe Jakeli.

Following the Russo-Turkish War (1877–1878) Artanuj/Ardanuç was ceded to Russia. During the early stages of the First World War, Ottoman irregular forces carried out massacres of the local Armenian and other members of the Christian population.

After the Russian Revolution Artanuj became part of Democratic Republic of Georgia. The young state placed itself under German protection and ceded its largely Muslim-inhabited regions (including the cities of Batum, Ardahan, Artvin, Akhaltsikhe and Akhalkalaki) to the Ottoman government (Treaty of Batum, June 4). Following the end of the war, in 1920 Georgia regained control over Artvin, Ardahan, Akhaltsikhe and Akhalkalaki. However, after the Red Army's invasion of Georgia, the region was occupied by the newly formed Republic of Turkey.

== Iskender Pasha Mosque ==
The Iskender Pasha Mosque and Tombs (İskender Paşa Camii ve Türbeleri) was commissioned by Iskender Pasha and opened in 1553. It is built in a classical Ottoman style and has four domes. It also contains the tombs of Hatice Hanım, Ali Pasha and Süleyman Pasha.

== Geography ==
Ardanuç is a mountainous district, rising from 250 m (820 ft) in the Şavşat River basin (Şavşat district) up to the highest point, 3,050 m (10,010 ft) Mount Çadır. Other high mountains are Kürdevan, Yalnızçam and Mount Horasan. The town of Ardanuç is on the western side of Yalnızçam Mount and at the conjunction of Bulanık, Aydın and Horhot streams.

The Cehennem Deresi Canyon, located 7 km (4.3 mi) north of Ardanuç, is a tourist attraction.

== Climate ==
Ardanuç has an oceanic climate (Köppen: Cfb).

Climate data for Ardanuç
Month	Jan	Feb	Mar	Apr	May	Jun	Jul	Aug	Sep	Oct	Nov	Dec	Year
Daily mean °C (°F)	−0.2 (31.6)	1.5 (34.7)	5.5 (41.9)	10.9 (51.6)	14.9 (58.8)	18.1 (64.6)	20.9 (69.6)	21.0 (69.8)	17.7 (63.9)	12.9 (55.2)	7.4 (45.3)	2.4 (36.3)	11.1 (52.0)
Average precipitation mm (inches)	80 (3.1)	70 (2.8)	56 (2.2)	63 (2.5)	63 (2.5)	67 (2.6)	49 (1.9)	54 (2.1)	67 (2.6)	88 (3.5)	91 (3.6)	101 (4.0)	849 (33.4)
Source: Climate-Data.org
