= Gurgen I of Tao =

Gurgen I

Prince of Iberia
- Reign: 881 – 891
- Predecessor: David I
- Successor: Adarnase IV

Duke of Upper Tao
- Reign: 867–891
- Predecessor: Adarnase II
- Successor: Adarnase III
- Died: 891
- Issue: Adarnase III of Tao; Ashot the Immature
- Dynasty: Bagrationi
- Father: Adarnase II of Tao-Klarjeti
- Mother: Bevreli
- Religion: Georgian Orthodox Church

Gurgen I (Georgian: გურგენ I) (died 891) was a Georgian prince of the Bagrationi dynasty, he ascended to the throne of Iberia during a dynastic crisis and assumed the title of Kouropalates. Thanks to a series of diplomatic blunders, Gurgen managed to forge fleeting alliances with Byzantine Empire and Armenia, before becoming embroiled in a civil conflict between princes that ended in his death, thus putting an end to the Principality of Iberia.

== Biography ==
=== Early years ===
The oldest son of Prince Adarnase I and his wife Bevreli, daughter of Bagrat I of Abkhazia. Gurgen was baptized by the prominent monk Gregory of Khandzta. He inherited from his father the duchy of Upper Tao, including the residence of Kalmakhi.

=== The struggle for power ===
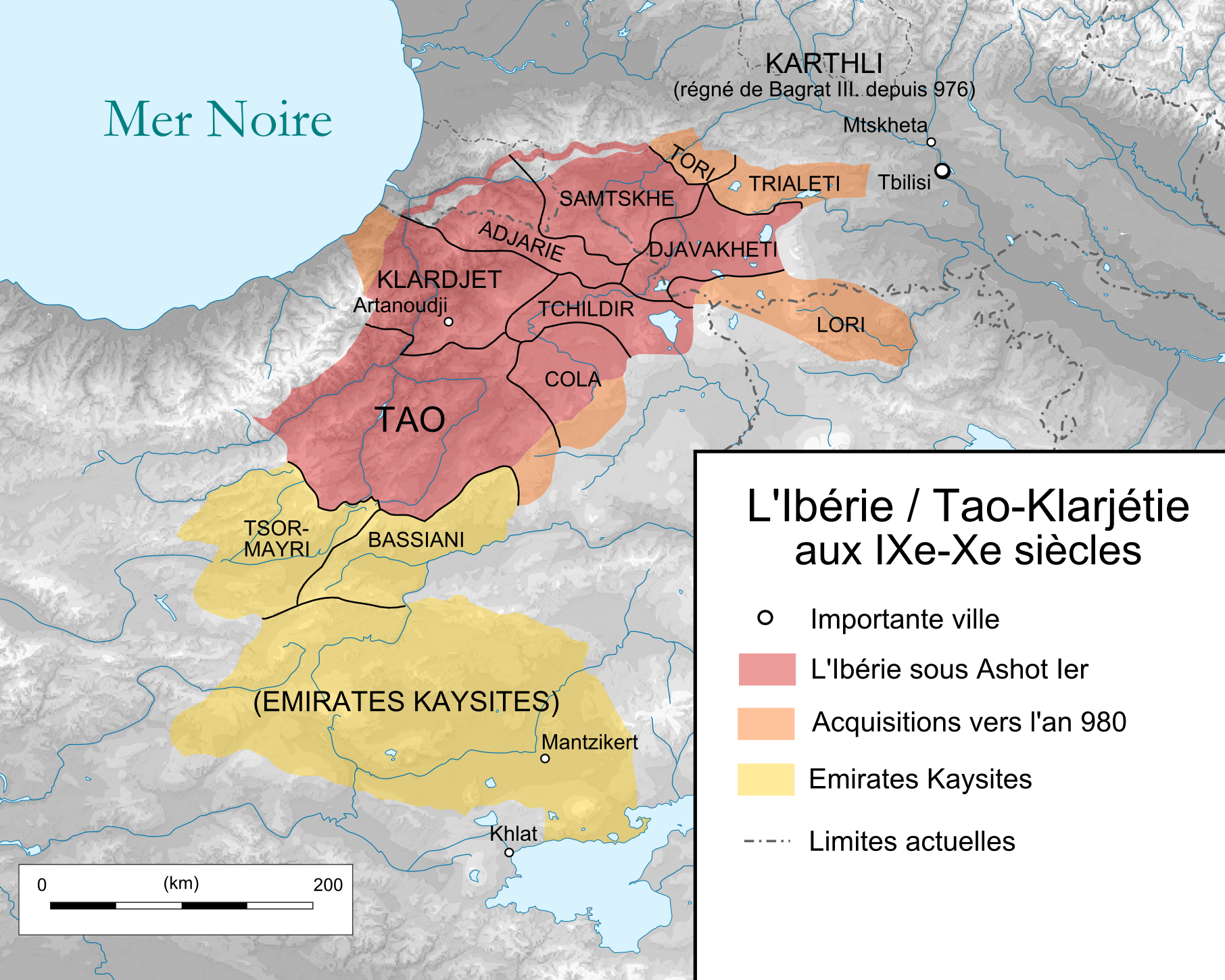
Principality of Iberia in the 9th-10th centuries.

In 881, an event abruptly changed the history of Iberia. With the help of Gurgen, Prince Nasra of Tao-Klarjeti murdered Kouropalates David I of Iberia in a bid to seize power. However, the Georgian loyalist party, led by Liparit Baghvashi and supported by the Ashot I of Armenia, revolted against Nasra to place David's son Adarnase on the throne. As a result of these complications, Nasra was forced to take refuge in Constantinople, while Gurgen, who had remained in Georgia, was given the title of Kouropalates and confirmed on the throne by Byzantine Empire due to Adarnase's minority.

Gurgen, now prince of Iberia and Kouropalates, pursued a policy of national reunification. To this end, he allied himself with the Georgian loyalist party and Armenia, which worsened his relations with the Byzantine Empire and the neighbouring Kingdom of Abkhazia. In 885, Nasra, without support in Iberia but helped by the Byzantines, left Constantinople and headed for Abkhazia, where he was welcomed by his brother-in-law, King Bagrat I of Abkhazia. Bagrat provided the rebel with numerous auxiliaries and Nasra left to regain the throne in Samtskhe. The young Adarnase, who now claimed the throne and was allied with Gurgen, left to defend himself. The three men met in 888 and the loyalist troops, although outnumbered by the Abkhazians, managed to defeat the enemy and capture Nasra, who was executed at Aspindza.

=== New civil war and death ===
As a result of the division of Nasra’s inheritance, Gurgen might have added Shavsheti and Artaani to his possessions, for we hear from the 18th-century Georgian chronicler Vakhushti of Gurgen having moved his residence there. In the meantime Adarnase, not being a curopalate and having the example of his Armenian cousins before him, assumed the title of king. Over the years, relations between Adarnsse and Gurgen increased. The Georgian nobility was once again divided between loyalists and pro-Gurgen, while the influential prince Bagrat I of Klarjeti, who was Gurgen's own nephew, strengthened the loyalist troops. In 891, a battle broke out between the two parties and Gurgen was defeated at Mglinavi. He was captured and died of his wounds some time later. According to his will, Gurgen was buried at the monastery of Opiza restored by him.

== Family ==
Gurgen was probably married to a daughter of Smbat VIII Bagratuni (826–855), the sparapet of Armenia. He left two sons behind:

- Adarnase III of Tao (died 896), ruler of Tao (891–896)
- Ashot the Immature

Thus being a founder of the Bagratid "first house of Tao" which would become extinct with his grandson Gurgen II.

== Bibliography ==
- Asatiani, Nodar; Janelidze, Otar (2009). History of Georgia. Tbilisi: Publishing House Petite. ISBN 978-9941-9063-6-7.
- Brosset, Marie-Félicité (1851). Voyage archéologique en Transcaucasie. Saint-Pétersbourg: Imprimerie de l'Académie impériale des Sciences.
- Toumanoff, Cyril (1990). Les dynasties de la Caucasie chrétienne de l'Antiquité jusqu'au XIXe siècle (in French). Rome: Tables généalogiques et chronologiques.
  Preceded by David I	Prince of Iberia & Curopalates; 881–891	Succeeded by Adarnase IV
