= Ashot the Immature =

Ashot I აშოტ I
- Ashot I of Tao, the Kukhi

Duke of Upper Tao
- Reign: 908 – 918
- Predecessor: David I
- Successor: Gurgen II
- Dynasty: Bagrationi
- Religion: Eastern Orthodox Church

Ashot I also known as Ashot Kukhi (Georgian: აშოტ I კუხი, romanized: ashot' I k'ukhi) (died 918) was a Georgian prince of the Bagratid dynasty of Tao-Klarjeti and hereditary ruler of Tao with the title of eristavt-eristavi, "duke of dukes". He was nicknamed kukhi, meaning "the Immature".

Ashot was the younger son of Gurgen I of Tao. After the death of his elder brother Adarnase in 896, he probably stepped in and co-reigned with his nephew David who was still underage at that time. When David died in 908, Ashot became a sole ruler which he remained until his own death in 918.

The Georgian chronicles Kartlis Tskhovreba and contemporary hagiography such as the Vita of Grigol Khandzteli by Giorgi Merchule evidence that Ashot was a keen supporter of monasticism and cultural projects in Tao-Klarjeti. He sponsored the construction of a cathedral at Tbeti in Shavsheti (now Cevizli, Turkey) and installed as its first bishop Stepane Mtbevari from whom Ashot commissioned the hagiographic novel Martyrdom of Mikel-Gobron. A statue purportedly showing Ashot Kukhi which was removed from Tbeti towards the end of World War I is now on display at the Art Museum of Georgia in Tbilisi.
