= Kingdom of Iberia (disambiguation) =

The Kingdom of Iberia was a Georgian monarchy from 302 BC to AD 580.

Kingdom of Iberia may also refer to:

- Kingdom of the Iberians, AD 888 to 1008
- Kingdom of Georgia, 1008 to 1490
- Kingdom of Kartli, 1460s to 1762

== See also ==
- Iberian Peninsula
