= Gurgen II =

Gurgen II may refer to:

- Gurgen II of Tao (died in 941)
- Gurgen of Georgia, also known as Gurgen II Magistros (ruled 994–1008)
