= Adarnase III of Tao =

Adarnase III ადარნასე III

Duke of Upper Tao
- Reign: 891 – 896
- Predecessor: Gurgen I
- Successor: Ashot
- Dynasty: Bagrationi
- Father: Gurgen I of Tao
- Religion: Eastern Orthodox Church

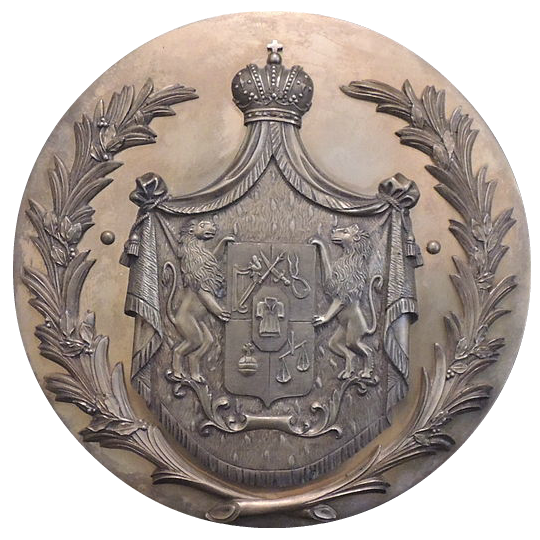
Coat of arms of the Bagrationi dynasty

Adarnase III (Georgian: ადარნასე III) (died 896) was a Georgian prince of the Bagratid dynasty of Tao-Klarjeti and hereditary ruler of Tao with the title of eristavt-eristavi, "duke of dukes".

The name Adarnase derives from Middle Persian Ādurnarsēh, with the second component of the word (Nase) being the Georgian attestation of the Middle Persian name Narseh, which ultimately derives from Avestan nairyō.saŋya-. The Middle Persian name Narseh also exists in Georgian as Nerse. The name Ādurnarsēh appears in the Armenian language as Atrnerseh.

Adarnase was the oldest son of Gurgen I of Tao upon whose death in a dynastic strife he succeeded in 891. Adarnase's tenure was short-lived. He died six years after his accession, leaving two sons and a daughter behind:

- David, the oldest son of Adarnase, also had the title of eristavt-eristavi. He must have been very young when his father died, and it is doubtful, if he ever ruled himself. He died in 908 and did not leave any son behind.
- Gurgen II, "the Great", duke of Tao
- Dinar, proselytizing queen of Hereti
