= Otkhta =

Georgian monastery in Yusufeli, Turkey

Otkhta ოთხთა
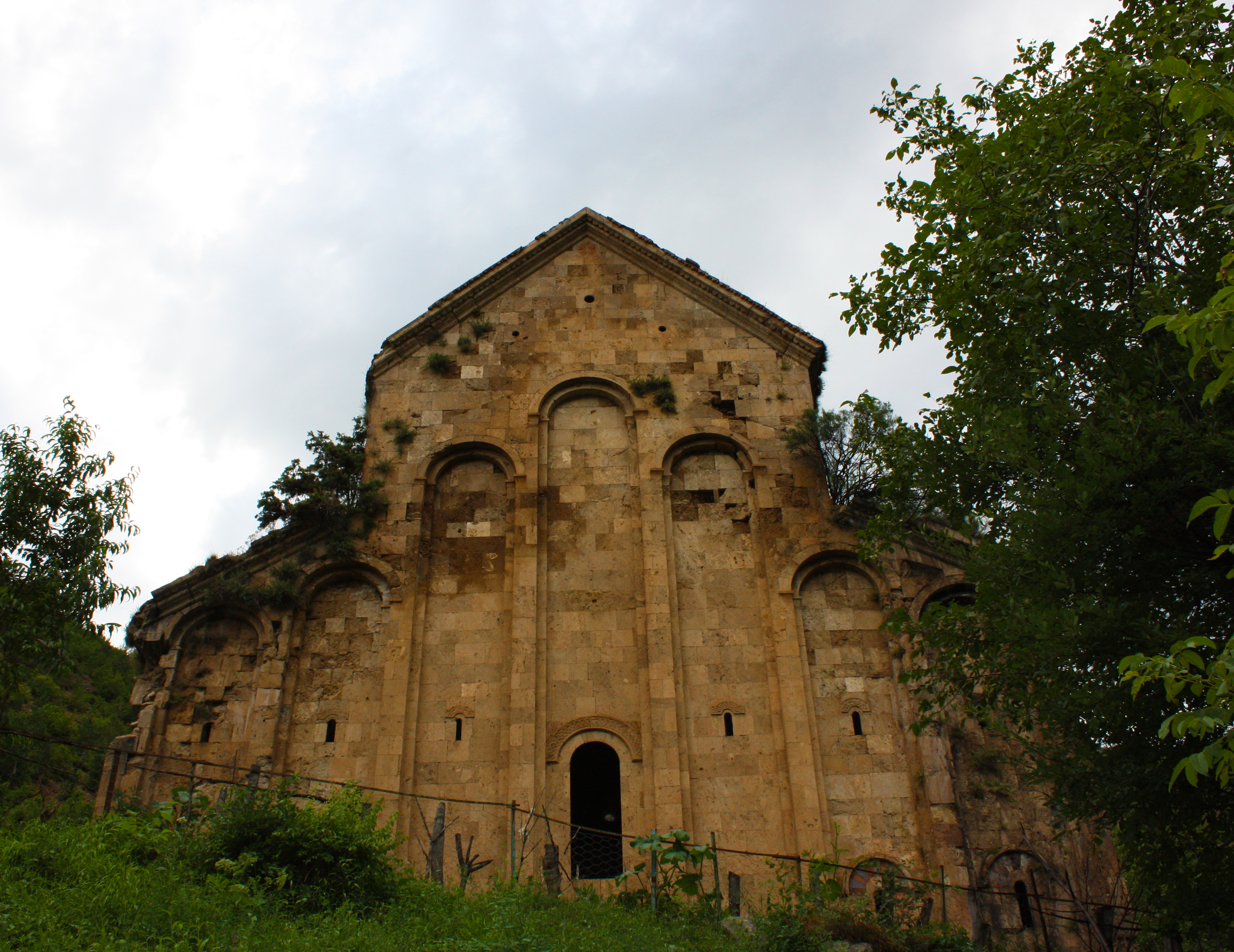

- Location within Turkey

Religion
- Affiliation: Georgian Orthodox Church
- Status: Not functioning

Location
- Location: Artvin province, Turkey
- State: Yusufeli
- Coordinates: 40.8141°N 41.4711°E

Architecture
- Completed: 10th century

Otkhta (Georgian: ოთხთა, Turkish: Dörtkilise) is a 10th-century Georgian monastery which was built in 961–965 by Davit Kurapalat and renewed in 978–1001. Georgian monastery and cathedral church located in Dörtkilise, the town of Yusufeli, Artvin Province, Turkey.

Otkhta is one of the large cathedrals in Tao-Klarjeti, with Oshki, Ishkhani and khakhuli, and one version that is why it is called Otkhta, which means in English "from fourth".

== Architecture ==
Otkhta monastery consists of additional constructions of Seminary, dining-hall and some little chapels; they are almost destroyed even in hard condition is self main Cathedral Otkhta. The cathedral is later period Georgian basilica and dedicated forth Gospeller. Church architectural structure is different from another Georgian basilica like are Sion of Bolnisi and Ruisi.

== Gallery ==
Scheme of the main church

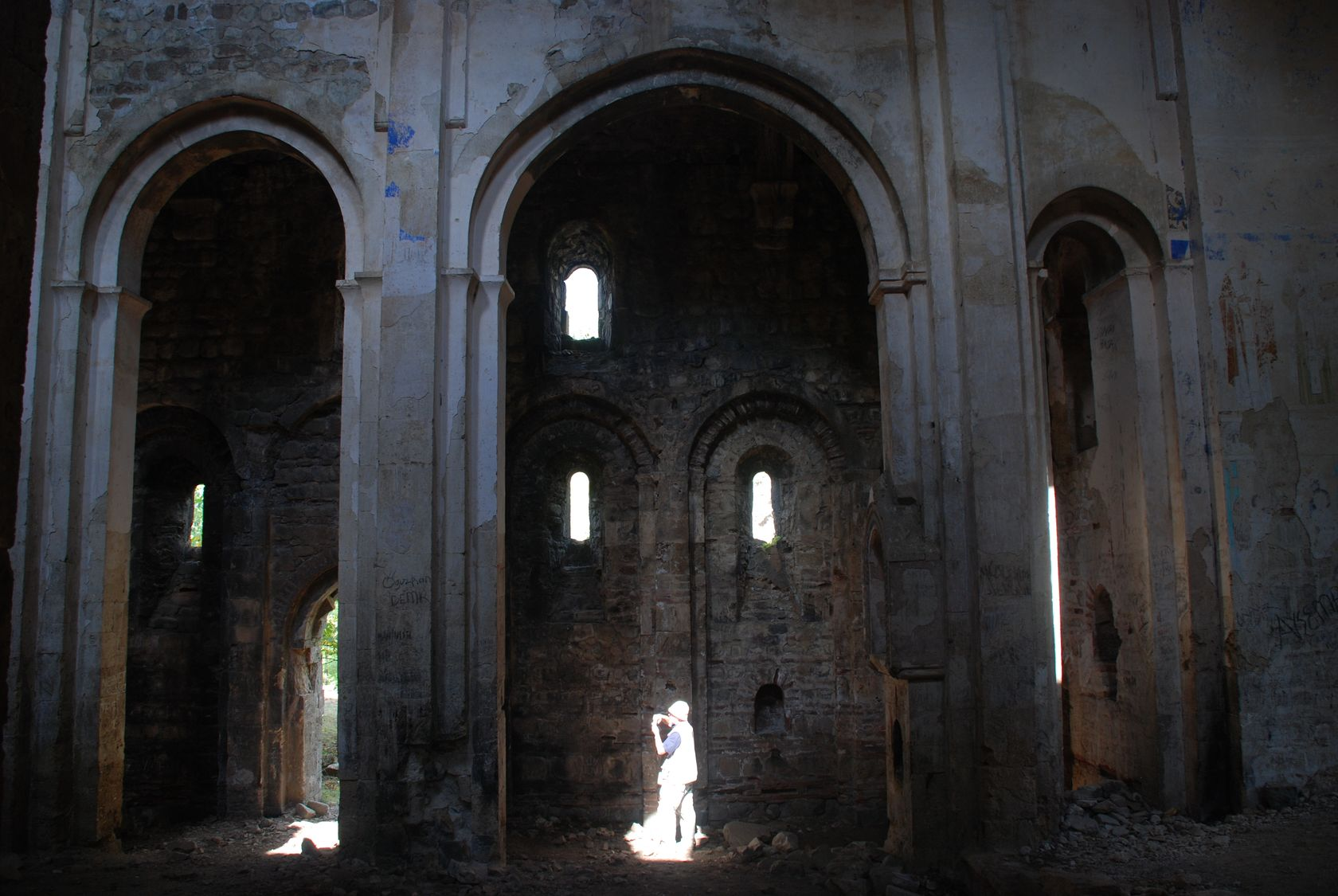
Inside interior

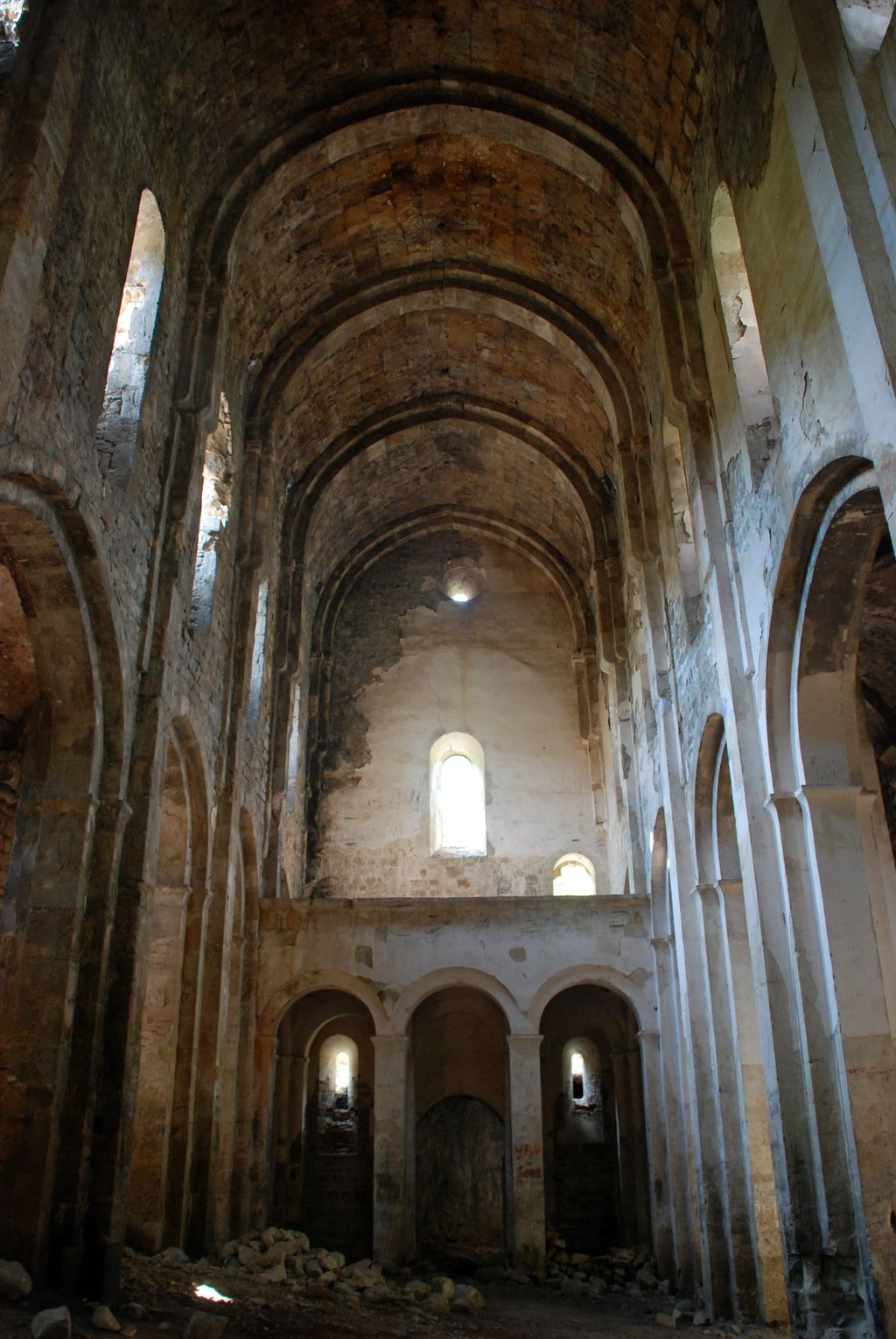
Inside interior

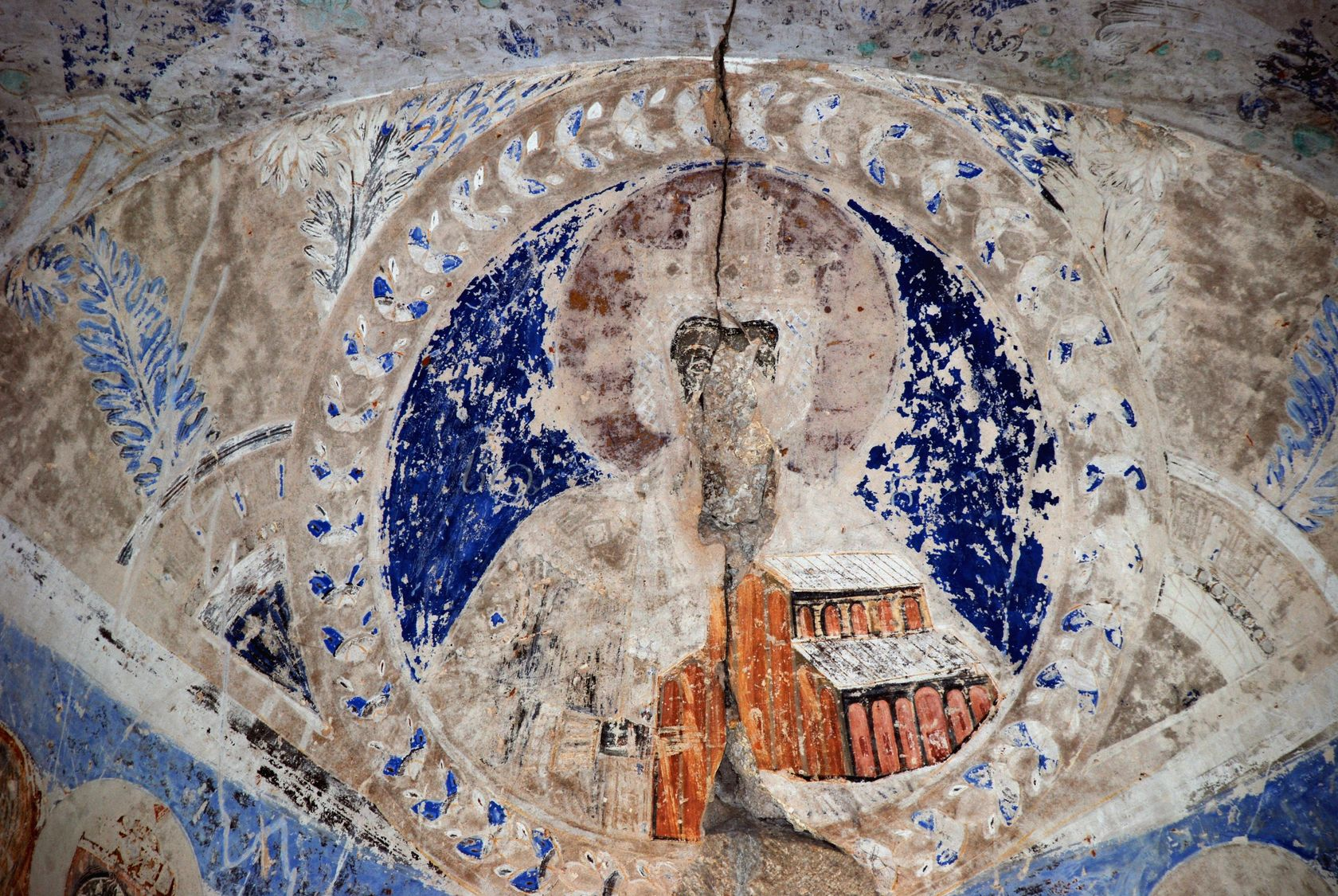
Fresco in Alter
