= Khakhuli Monastery =

Coordinates: 40°51′44″N 41°45′37″E

Khakhuli Monastery ხახულის მონასტერი
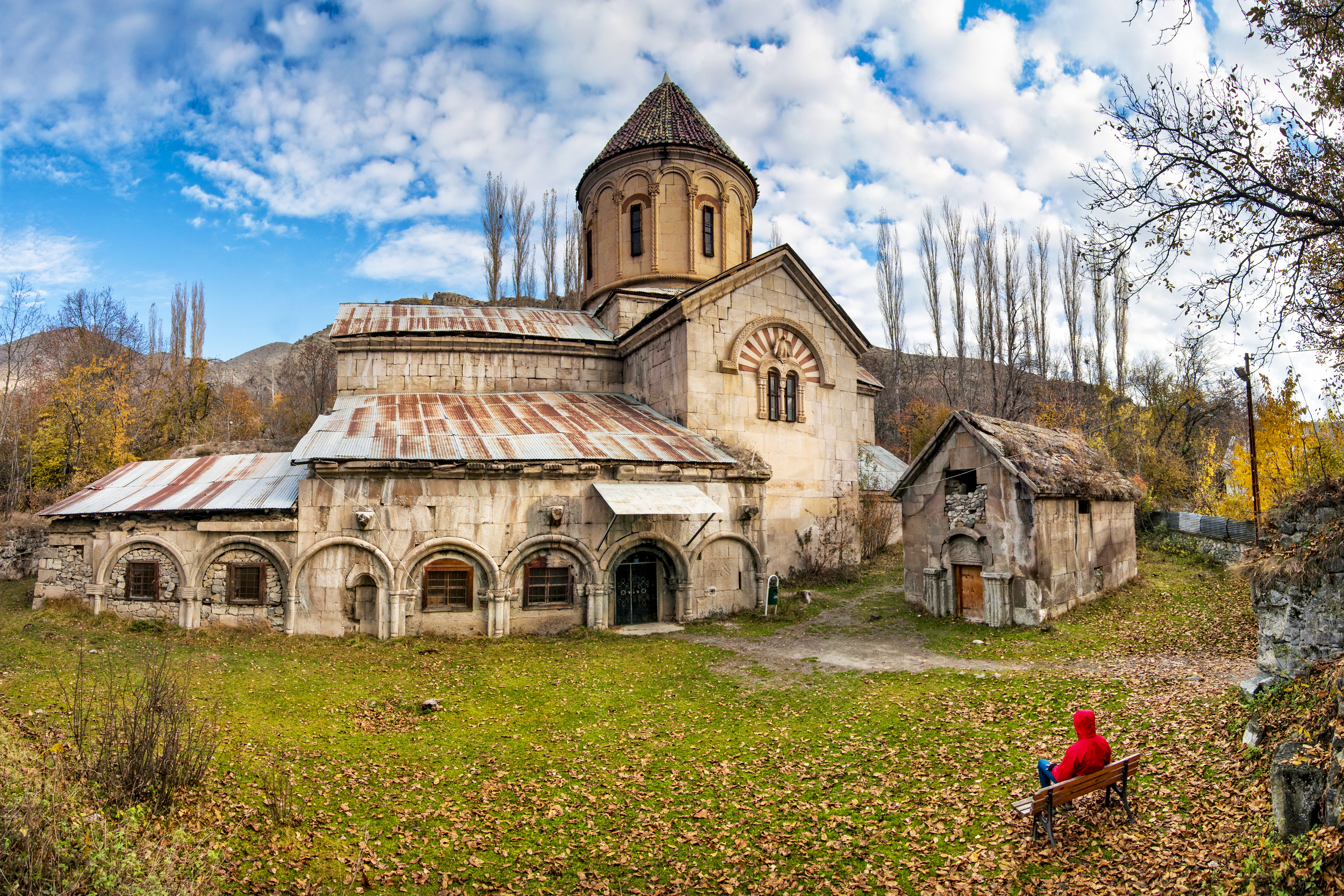

Religion
- Affiliation: Sunni Islam (formerly Georgian Orthodox)

Location
- Location: Bağbaşı village, province of Erzurum, Northeast Turkey (historic Georgian principality of Tao)
- Interactive map of Khakhuli Monastery ხახულის მონასტერი

Architecture
- Type: Monastery, Church
- Style: domed church, croix libre type
- Groundbreaking: tenth century
- Completed: late tenth / early eleventh century

Khakhuli Monastery (Georgian: ხახულის მონასტერი [χäχulis̪ mo̞n̪äs̪tʼe̞ɾi], Turkish: Haho/Bağbaşi) was a Georgian Orthodox monastery in historical Medieval Georgian Kingdom of Tao (modern-day Turkey), in one of the gorges of the Tortum river. The main church is now used as a mosque.

Khakhuli was a very important centre of literature and Georgian culture and many Georgian scholars and theologians studied and worked in Khakhuli including Basil of Khakhuli, Ioane Khakhuleli, Davit Tbileli, and Giorgi Mtatsmindeli.

== History ==
Khakhuli Monastery was founded in the second half of the 10th century by King David III Kurapalates and later the community advanced into an economically advanced region including 300 villages and 30 independent minor feudal lords. In the 16th century, prior to the Ottoman conquest of southern Georgian territories, Khakhuli was part of Kartli Catholicate and after the Ottoman conquest of Tao, Khakhuli got isolated from Georgia.

== Khakhuli Church ==
Monastic complex includes Khakhuli Church, Georgian cross-dome church reflecting the early cross-dome style of architecture.

=== Dome ===
The Khakhuli Church has a dome with arcs, which is supported by the apse corners and two free-standing piers.

=== Specifications ===
Interior, windows, as well as the facades of the church is adorned with ornaments. The west arm is divided into three "naves" and the east arm terminates in a semicircular apse, flanked with one compartment on each side, also topped with small apses.

The south window has an interesting decoration: it is topped with radial rays formed of stones of two colors and between the arches of the paired window an image of an eagle can be seen.

The drum is furnished with twisted, paired shafts and the arches relying on them.

=== Treasures of Kakhuli ===
An Iconic 12th-century triptych Icon of the Mother of God created at the Khakhuli Monastery is one of Georgia's finest examples of medieval Georgian goldsmithery, and is now located in the Art Museum of Georgia. Also, there are several small chapels around the Church, within the circuit wall, one of which dates from the 10th century.

== Gallery ==
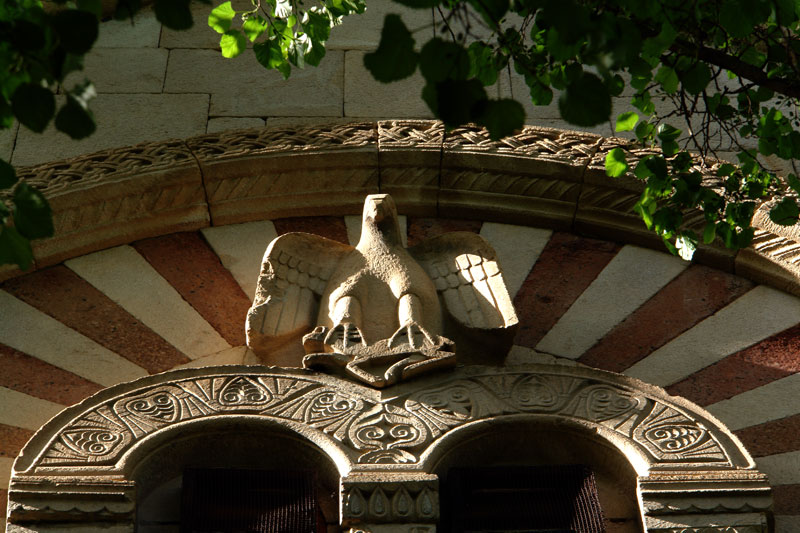
Statue of an eagle holding a roe

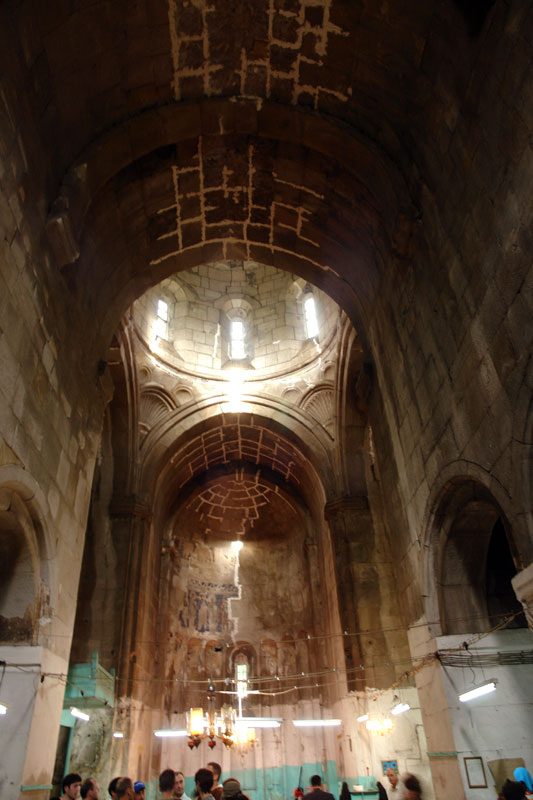
Inside interior

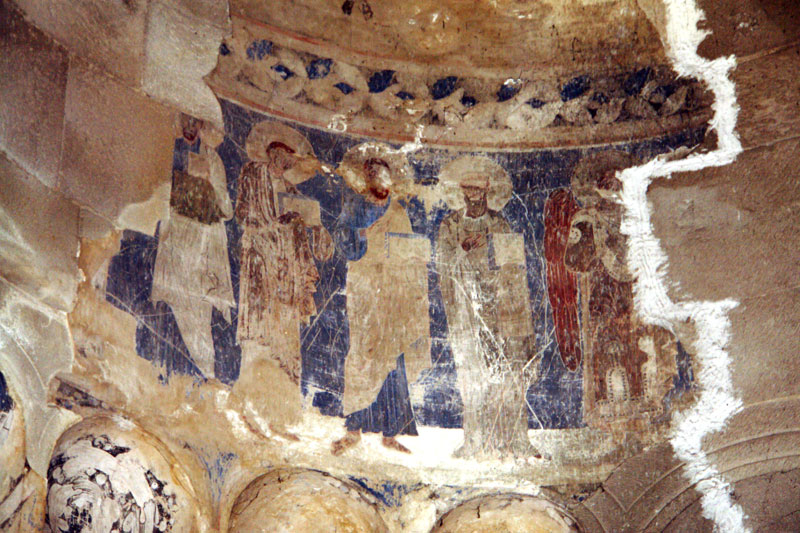
Fresco

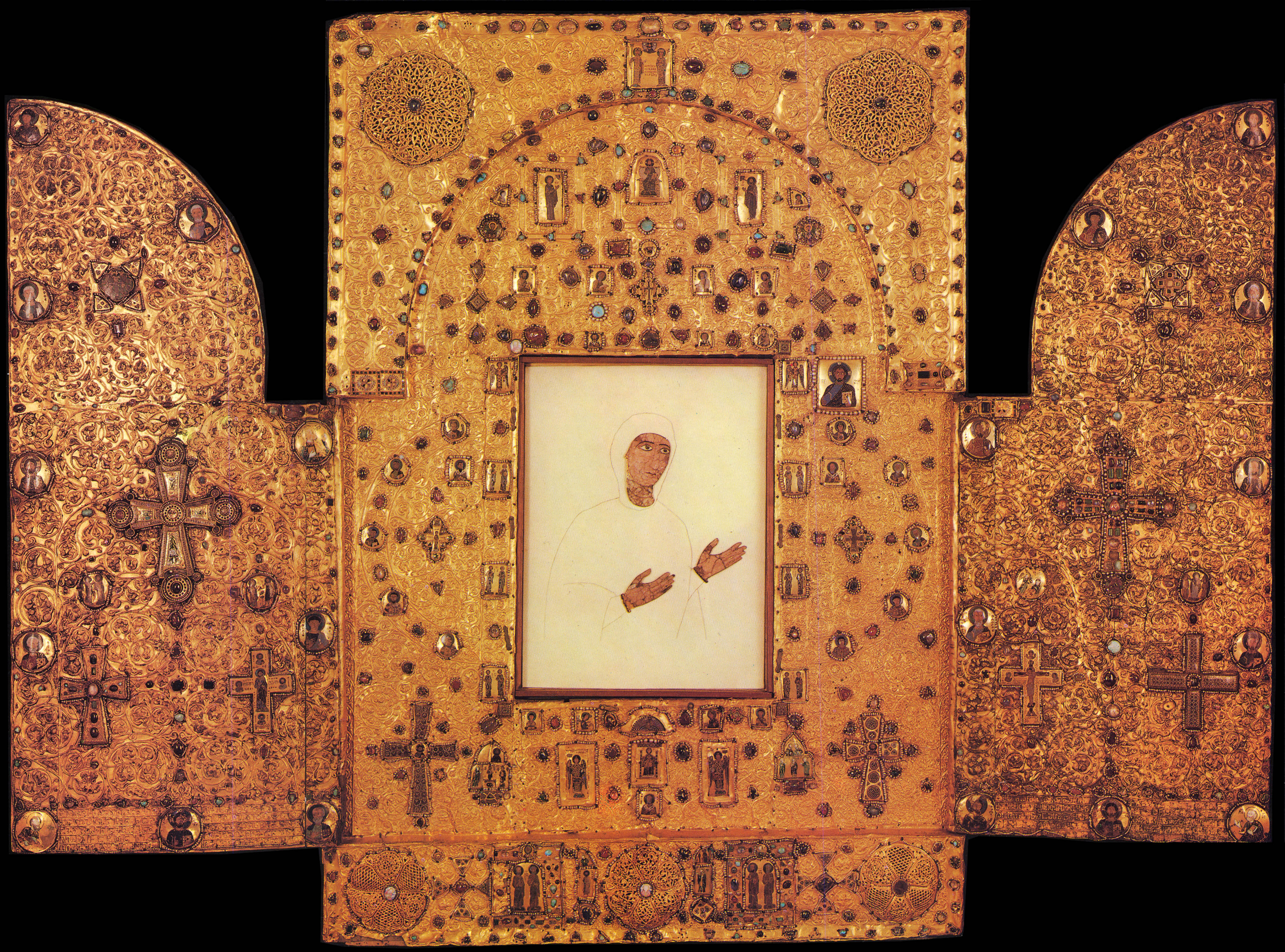
The Khakhuli triptych, an iconic Georgian Triptych created here

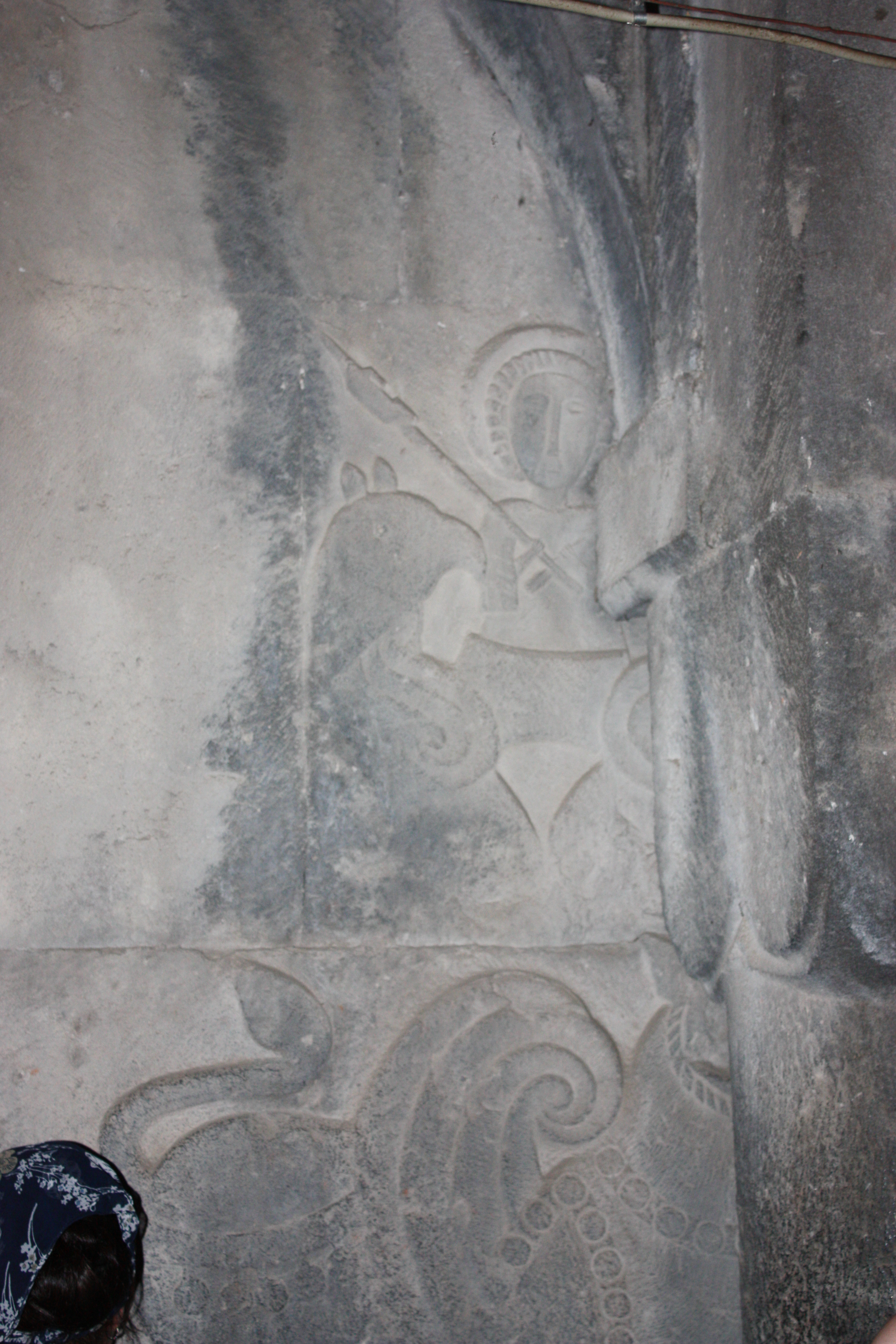
The aerial flight of Alexander the Great
