= Zemo Kartli =

Zemo Kartli ზემო ქართლი
- Historical Region
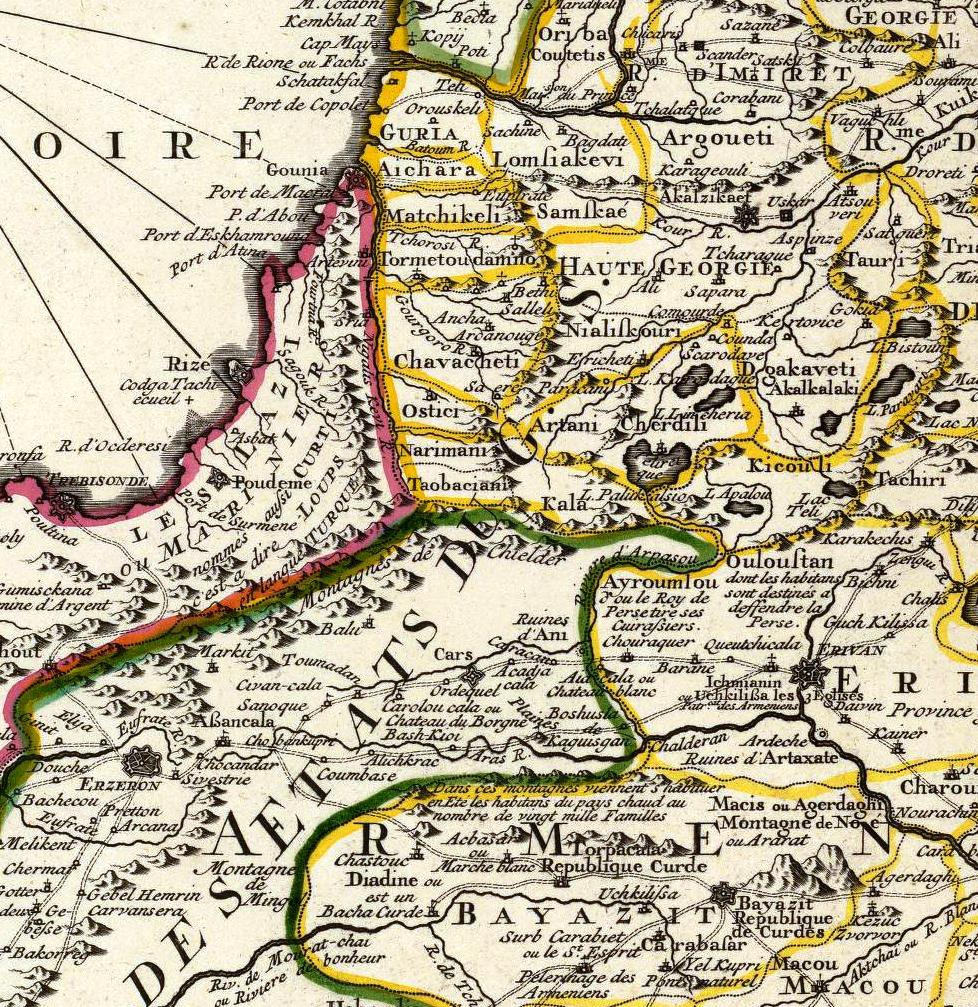
- Haute Georgie (Upper Georgia)
- Country: Georgia

Zemo Kartli (Georgian: ზემო ქართლი; lit. Upper Kartli or Upper Iberia) is a historical region in south-western Georgia, comprising the lands in the upper basin of the Kura River (from origins of Kura River to Tashiskari) and Chorokhi River basin, making it subregion of greater Kartli. Until 16th century, Zemo Kartli included: Samtskhe, Javakheti, Erusheti, Artaani, Kola, Klarjeti, Shavsheti, Tao and Speri.

== Literature ==
- (in Georgian) Javakhishvili, Ivane (1968), k'art'veli eris istoria (The History of the Georgian Nation), vol. 2. Tbilisi State University Press.
- Muskhelishvili, David (1979), Georgian Soviet Encyclopedia, vol. 4, pp. 511. Tbilisi.
