= Gurgen II of Tao =

Gurgen II გურგენ II

Duke of Upper Tao
- Reign: 918 – 941
- Predecessor: Ashot
- Successor: Bagrat I
- Dynasty: Bagrationi
- Father: Adarnase III of Tao
- Religion: Eastern Orthodox Church

Gurgen II "the Great" (Georgian: გურგენ II დიდი, Gurgen Didi) (died February 14, 941) was a Georgian prince of the Bagratid dynasty of Tao-Klarjeti and hereditary ruler of Tao with the title of eristavt-eristavi, "duke of dukes". He also bore the Byzantine title of magistros.

The son of Adarnase III of Tao, Gurgen succeeded on the death of his paternal uncle Ashot Kukhi in 918. He features prominently in the medieval Georgian sources, being nicknamed as "the Great". A patron of local monastic communities, Gurgen presided over the construction of a new cathedral at Khandzta.

Gurgen was an energetic ruler and accumulated in his hands much power, ruling over Tao, parts of Klarjeti and Javakheti, and also Adjara and Nigali. The expansion of his territories was at the expense of his cousins and neighbours. Thus, sometime between 923 and 941, he wrested Klarjeti from his father-in-law Ashot "the Prompt", son of Bagrat I, giving him two other domains — western part of Javakheti and Adjara — in exchange. He further made a thrust at Armenian-held Samshvilde, as well.

Gurgen was married to a daughter of Ashot the Swift, member of the Bagratid line of Klarjeti. They had the only daughter who married the Abkhazian prince Bagrat, son of King Constantine III. With Gurgen’s death in 941, the Bagratid line of Tao became extinct and his state was divided among other branches of the dynasty.
