= Tao (historical region) =

Coordinates: 40.3°N 41.5°E

Tao Georgian: ტაო
- Historical region
- Boundaries of Tao shown within the modern territorial division
- Country: Turkey
- Historical period: 4th century BC – present
- Subregions: Oltisi, Tortumi, Parkhali
- Historical states: Iberian Kingdom (4th–2nd century BC); Greater Armenia (2nd century BC – 1st century AD); Iberia (1st century AD - 428); Mamikonian Principality (428 – 770s); Iberia (Tao-Klarjeti) (786 – 1001); Byzantine Empire (Theme of Iberia) (1001 – 1074); Kingdom of Georgia (1074 – 15th century); Samtskhe-Saatabago (15th century – 1550s); Ottoman Empire (1550s – 1878); Russian Empire (1878 – 1918); Democratic Republic of Georgia (1918 – 1921); Republic of Turkey (since 1921)

Tao (Georgian: ტაო) is a historical region of Georgia and forms part of the wider historical area of Tao-Klarjeti. Geographically, the region lay in the middle basin of the Çoruh River and broadly corresponded to the historical Armenian province of Tayk. In modern administrative terms, its territory largely overlaps with the Yusufeli district of Artvin Province, as well as several northern districts of Erzurum Province, including Uzundere, Olur, Oltu, Şenkaya, Narman, and Tortum.

== Name ==
The name of the region preserves the ethnonym of the ancient tribe known as the Taochi, who inhabited this area in antiquity.

Earlier forms of the name appear as Diauehi or Daiaeni, which are attested in Assyrian cuneiform inscriptions of the 12th–9th centuries BC and in Urartian inscriptions of the 9th–8th centuries BC.

After the 760s BC, the name Diauehi disappears from written sources; however, it is widely considered to have survived in later ethnonyms and toponyms, including Tao in Georgian tradition, Taochi in Greek sources, and Daikh or Tayk in Armenian historiography.

== History ==
=== Early period ===
The Çoruh River basin (Tao includes the middle reaches of the Çoruh River, as well as its tributaries, the Oltu and Tortum)

According to the studies of Nikolai Marr, the Chans originally occupied a much wider territory, including the Çoruh River basin and its right-bank tributaries, from which they were temporarily displaced—first by Armenians and later by Georgians. According to Ivane Javakhishvili, from ancient times Tao and the neighboring region of İspir were inhabited by Georgian tribes of Laz or Chalybes. By contrast, Igor M. Diakonoff proposed that the earliest population of the region may originally have been Hurrian-speaking and was later gradually Kartvelianized (more precisely, Chanized), after which the area became a zone of intensive Armeno–Chan interaction.

Kingdom of Iberia; Iberian territories seized by Artaxiad Armenia in the early 2nd century BC

The region and its inhabitants—most notably the Chalybes, Taochi, and Phasians—are described in the Anabasis of Xenophon, who passed the area with the Ten Thousand in the 4th century BC. Based on this account, Robert W. Edwards concluded that the Taochi most likely inhabited the valleys of Oltu, Narman, and Tortum. At that time, like the Carduchii and Chaldians, they were a free people not subject to Persian rule, although they later came under the authority of the Iberians.

According to Cyril Toumanoff, by the 4th–3rd centuries BC the region had already become part of the ancient Georgian Kingdom of Iberia. According to Geography of Strabo (XI.14.5), in the early 2nd century BC the area was seized by Artaxiad Armenia from Iberia. Although Strabo refers specifically to the παρώρεια τοῦ Παρύαδρου ("the slopes of the Paryadres"), modern scholarship generally identifies this area with the historical region of Tao.

=== From the late 4th to the 8th centuries: the Mamikonian period ===
At some point during Late Antiquity, Tao became an appanage of the Armenian noble house of the Mamikonian. According to Robert W. Edwards, the Mamikonians were Kartvelian origin, deriving from the Chan tribe. Cyril Toumanoff similarly suggested that they originated either from the Chans or from the Laz. Over time, the Chans were gradually absorbed into the Mamikonian principality. The residence of the Mamikonian branch ruling Tao was located at the fortress of Erahani, the precise location of which remains unknown.

Armenian sources allow the history of the Mamikonian family to be traced from the early 4th century AD onward. Their integration into Armenia and the gradual incorporation of Tao into the Armenian political sphere occurred through military alliances, dynastic marriages, and the acquisition of hereditary offices granted by the Armenian monarchy.

According to Nina Garsoïan, Tao-Tayk may have been evangelized as early as the time of Gregory the Illuminator. An Arabic translation of the 5th-century historian Agathangelos recounts how Gregory sent bishops to Basiani, Speri, and Kola, in later interpretations, this reference to Kola has sometimes been understood as extending to Tao as well. However, Armenian sources only from the late 6th century, following the peace of 591, provide the earliest clear evidence for treating Tao-Tayk and Kola collectively under a single regional name. (Note: The regional perception of Kola also differed between Armenian and Georgian traditions. As noted by Bruno Baumgartner, Armenian authors generally regarded the Kola highlands as belonging to the province of Tao-Tayk, whereas Georgian sources never considered Kola to be part of Tao. At the same time, Robert H. Hewsen observes that in early Armenian sources Kola (or Kogh) was not originally treated as a constituent part of Tao-Tayk.) Georgian ecclesiastical tradition attributes the earliest missionary activity in Tao to Andrew the Apostle, who is said to have preached in the "lands of Kartli". According to The Georgian Chronicles, after performing miracles in Samtskhe and leaving an icon of the Virgin Mary there, Andrew continued his mission into Tao.

=== Persian rule and ecclesiastical division ===
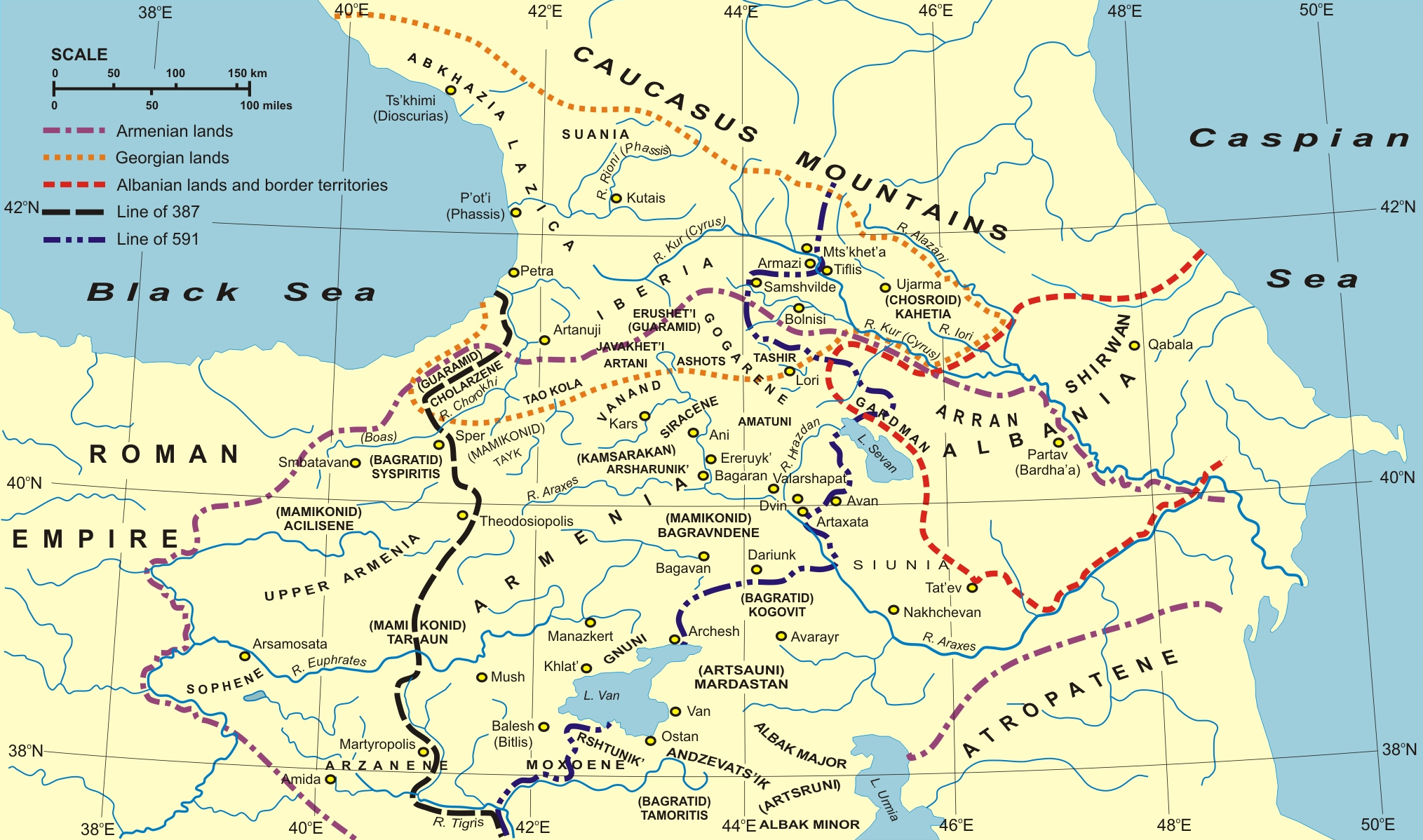
Transcaucasia in the 4th-6th centuries according to the Cambridge Ancient History.

Following the Partition of Armenia in 387, Tao fell within the Persian sphere of influence, while its western frontier functioned as a border zone between the Byzantine Empire and the Sasanian Empire. This frontier represented not only a political boundary but also an ideological divide between Christianity and Zoroastrianism.

Tao-Tayk remained within the boundaries of the Armenian kingdom—later reduced to a Sasanian vassal—and subsequently within the Marzpanate of Armenia After the extinction of the Armenian royal line in 428, the Mamikonian family—whose principal rivals were the Bagratuni—pursued an increasingly independent foreign policy, alternately aligning with Byzantium or Persia.

In 450, Tao participated in the Armenian uprising against Persian rule, culminating in the Battle of Avarayr. During the revolt in Tao-Tayk, mountaineers from Chaldia joined local guerrilla forces to oppose Persian columns advancing toward the Byzantine frontier. Leadership of the local resistance was assumed by Amayak Mamikonian, together with Arten Kabelean and Varaz-Shapuh Paluni; the movement was ultimately suppressed by Vasak Siwni, who led a Persian punitive expedition in the region.

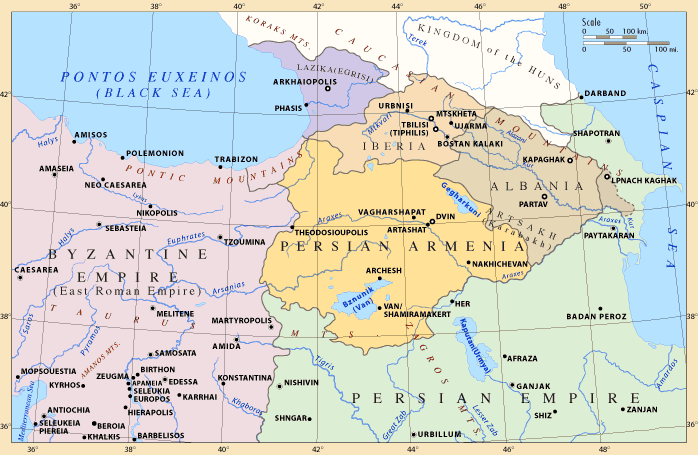
The area of Armenia under Persian rule

According to Robert W. Edwards, during the Artaxiad and Arsacid periods, as well as under Persian suzerainty (c. 387–591), the northwestern boundary of Tao extended to the Çoruh River, where the population was likely predominantly Georgian. Robert H. Hewsen similarly argued that during the Mamikonian period Tao and Kola were largely Georgian districts, while Bolkha and its surrounding districts may have been predominantly Armenian. Both Edwards and Hewsen criticized nationalist interpretations portraying Tao-Tayk as solely Armenian or Georgian.

The acts of the Second Council of Dvin (555) constitute the last known historical document to mention an Armenian bishop from Tao-Tayk. According to Nikoloz Aleksidze, by the late 6th or early 7th century Tao had adopted the Chalcedonian tradition and ceased to fall under the authority of the Armenian Church of Persarmenia, suggesting possible Georgian ecclesiastical jurisdiction over the region during this period.

Borders and division of Tao-Tayk according to the "Armenian Geography" of the 7th century.

=== Byzantine influence and Arab invasions ===
As a result of the Byzantine–Sasanian War of 572–591, Emperor Maurice reorganized Armenia, bringing Tao under Byzantine control in 591. According to Cyril Toumanoff, Tao-Tayk became part of the Byzantine province known as Deep Armenia (Armenia Profunda), which consisted of three districts. This view, however, is not universally accepted: Robert Edwards argues that there is no clear evidence that Tao-Tayk itself was ever formally renamed Deep Armenia. Nina G. Garsoian observes that Armenian sources following the peace of 591 provide the earliest evidence for treating Tao, Kola, and Bolkha as a single, unified region under a common name — Tayk. Moreover, as noted by Hewsen, before the Byzantine reorganization Kola may have existed as a separate principality rather than as an integral part of Tayk.

Following the military campaigns of Emperor Heraclius during the subsequent Byzantine–Sasanian War of 602–628, the Kingdom of Iberia lost the coastal territory of Klarjeti—including the cantons of Nigali and Murguli in the lower Çoruh basin—as well as the "land of Tukharis", which was incorporated into Tao.

At least part of Tao appears to have been granted as an appanage to a cadet branch of the Mamikonian family in the 6th century. Between the 6th and 7th centuries, the secondary branch of the Dimaksian dynasty, based in eastern Tao, established the independent principality of Bolkha/Bukha (known in Georgian sources as Bugatakuri). Northeast of Bolkha was the principality of Kola, governed by local native rulers bearing the same name. The Mamikonians, the Dimaksians, and other lesser independent or semi-independent feudal lords in the region maintained their own armed retinues and banners. According to the Zoranamak (military list), Tao-Tayk was credited with maintaining a military retinue of approximately 1,000 retainers, although the source does not explicitly mention the presence of the Mamikonians in the region.

In 607, the Third Council of Dvin condemned the Council of Chalcedon and the Tome of Leo. As a result, a number of Chalcedonian dissidents migrated either to Tao—which lay within the Iberian political sphere—or to the Byzantine Empire. Bishops who refused to submit to the authority of Catholicos Abraham sought refuge in Tao thus escaped the jurisdiction of the Catholicosate of Dvin, as Tao lay outside Persian territory. According to Gérard Garitte, these clerics may have been more closely dependent on the Georgian Church than on the Armenian Church.

Following the Arab conquests of the South Caucasus, the emirate of Arminiya was established and administratively divided into four regions. In Arabic sources, Tao was known as Sirāj Ṭayr (Note: In Arabic geographical texts from the period of the Abbasid Caliphate, Tao was known under the name Sirāj Ṭayr (سراج طير), a designation that reflects an Arabic adaptation and conflation of the Armenian toponyms Shirak and Tayk. Due to phonetic distortion in Arabic usage, these two regions were often treated as a single province in medieval Islamic geographical literature.) and formed part of either Arminiya III or Arminiya II. From the mid-7th century until 772, the Mamikonians ruled Tao under the suzerainty of the Arab Caliphate. The Arab invasions of the 7th century marked the collapse of the traditionally pro-Byzantine Mamikonians, who ultimately lost most of their lands and political influence.

Political map of the Caucasus, circa 740, after the end of the Arab-Khazar conflict and the consolidation of Umayyad power in Transcaucasia.

The Armenian Catholicos Nerses III the Builder spent six years in exile in Tao-Tayk after leaving Dvin in 654. Under Byzantine rule, two major churches were constructed at Bana and Ishkhani; the church at Ishkhani was founded by Nerses III himself. Both churches were destroyed following the Arab invasions. In the early 9th century, they were restored and converted into episcopal centers by Georgian clerics Saba of Ishkhani and Kvireke of Bana.

During the 8th century, the region was devastated twice: first in 735 during the campaign of the Arab general Marwan II, and again in 774–775 during an anti-Arab uprising. The failure of this revolt had catastrophic consequences for the Mamikonians, who lost Tao—largely to the Bagratuni and partly to Iberia.

In the 770s, Ashot Msaker subdued Shirak and Abotsi and advanced into Tao, where he built the fortress of Kalmakhi and made it his residence. According to René Grousset, Ashot played a role in the Armenization of the borderlands by settling colonists from Aliovit and Arsharunik in the ethnically contested province of Tao-Tayk, which remained under strong Iberian and Byzantine influence. During this period, the Armenian Gnuni family also settled in Tao.

=== From the 8th to the 10th centuries: the rise of the Iberian Bagratids ===
According to Cyril Toumanoff, after 772 Tao-Tayk, which at that time belonged to the Mamikonian family, was divided into two parts. Upper Tao was acquired by the Bagratids, while Lower Tao, together with Asispori, passed to the Guaramids. Between approximately 786 and 807, Lower Tao—together with Asispori in Upper Tao—came under the control of the Iberian Bagratids. By 813, Tao was fully reunified. From this point onward, the region shifted from the Armenian political sphere into the Georgian one.

In the late 8th century, as a result of Arab campaigns, local Georgian dynasties were destroyed and central Kartli fell under Arab control. The Principality of Iberia was dissolved, and several independent political entities emerged in its place. Fleeing Arab pressure, Ashot I of Iberia (known as Ashot Kurapalates) took refuge in southwestern Georgia, where he founded the principality of Tao-Klarjeti. He received the Byzantine title of kouropalates from the emperor and, with Byzantine support, initiated the political and cultural revival of the region.

From the reign of Ashot Kurapalates onward, monastic construction expanded rapidly, beginning with the activities of Gregory of Khandzta and reaching even greater scales under Ashot's successors. The Life of Grigol of Khandzta describes Tao as largely desolate at the time of its resettlement by Georgians. In interpreting this text, Viada Arutjunova-Fidanjan argued that Georgian monks in Tao were surrounded by an Armenian population and that the earliest Georgian monasteries were founded on the sites of ruined Armenian monasteries. This interpretation was challenged by Wachtang Djobadze, who emphasized that the text indicates devastation caused by Arab invasions and such severe depopulation that Gregory reportedly struggled to find laborers for church construction.

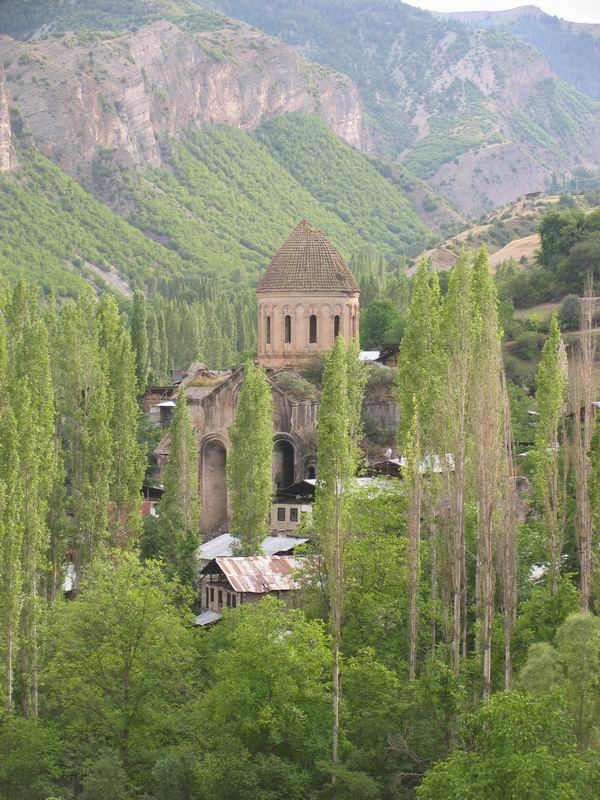
Orthodox cathedral of Oshki (958–964)

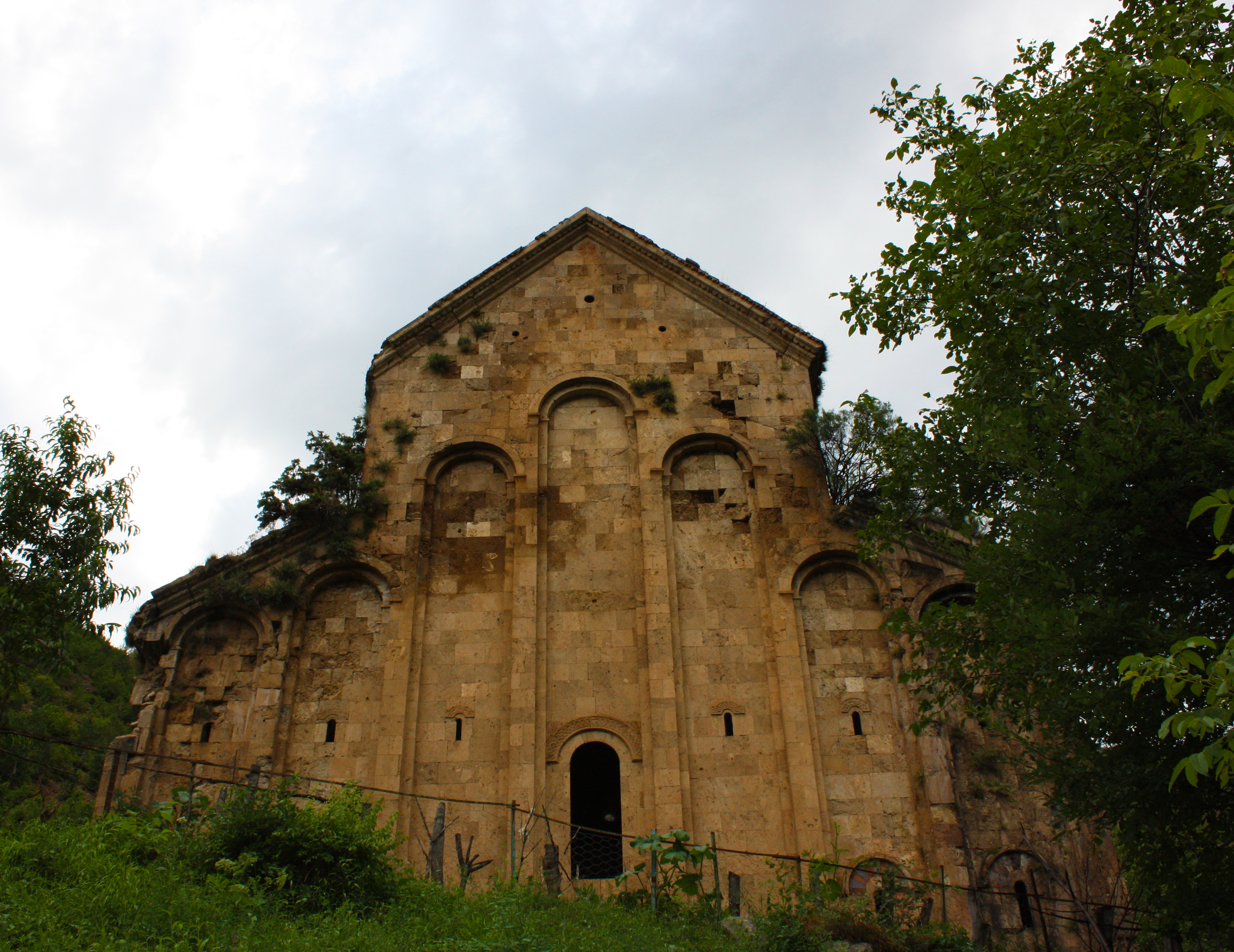
Ruins of the church of Otkhta Eklesia (Church of the Four), 10th century

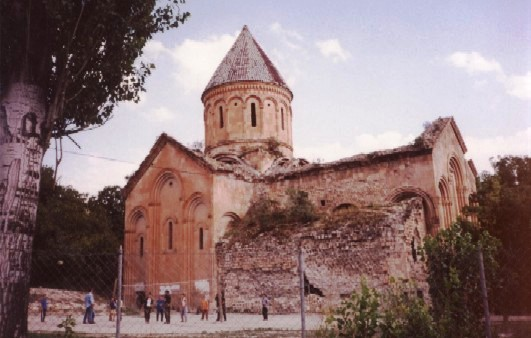
Orthodox cathedral of Ishkhani, 9th century

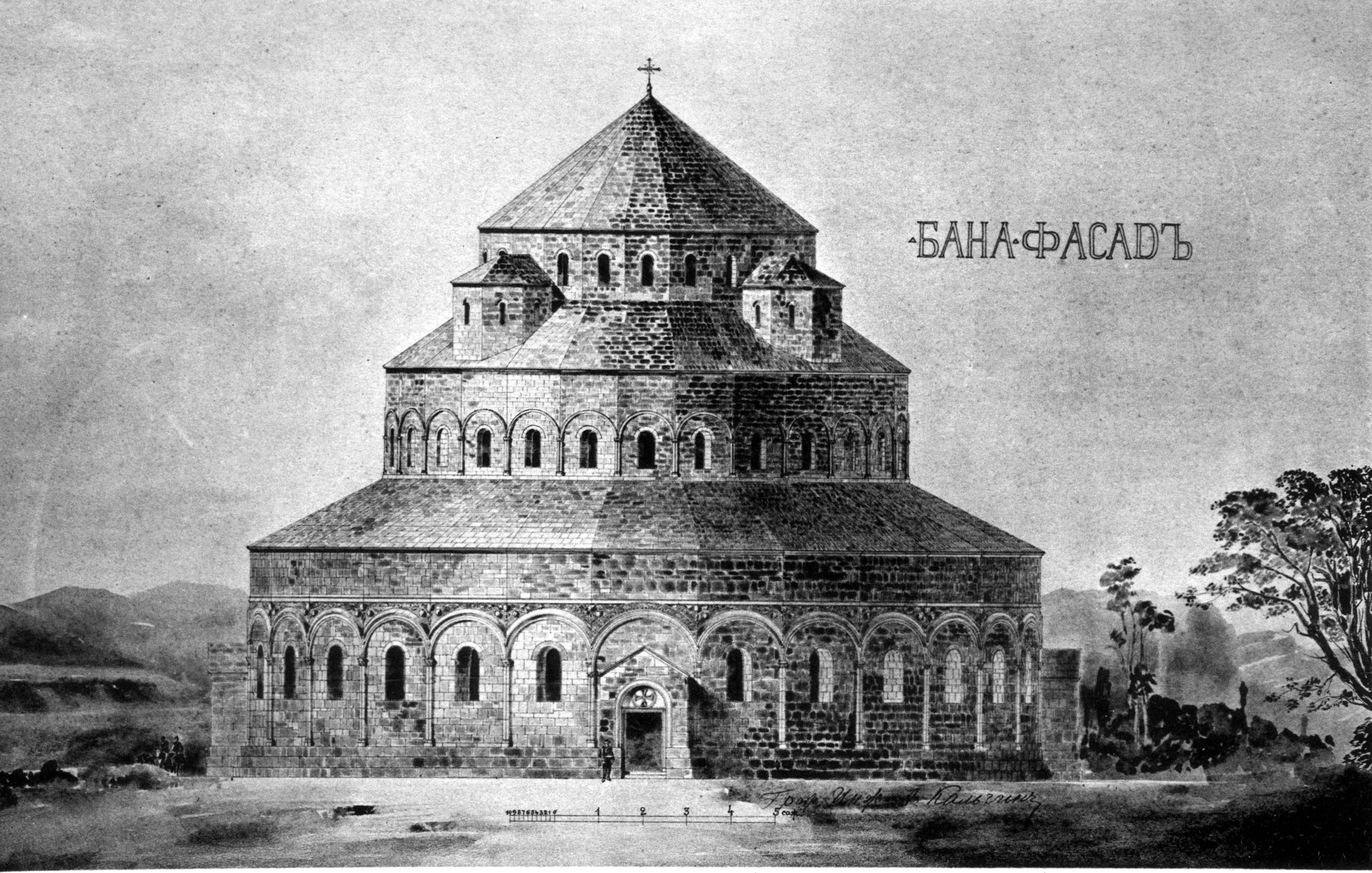
Reconstruction drawing of Bana Cathedral, c. 881–923
Тао

City Church or monastery	Cathedral Castle or fortress

Ashot's legacy was divided among several branches of the Bagratid family. Over time, they were divided into the Tao and Klarjeti branches, with the Tao branch later subdividing further. The Bagratids of Tao-Klarjeti bore not only Georgian titles but also Byzantine dignities, including kouropalates, magistros, and anthypatos–patrikios. In 888, Adarnase IV, a member of the Tao branch, restored the Georgian kingship. From that point onward, the title "King of the Georgians" became predominant among the Tao-Klarjeti Bagratids, although the title of kouropalates retained particular importance in relations with Byzantium.

After the death of Gurgen II, the senior branch of Upper Tao gradually became extinct, and its possessions were transferred to the Lower Tao branch. David III of Tao emerged as the most prominent representative of this lineage.

=== From the 11th to the 12th centuries: Georgian–Byzantine wars and Turkish invasions ===
After the death of David III of Tao, the Byzantine emperor Basil II reached a reconciliation with Bagrat III of Georgia, and the two sides concluded agreements concerning Tao. As a result, the southern part of Tao passed under Byzantine control, while the northern part—Lower Tao—remained in Bagrat's possession. This division contributed to a northward shift of Georgia's political center and elite.

Having consolidated these territories, Basil II established the Theme of Iberia. The exact date of its creation is uncertain and generally placed between 1001 and 1022, when the emperor finally secured Tao following his Georgian campaigns of 1014–1023. After the unsuccessful campaign of George I of Georgia, both Upper and Lower Tao came under full Byzantine control. Although Georgian rulers made several attempts to regain Tao (in 1001, 1014, and 1021–1022), there is no evidence that the local Georgian population was initially oppressed under the new military administration.

In 1034, Bagrat IV of Georgia recovered a substantial part of Lower Tao. The rebellious feudal lord Liparit IV of Kldekari, with Byzantine support, temporarily seized Tao, but he was captured by the royalist duke Sula Kalmakheli and handed over to Bagrat IV.

Under Byzantine rule, Tao was defended not only by regular imperial garrisons but also by local inhabitants, who in return received state lands exempt from taxation. This arrangement deteriorated around 1053, when Emperor Constantine IX Monomachos disbanded the so-called "Iberian army", reportedly numbering about 50,000 men, and imposed taxes in place of military service. These measures contributed to growing dissatisfaction among the local population toward Byzantine authorities.

In its final phase, the Theme of Iberia comprised Tao, Basiani, and Kars. In 1064, during a campaign in Georgia, the Seljuk ruler Alp Arslan advanced with his forces into the Tao–Panaskerti area. In 1074, Gregory Pakourianos resigned as commander-in-chief of the imperial forces in the East and transferred several territories—including Theodosiopolis, Oltu, Kars, Vanand, Karnipori, and part of Tao—to the Georgian king George II of Georgia. By 1075, these territories had been largely cleared of Turkish detachments.

=== From the 13th to the 16th centuries: within the Kingdom of Georgia and Samtskhe-Saatabago ===
Some historians associate the formation of the duchy of Tao with the reign of Bagrat IV of Georgia, identifying Vache Karichisdze as its first eristavi (duke). This view, however, is not shared by M. Bakhtadze, who argues that at that time a portion of Tao remained under direct royal control. Bakhtadze also does not exclude the existence of the duchy of Tukharisi within Tao, which is attested in sources from the 11th century.

At various points, southern (Upper) Tao—despite having a substantial Georgian population—fell under the control of the Saltukids and the Seljuks of Erzurum. Nevertheless, the local Georgian princes who exercised authority in the region declared their loyalty to the Bagrationi dynasty. In 1124, during a campaign against the Seljuks, David IV of Georgia advanced into southern (Upper) Tao and transferred the Khakhuli triptych from the Khakhuli to Gelati Monastery.

In 1191, during the reign of Tamar of Georgia, a local nobleman named Guzan joined the rebellion of Yury Bogolyubsky. After the defeat of the rebels, Zakaria Panaskerteli was appointed the first eristavi of Tao. The Duchy of Tao existed from the 1190s until the 1460s. Known eristavis of Tao include Zakaria Panaskerteli (late 12th century), Taka Panaskerteli (late 13th–early 14th centuries), and Zaza Panaskerteli (15th century). After the Georgian victory over Suleiman II of Rum at the Battle of Basiani, the monasteries of Khakhuli, Oshki, and Bana Cathedral were liberated.

Following the Mongol invasions of Georgia and the weakening of the Georgian state, the Ayyubid dynasty, the Sultanate of Rum, and the rulers of Ahlat competed for control over Tao. From the second half of the 13th century, the region formed part of Samtskhe-Saatabago. A large Turkmen army was defeated near Bana under the command of Ivane I Jaqeli (also known as Kvarkvare Tsikhisjvareli), and later the mandaturtukhutsesi Beka I Jaqeli won a decisive victory over the forces of Azat Musa. The eristavi Taka Panaskerteli distinguished himself by resisting enemy forces near the fortress of Tortomi with a small contingent. From the 14th century, Tao was part of a reunified Georgian kingdom. It appears that the later Taka—whose troops entrenched themselves in Tortomi—was a grandson of this eristavi and took part in resisting Timur during his seventh campaign against Georgia in 1401.

In 1466, the leader of the Aq Qoyunlu, Uzun Hasan, launched a military campaign against Georgia, proclaiming a ghazi (holy war). During this campaign, Tao was invaded, and the fortress of Samagar as well as castles in the Tortum Valley were captured. From the second half of the 15th century, following the Disintegration of the Kingdom of Georgia, Tao remained within Samtskhe-Saatabago.

=== Later period ===
By the late 1550s, the western territories of Samtskhe-Saatabago, including Tao, were incorporated into the Ottoman Empire as a result of the Ottoman campaign led by Ahmed Pasha. During this period, under the reign of Suleiman the Magnificent (r. 1520–1566), the Ottomans introduced a new administrative structure in Tao: Tortum, Mamravan, and Oltisi were organized as sanjaks, while Khakhuli was designated as a nahiyah. The Ottoman authorities placed the administration of the Christian population of Tao—including the Kars–Erzurum area—under the jurisdiction of the Armenian Patriarchate of Constantinople.

In the 18th century, the Georgian geographer and historian Prince Vakhushti of Kartli described Tao in detail in his Geography of Georgia, outlining its boundaries, terrain, and agricultural character. He depicted Tao as a mountainous and well-watered region, rich in vineyards, fruit, and grain, with settlements concentrated in valleys and gorges.

In 1878, part of Tao—specifically Oltu—was occupied by the Russian Empire and incorporated into the Kars oblast. As a result of these political changes, much of the Muslim Georgian population of Tao was resettled into the interior regions of Turkey. Today, the Tao dialect of Georgian survives only in a limited number of villages in the Parkhali Valley.

== See also ==
- Tao-Klarjeti
- Diauehi
- Tayk

== Bibliography ==
- Aleksidze, Nikoloz (2024). Sanctity, Gender and Authority in Medieval Caucasia. Edinburgh University Press. doi:10.1515/9781474498630. ISBN 978-1-4744-9863-0.
- Bakhtadze, Mikhail (2004). The Institution of Eristavs in Georgia (in Georgian). Tbilisi: Tbilisi State University.
- Edwards, Robert W. (1985). "Medieval Architecture in the Oltu–Penek Valley: A Preliminary Report on the Marchlands of Northeast Turkey". Dumbarton Oaks Papers. 39: 15–37. doi:10.2307/1291514. ISSN 0070-7546. JSTOR 1291514.
- Edwards, Robert W. (1988). "The Vale of Kola: A Final Preliminary Report on the Marchlands of Northeast Turkey". Dumbarton Oaks Papers. 42: 138. ISSN 0070-7546.
- Faustus of Byzantium; Nina G. Garsoian (1989). The Epic Histories Attributed to Pʻawstos Buzand. Cambridge, Mass.: Harvard University Press. ISBN 0-674-25865-7.
- Gamkrelidze, Gela (2013). Topo-Archaeological Dictionary of Kartlis Tskhovreba (in Georgian). et al. Tbilisi: Sulakauri Publishing. ISBN 978-9941-15-896-4.
- Garsoïan, Nina G. (1991). "Taykʿ / Tao". In Kazhdan, Alexander P. (ed.). The Oxford Dictionary of Byzantium. Vol. 3. Oxford University Press.
- Grousset, René (1995). Histoire de l'Arménie: des origines à 1071. Grande Bibliothèque Payot (in French). Paris: Payot. ISBN 978-2-228-88912-4.
- Hewsen, Robert H. (1992). The Geography of Ananias of Širak (Ašxarhacʿoycʿ). Wiesbaden: Reichert Verlag. ISBN 978-3-88226-485-2.
- Ingorokva, Pavle I. (1954). Giorgi Merchule (in Georgian).
- Kudava, Buba; Saitidze, Gocha (2018). Tao-Klarjeti: Historical and Cultural Essays. Tbilisi: Artanuji Publishing. p. 548. ISBN 978-9941-478-72-7.
- Muskhelishvili, D. (1977–1980). Basic Problems of the Historical Geography of Georgia (in Georgian). Vol. 1–2.
- Muskhelishvili, D. (1985). Georgian Soviet Encyclopedia (in Georgian). Vol. 9. p. 658.
- Sagona, A. G. (2004). Archaeology at the North-East Anatolian Frontier, Vol. I: An Historical Geography and a Field Survey of the Bayburt Province. Leuven: Peeters Press. ISBN 90-429-1390-8.
- Topchishvili, Roland (2017). Historical and Ethnographic Overview of Georgia and Georgians in Turkey (in Georgian). Tbilisi: Universal Publishing. ISBN 978-9941-22-974-9.
- Toumanoff, Cyril (1959). "Introduction to Christian Caucasian History: The Formative Centuries (IVth–VIIIth)". Traditio. 15: 1–106. ISSN 0362-1529.
- Toumanoff, Cyril (1963). Studies in Christian Caucasian History. Washington, D.C.: Georgetown University Press.
