= Abotsi =

Coordinates: 41.03°N 43.85°E

Abotsi (Armenian: Աշոցք, Georgian: აბოცი), ancient historical-geographical province of Armenia and Georgia. located south to Javakheti, in modern-day Armenia. In the late medieval period, as a result of influx of Turkoman tribes Abotsi was called Kaikuli, which was later one of the Sadrosho of Kartli Kingdom, ruled by Mouravi. In 1801, when Russia annexed eastern Georgia (Kingdom of Kartli-Kakheti), Kaikuli (Abotsi) was included into Lori district of Georgian Governorate. In 1849, district was transferred to newly established Erivan Governorate.

== See also ==
- Basiani
- Klarjeti
