= Tao-Klarjeti =

Tao-Klarjeti may refer to:

- Tao-Klarjeti, part of Georgian historical region of Upper Kartli
- Kingdom of Tao-Klarjeti, AD 888 to 1008
