= Georgian Orthodox Church in Turkey =

Overview of Georgian Orthodox Churches in the Republic of Turkey

Eparchies of the Georgian Apostolic Autocephalous Orthodox Church as of 2010.

The Georgian Orthodox Church is a major part of Orthodox Christianity in Turkey. Georgian churches in Turkey, namely in Artvin, Ardahan, Kars, and Erzurum, are under the jurisdiction of Batumi and Lazeti, Akhaltsikhe and Tao-Klarjeti, and Akhalkalaki, Kumurdo and Kars eparchies.

== List of churches and monasteries ==
=== Northeast Turkey ===
Church name	Picture	Status
Oshki (Öşk Vank/Çamlıyamaç)		abandoned
Khakhuli Monastery (Haho/Bağbaşi)		converted into a mosque
Doliskana (Dolişhane/Hamamlıköy)		abandoned
Bana cathedral (Penek)		ruins
Tbeti Monastery (Cevizli)		ruins
Ani Georgian Church		ruins
Ishkhani (İşhan)		protected
Parkhali (Barhal/Altıparmak)		converted into a mosque
Khandzta		ruins
Ekeki		ruins
Otkhta Eklesia ((Dörtkilise))		abandoned
Parekhi		ruins
Vachedzori Monastery		ruins
Ancha monastery		ruins
Ardashen Church		ruins
Makriali Church		ruins
Pironity Church		ruins
Ts'q'arostavi (in Javakheti) monastery		ruins
Opiza		ruins
Kamhisi		ruins
Artanuji citadel church		ruins
Esbeki monastery		ruins
Sveti church		ruins
Zegani church		ruins
Ts'q'arostavi (in Klarjeti) monastery		ruins
Enirabati		ruins
Ali monastery		ruins
Leksori monastery		ruins
K'ineposi complex		ruins
Ch'ala church		converted into a mosque
Gogiuba church		ruins
Sik'iarebi church		turned into a barn
Samts'q'ari		ruins
Mamats'minda church		ruins
Chaisi church		turned into a mosque
Changli church		abandoned
Taoskari Church		ruins
Tadzarani Monastery		ruins

=== Other areas ===
Church name	Picture	Status
St. Barlaam Monastery წმ. ბარლაამის მონასტერი კასიუსის მთაზე		ruins

== See also ==
- Christianity in Turkey
