= Eparchies of the Georgian Orthodox Church =

Eparchies of the Georgian Apostolic Autocephalous Orthodox Church

As of 2014, the Georgian Orthodox Church is subdivided into fifty eparchies:

== In Georgia ==
#	Eparchy	Territory	Current head	Cathedral/Residence
1	Mtskheta-Tbilisi Eparchy	Tbilisi and Mtskheta	Shio III, Catholicos-Patriarch of All Georgia, Archbishop of Mtskheta-Tbilisi and Metropolitan Bishop of Bichvinta and Tskhum-Abkhazeti	Tbilisi Sameba Cathedral, Tbilisi Sioni Cathedral, Mtskheta Cathedral
2	Tsalka Eparchy	Tsalka;		
3	Alaverdi Eparchy	Telavi and Akhmeta	David (Makharadze), Metropolitan bishop of Alaverdi	Alaverdi Cathedral, Telavi
4	Akhalkalaki, Kumurdo and Kars Eparchy	Akhalkalaki and Ninotsminda; Turkey: Kars Province	Archbishop Nicholas (Pachuashvili)	Kumurdo Cathedral, Akhalkalaki, Ninotsminda
5	Akhaltsikhe and Tao-Klarjeti Eparchy	Akhaltsikhe, Aspindza and Adigeni; Turkey: Tao-Klarjeti	Archbishop Theodore (Chuadze)	Akhaltsikhe, Sapara Monastery
6	Batumi and Lazeti Eparchy	Batumi, Kobuleti and Khelvachauri; Turkey: Lazeti	Dimitri (Shiolashvili)	Batumi Cathedral
7	Bodbe Eparchy	Sighnaghi	Archbishop David (Tikaradze)	Bodbe Monastery, Sighnaghi
8	Bolnisi Eparchy	Bolnisi	Bishop Ephrem (Gamrekelidze)	Bolnisi Sioni Church
9	Borjomi and Bakuriani Eparchy	Borjomi	Archbishop Seraphim (Jojua)	Borjomi
10	Gori and Ateni Eparchy	Gori	Bishop Andria (Gvazava)	Gori, Ateni Sioni Church
11	Gurjaani and Velistsikhe Eparchy	Gurjaani	Bishop Euthymius (Lezhava)	Gurjaani Cathedral
12	Dmanisi and Agarak-Tashiri Eparchy	Dmanisi; Armenia: Lori Province	Bishop Zenon (Iarajuli)	Dmanisi Cathedral
13	Vani and Baghdati Eparchy	Vani and Baghdati	Archbishop Anton (Bulukhia)	Baghdati Cathedral, Vani
14	Zugdidi and Tsaishi Eparchy	Zugdidi and Tsalenjikha	Bishop Gerasime (Sharashenidze)	Zugdidi Cathedral, Tsaishi Cathedral, Tsalenjikha Cathedral
15	Tianeti and Pshav-Khevsureti Eparchy	Tianeti, Pshavi and Khevsureti	Archbishop Thadeoz (Ioramashvili)	Tianeti
16	Kakhi and Kurmukhi Eparchy	Azerbaijan: Qakh District, Balakan District, Zaqatala District, Shaki District, Kurmukhi (Saingilo)		
17	Manglisi and Tetritskaro Eparchy	Tetri tskaro	Archbishop Anania (Japaridze)	Manglisi, Tsalka
18	Margveti and Ubisi Eparchy	Zestaponi and Kharagauli	Archbishop Vakhtang (Akhvlediani)	Zestaponi, Kharagauli
19	Marneuli and Hujabi Eparchy	Marneuli	Metropolitan Athanases (Chakhvashvili)	Marneuli
20	Martkopi and Gardabani Eparchy	Gardabani		
21	Mestia and Zemo Svaneti Eparchy	Mestia	Bishop Ilarion (Kitashvili)	Mestia
22	Nekresi Eparchy	Kvareli and Lagodekhi	Metropolitan Sergi (Chekurishvili)	Nekresi Monastery, Kvareli, Lagodekhi, Qakh
23	Nikortsminda Eparchy	Ambrolauri and Oni	Archbishop Elise (Jokhadze)	Nikortsminda Cathedral, Oni, Ambrolauri
24	Nikozi and Tskhinvali Eparchy	Districts of Tskhinvali, Akhalgori, Java, Znauri	Archbishop Isaia (Chanturia)	Nikozi, Tskhinvali
25	Rustavi Eparchy	Rustavi		
26	Sagarejo and Ninotsminda Eparchy	Sagarejo	Bishop Lucas (Lomidze)	Ninotsminda, Sagarejo
27	Samtavisi and Kaspi Eparchy	Kaspi		Samtavisi Cathedral, Kaspi
28	Senaki and Chkhorotsku Eparchy	Senaki and Chkhorotsku	Bishop Shio (Mujiri)	Senaki and Chkhorotsku
29	Stepantsminda and Khevi Eparchy	Stepantsminda and Kazbegi	Bishop Peter (Tsaava)	Stepantsminda
30	Skhalta Eparchy	Keda, Shuakhevi and Khulo		Skhalta Cathedral
31	Surami and Khashuri Eparchy	Khashuri		
32	Tkibuli and Terjola Eparchy	Tkibuli and Terjola		
33	Urbnisi and Ruisi Eparchy	Kareli	Metropolitan Iobi (Akiashvili)	Urbnisi, Ruisi
34	Poti and Khobi Eparchy	Poti and Khobi	Archbishop Grigol (Berbichashvili)	Poti Cathedral, Khobi Monastery
35	Kutais-Gaenati Eparchy	Kutaisi and Tskaltubo	Metropolitan Kalistrate (Margalitashvili)	Kutaisi, Gelati Monastery
36	Shemokmedi Eparchy	Ozurgeti, Lanchkhuti and Chokhatauri	Archbishop Joseph (Kikvadze)	Shemokmedi Monastery, Ozurgeti, Lanchkhuti, Chokhatauri
37	Tsageri and Lentekhi Eparchy	Tsageri and Lentekhi	Bishop Stephan (Kalaijishvili)	Tsageri, Lentekhi
38	Bichvinta and Tskhum-Abkhazeti Eparchy	Abkhazia	Shio III	Sukhumi, New Athos Monastery, Pitsunda Cathedral, Gudauta, Gagra
39	Tsilkani and Dusheti Eparchy	Dusheti	Archbishop Zosime (Shioshvili)	Tsilkani, Dusheti
40	Chiatura and Sachkhere Eparchy	Chiatura and Sachkhere	(Acting) Metropolitan Daniel (Datuashvili)	Chiatura, Sachkhere
41	Chkondidi Eparchy	Abasha and Martvili	Metropolitan George (Shalamberidze)	Martvili Monastery, Abasha, Chkhorotsku
42	Khoni and Samtredia Eparchy	Samtredia and Khoni	Metropolitan Saba (Gigiberia)	Khoni Cathedral, Samtredia
43	Khornabuji Eparchy	Dedoplistskaro		

== Elsewhere ==
#	Eparchy	Territory	Current head	Cathedral/Residence
44	Georgian Orthodox Eparchy of Australia	Australia		
45	Georgian Orthodox Eparchy of Belgium and Netherlands	Belgium and Netherlands	Archimandrite Dosite (Bogveradze)	
46	Georgian Orthodox Eparchy of Germany and Austria	Germany and Austria	Archimandrite Lazare (Samadbegishvili)	
47	Georgian Orthodox Eparchy of Great Britain and Ireland	Great Britain and Ireland	Archbishop Zenon (Iarajuli)	Cathedral of the Nativity of Our Lord, London
48	Georgian Orthodox Eparchy of North America and Canada	North America	Bishop Saba (Intskirveli)	Ashley, Pennsylvania
49	Georgian Orthodox Eparchy of South America	South America		
50	Georgian Orthodox Eparchy of Western Europe	Western Europe	Metropolitan Abraham (Garmelia)	Paris, France (until 2014 Regensburg, Germany)

== See also ==
- Eparchies and metropolitanates of the Russian Orthodox Church
- Eparchies and metropolitanates of the Serbian Orthodox Church
- Eparchies and metropolitanates of the Romanian Orthodox Church
