= Tao-Klarjeti (historical region) =

- Historical region
- Map of modern Tao-Klarjeti, region Georgia lost in 1921
- Area: Caucasus
- Region: Western Asia

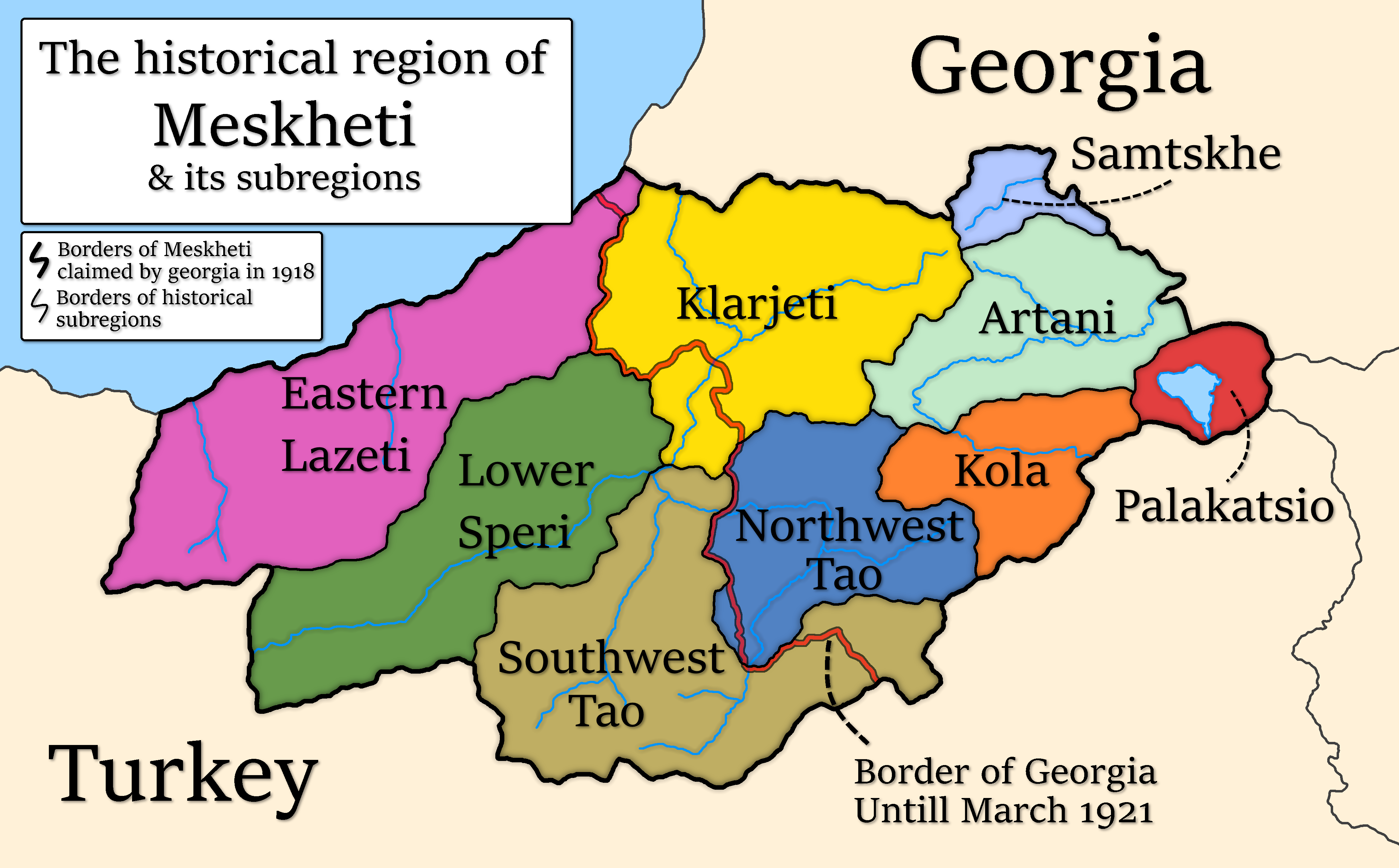
Map of Tao-Klarjeti with historical subregions

Tao-Klarjeti (Georgian: ტაო-კლარჯეთი, romanized: t'ao-k'larjeti [tʼäo̞kʼɫäɾd͡ʒe̞t̪ʰi]) is a Georgian historical and cultural region in north-eastern Turkey. The region is based around two river basins - Chorokhi and Kura (Mtkvari), and also partially includes the upper source of the Aras river. In modern usage it most often denotes the territory that was administered or claimed by Georgian Democratic Republic but is nowadays part of Turkey due to the Soviet-Turkish deal in 1921.

The term "Tao-Klarjeti" is based on the names of two most important provinces of the region — Tao and Klarjeti. The term is equivalent to “Zemo Kartli” (i.e., Upper Kartli or Upper Iberia) and is also a synonym for historical Meskheti.

== Cultural and historical heritage ==
Historical Tao-Klarjeti in the 8th-10th centuries

Many important Georgian cultural monuments from the middle ages are located on the territory of Tao-Klarjeti and many of them are preserved as ruins. Several monuments of medieval Georgian architecture – abandoned or converted churches, monasteries, bridges and castles – are scattered across the area.

Best known are the monasteries of Khandzta, Khakhuli, Ancha, the churches of Oshki, Ishkhani, Bana, Parkhali, Doliskana, Otkhta Eklesia, Opiza, Shatberdi, Rabati("New Rabati"-"Yeni Rabati"), Parekhi and Tbeti.

== Gallery ==
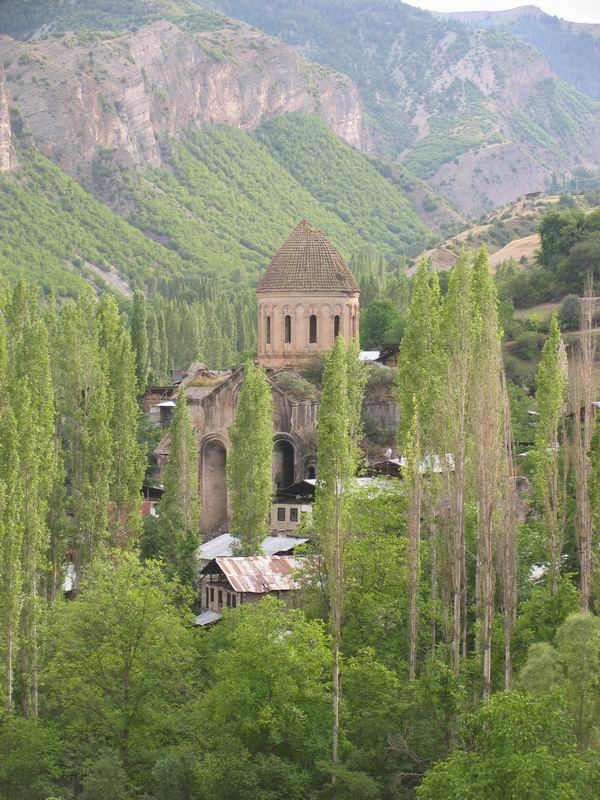
Oshki Cathedral

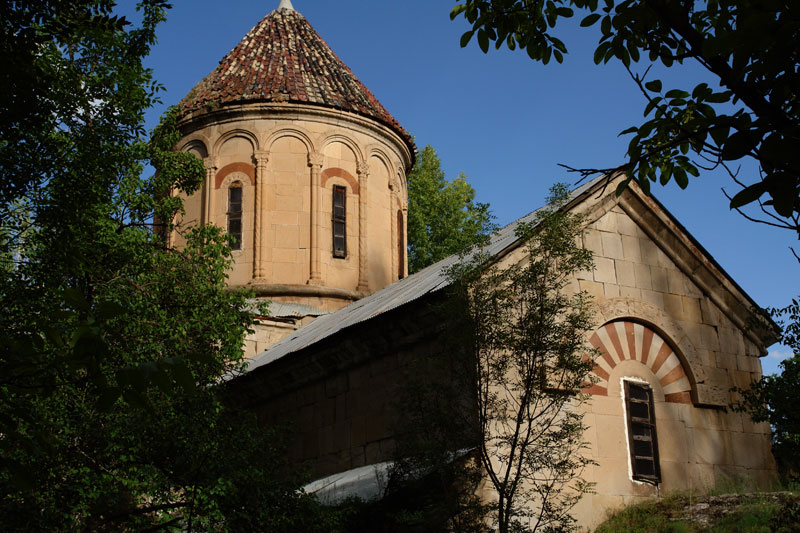
Khakhuli Church

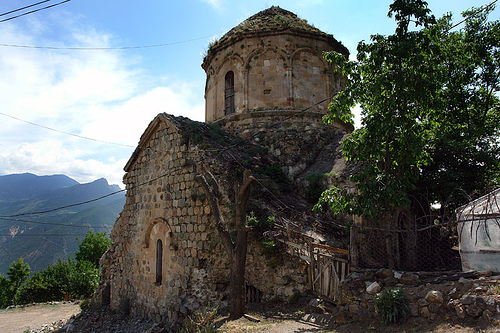
Dolisqana Church

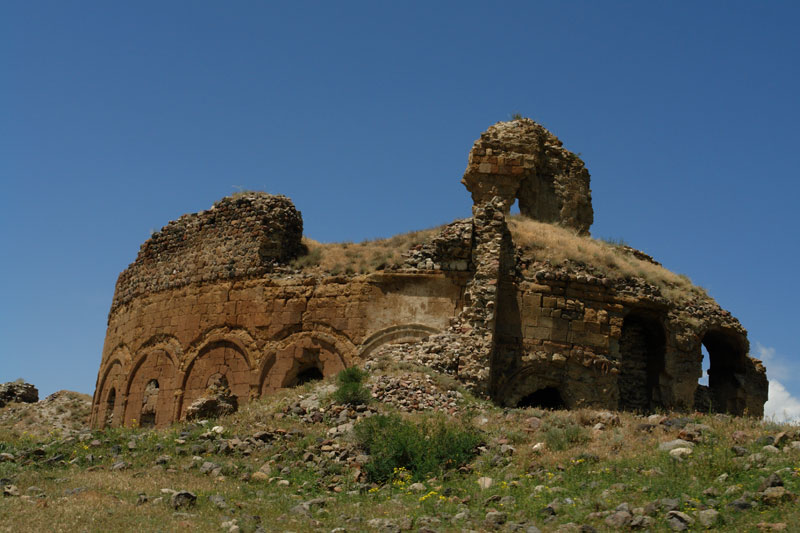
Bana Cathedral

Tbeti Cathedral

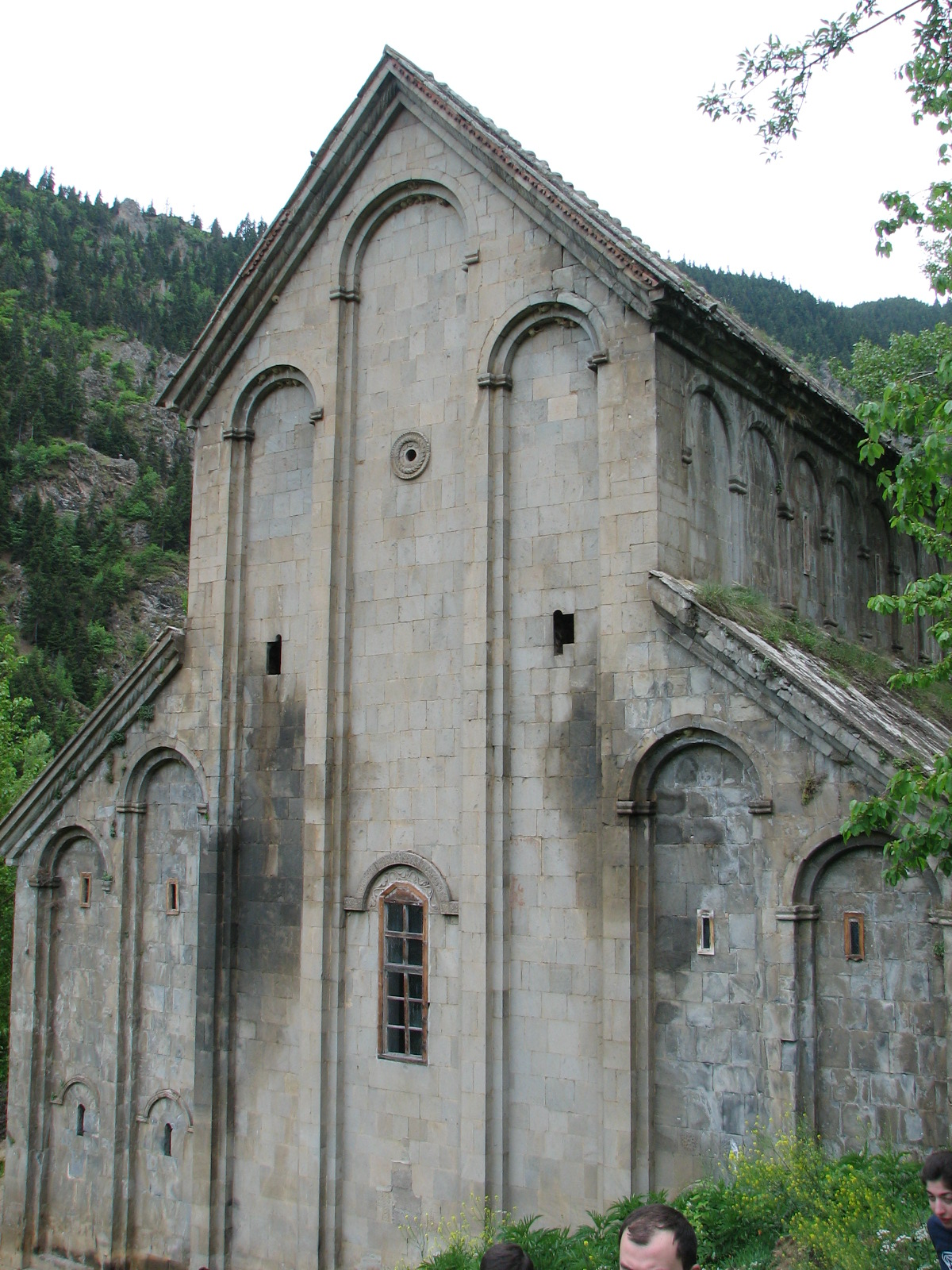
Parkhali Church

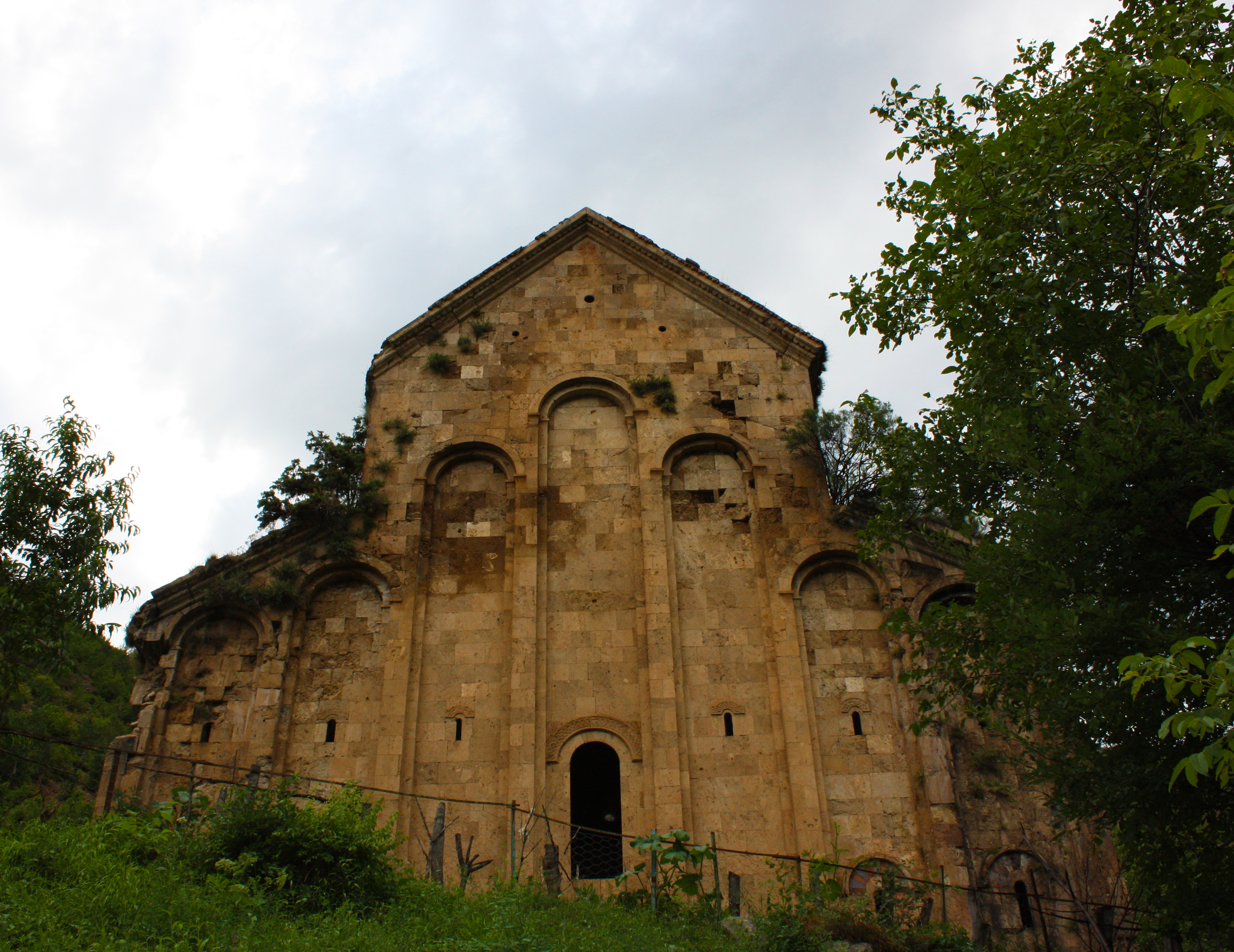
Otkhta Eklesia

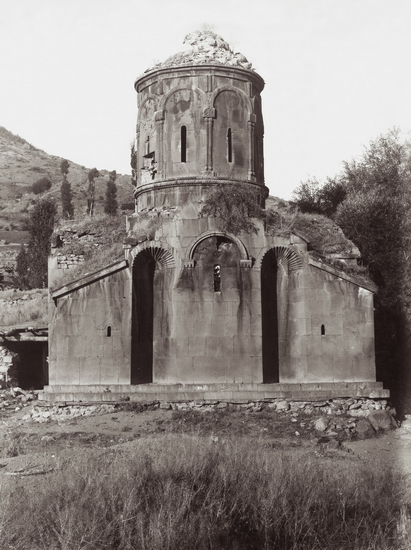
Ekeki church

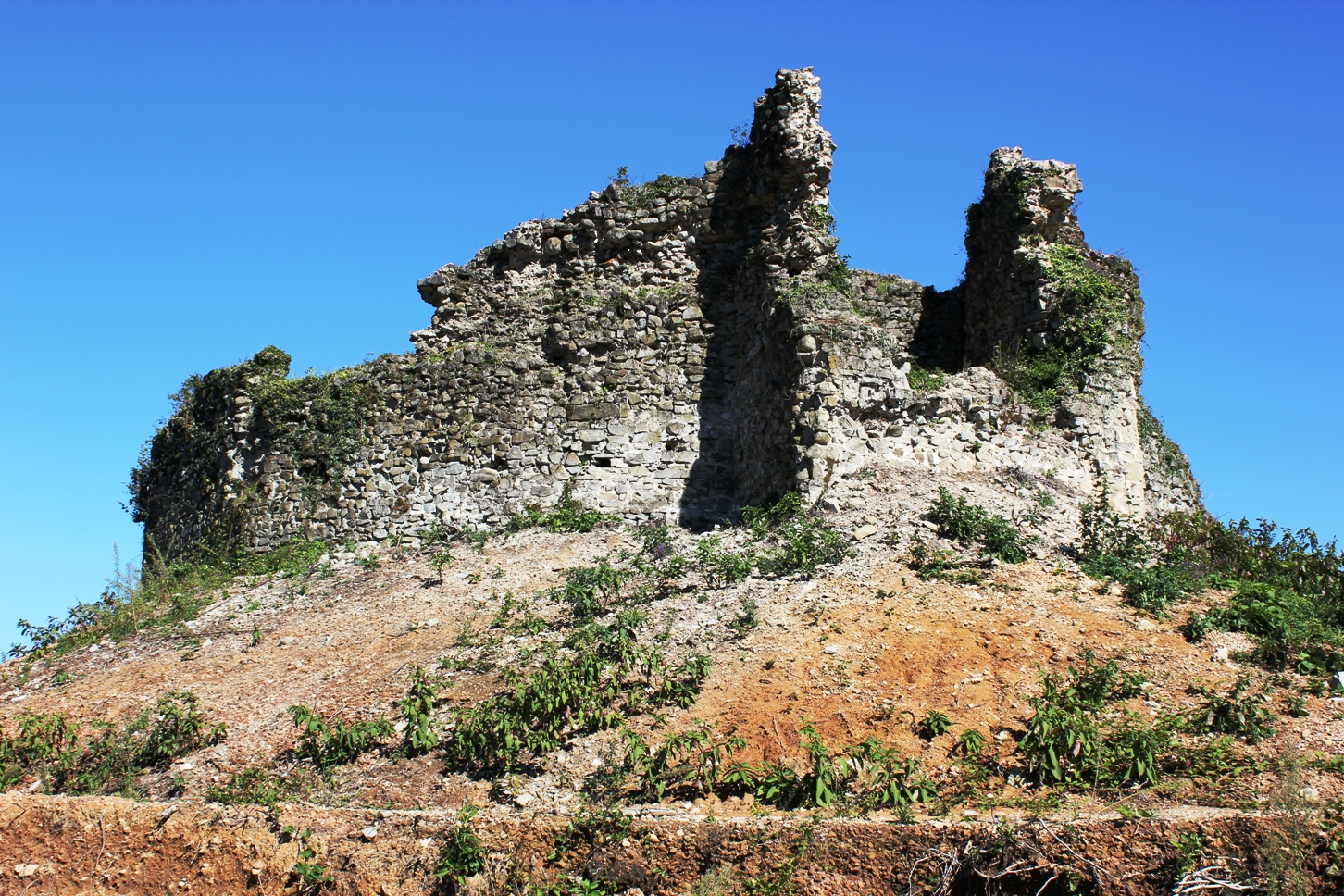
Ghulivati Castle

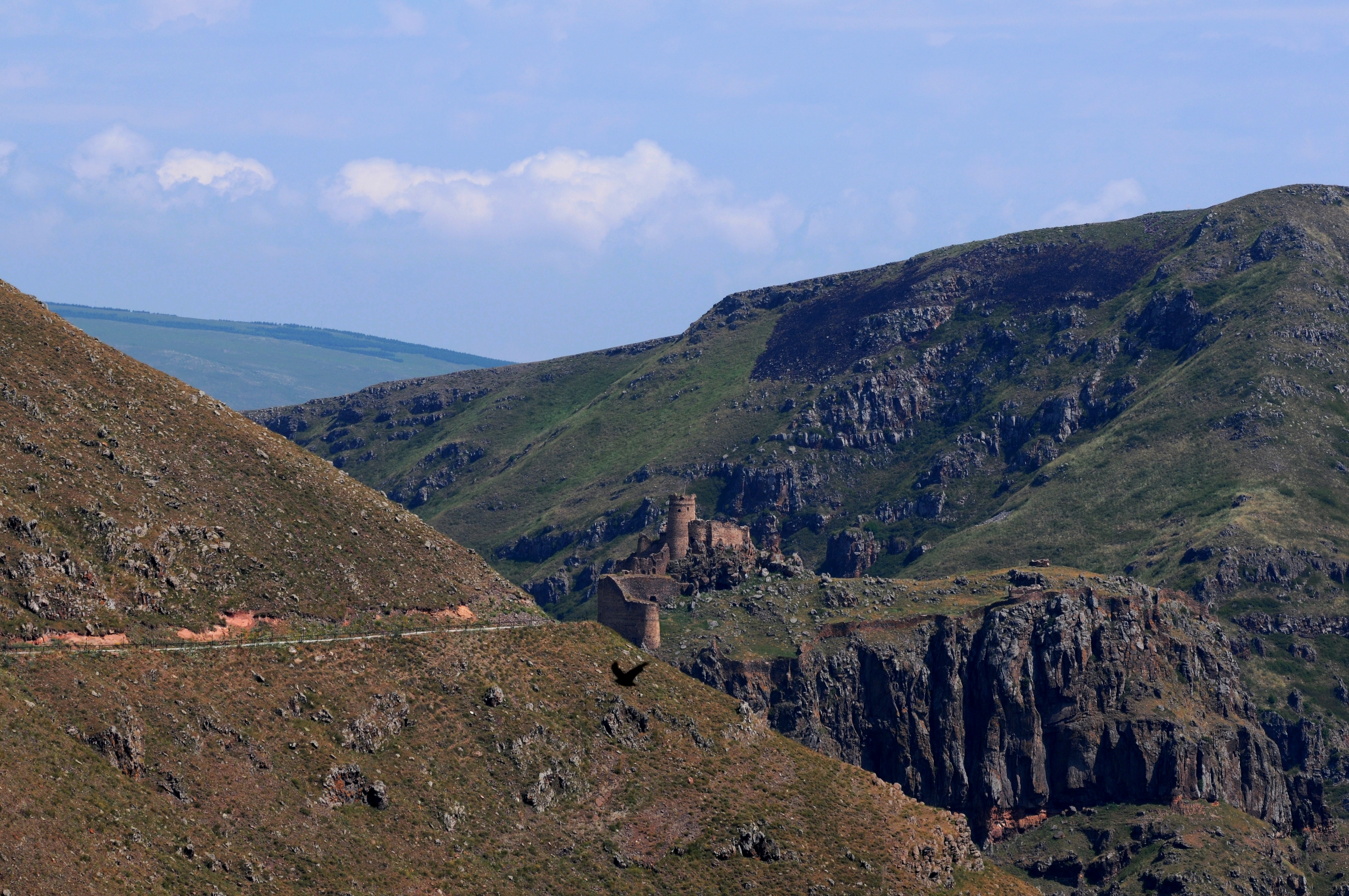
Kajeti Castle

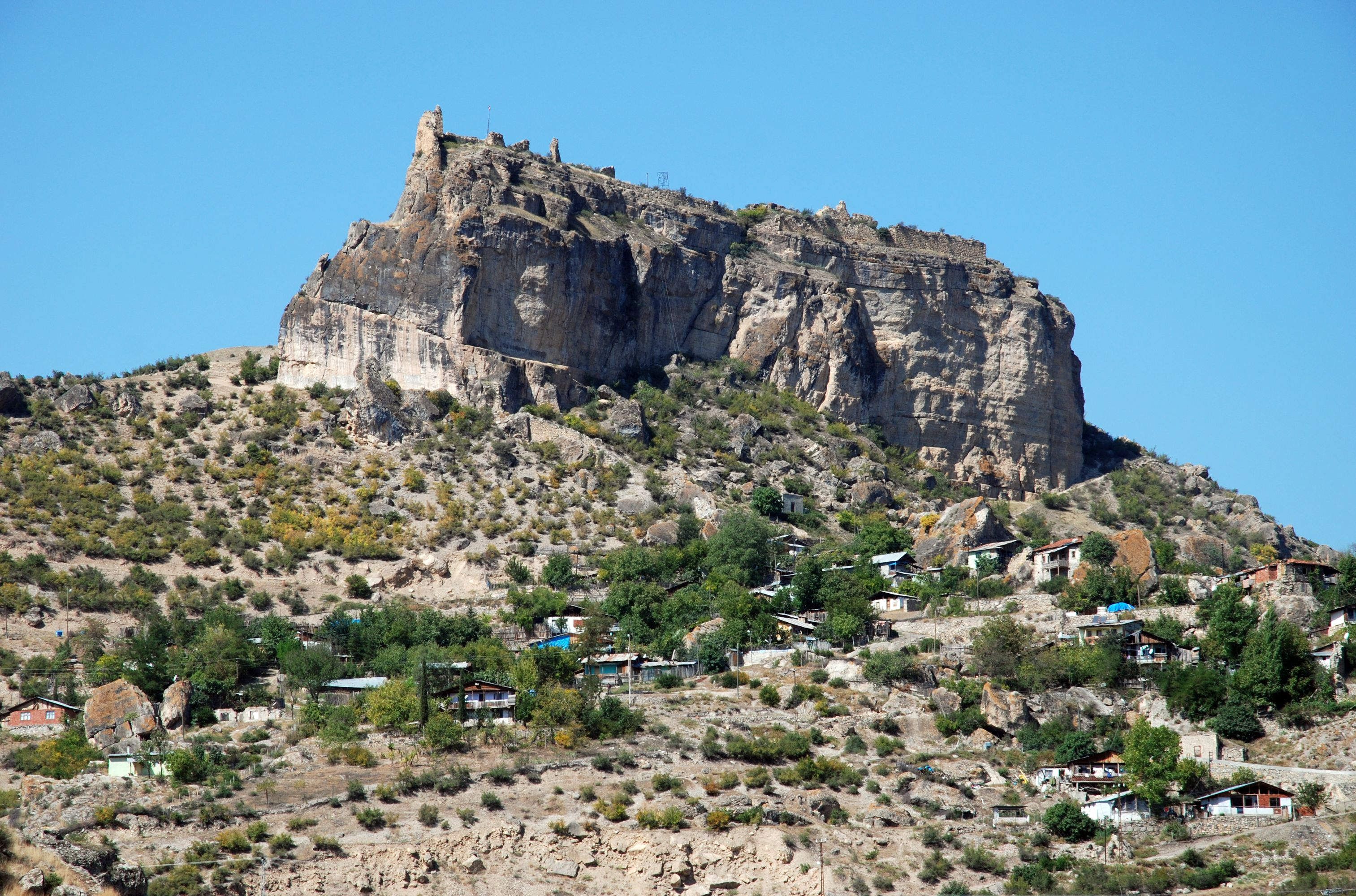
Artanuji Castle

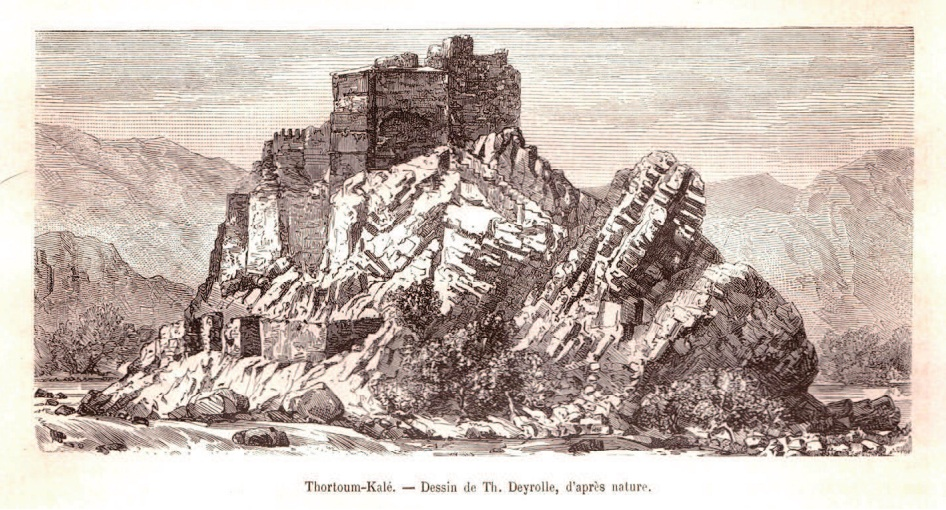
Tortomi Castle
