= Eparchy of Akhaltsikhe and Tao-Klarjeti =

Georgian Orthodox Church diocese

- Coat of Arms of Georgian Apostolic Autocephalous Orthodox Church

Location
- Territory: South-western parts of Georgia and Tao-Klarjeti
- Headquarters: Akhaltsikhe, Georgia

Information
- Denomination: Eastern Orthodox
- Sui iuris church: Georgian Orthodox Church
- Established: 1981
- Language: Georgian

Current leadership
- Bishop: Theodore Chuadze

Map

The Eparchy of Akhaltsikhe and Tao-Klarjeti (Georgian: ახალციხისა და ტაო-კლარჯეთის ეპარქია) is an eparchy (diocese) of the Georgian Orthodox Church with its seat in Akhaltsikhe, Georgia. It has jurisdiction over Akhaltsikhe, Adigeni, Aspindza municipalities in Georgia and historical region of Tao-Klarjeti, currently part of Turkey.

== Heads ==
Picture	Name	Time
Georgian Orthodox Eparchy of Akhaltsikhe and Tao-Klarjeti
	Ananias	June 29, 1981 — December 25, 1992
	Sergi Chekurishvili	December 27, 1992 — October 1997
	Nikoloz Pachuashvili	October 1997 — October 8, 1998
	Theodore Chuadze	since November 1998

== See also ==
- Georgian Orthodox Church in Turkey
