= Eastern Orthodoxy in Turkey =

Overview of Eastern Orthodoxy in the Republic of Turkey

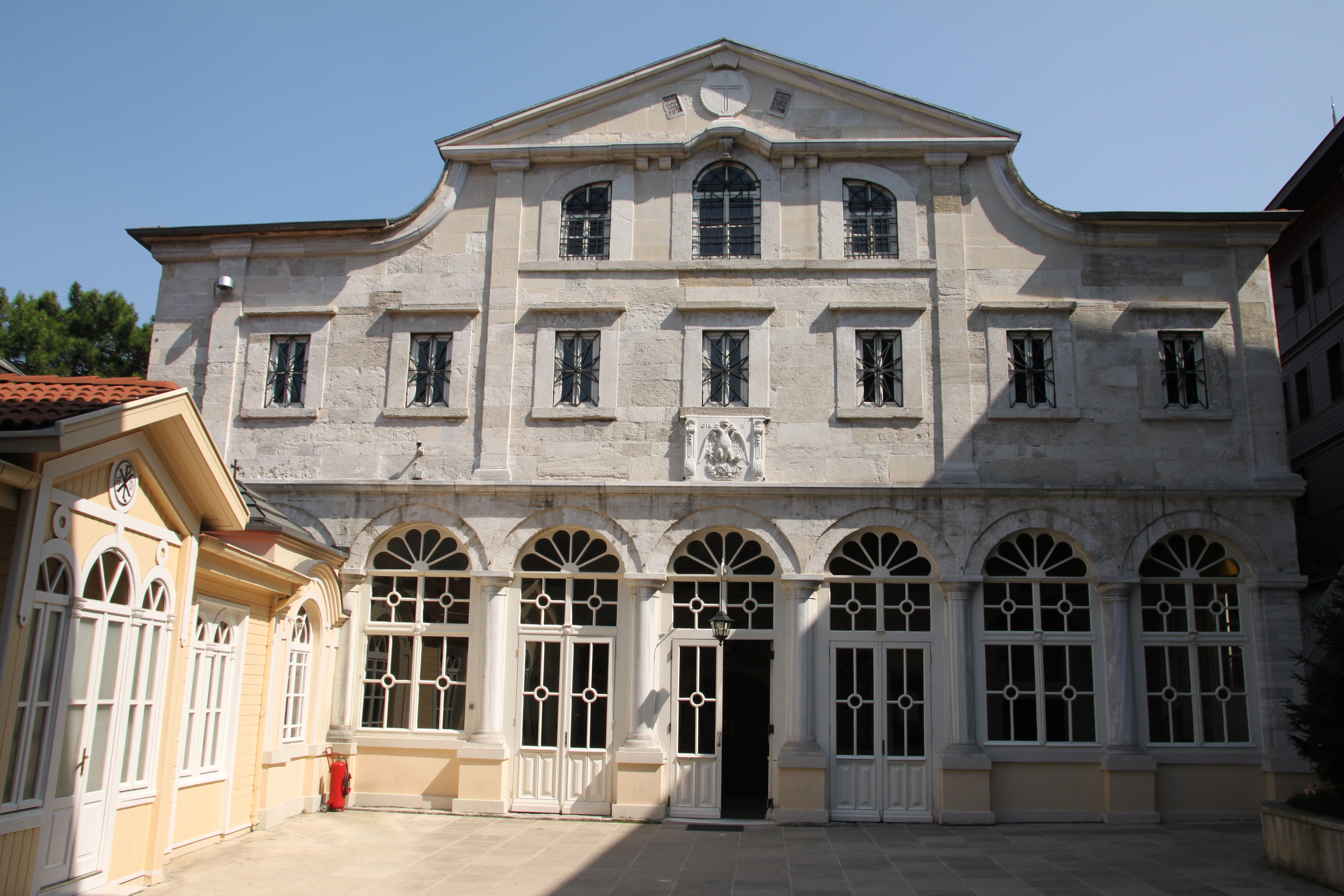
Hagios Georgios cathedral in Istanbul, at the Ecumenical Patriarchate

Eastern Orthodoxy in Turkey refers to adherents, communities and institutions of Eastern Orthodox Christianity in Turkey. Within the ecclesiastical order of the Eastern Orthodox Church, territory of modern Turkey is traditionally divided between three patrimonial jurisdictions: western and central parts belong to the Ecumenical Patriarchate of Constantinople, southeastern regions belong to the Eastern Orthodox Patriarchate of Antioch, while some northwestern parts belong to the Georgian Orthodox Church. In historical terms, Eastern Orthodoxy was once the dominant religion in those territories, particularly during the time of the Byzantine Empire, as the region that comprises Turkey today was a central part of the Byzantine heritage. Today, less than one tenth of one percent of the population of Turkey are Eastern Orthodox Christians. The provinces of Istanbul and Hatay, which includes Antakya, are the main centers of Christianity in Turkey, with comparatively dense Christian populations, though they are minorities in these areas.

== History ==
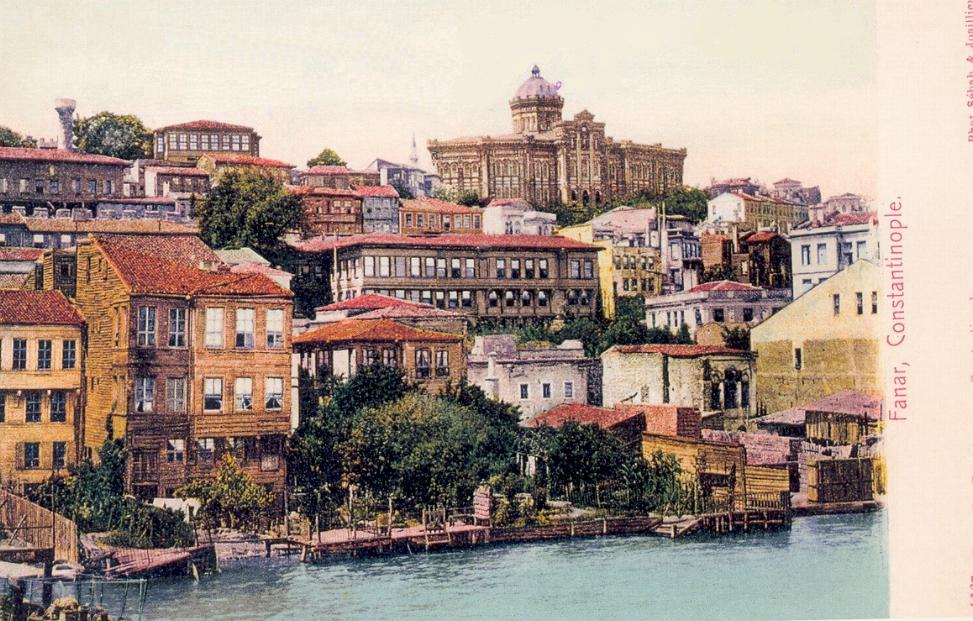
View of the Phanarion quarter, the historical centre of the Greek community of Constantinople in Ottoman times, ca. 1900.

The Ecumenical Patriarch was recognized as the highest religious and political leader (millet-bashi, or ethnarch) of all Orthodox Christian subjects of the Sultan, though in certain periods some major powers, such as Russia (under the Treaty of Küçük Kaynarca of 1774), or Great Britain claimed the rights of protection over the Ottoman Empire's Orthodox subjects.

For those that remained under the Ottoman Empire's millet system, religion was the defining characteristic of national groups (milletler), so the exonym "Greeks" (Rumlar from the name Rhomaioi) was applied by the Ottomans to all members of the Orthodox Church, regardless of their language or ethnic origin. The Greeks and Antiochian Rum were the only groups to actually call themselves Romans (Gr: Romioi, Ar: Rum, Tr: Rumlar), (as opposed to being so named by others) and Greeks, at least those educated, considered their ethnicity (genos) to be Hellenic. There were, however, many Greeks who escaped the second-class status of Christians inherent in the Ottoman millet system, according to which Muslims were explicitly awarded senior status and preferential treatment. These Greeks either emigrated, particularly to their fellow Orthodox Christian protector, the Russian Empire, or simply converted to Islam, often only very superficially and whilst remaining crypto-Christian. The most notable examples of large-scale conversion to Turkish Islam among those today defined as Greek Muslims—excluding those who had to convert as a matter of course on being recruited through the devshirme—were to be found in Crete (Cretan Turks), Greek Macedonia (for example among the Vallahades of western Macedonia), and among Pontic Greeks in the Pontic Alps and Armenian Highlands. Several Ottoman sultans and princes were also of part Greek origin, with mothers who were either Greek concubines or princesses from Byzantine noble families, one famous example being sultan Selim the Grim (r. 1517–1520), whose mother Gülbahar Hatun was a Pontic Greek.

The roots of Greek success in the Ottoman Empire can be traced to the Greek tradition of education and commerce exemplified in the Phanariotes. They emerged as a class of wealthy Greek Orthodox merchants (of mostly noble Byzantine descent) during the second half of the 16th century, and were influential in the administration of the Ottoman Empire's Balkan domains in the 18th century. It was the wealth of the extensive merchant class that provided the material basis for the intellectual revival that was the prominent feature of Greek life in the half century and more leading to the outbreak of the Greek War of Independence in 1821. Not coincidentally, on the eve of 1821, the three most important centres of Greek learning were situated in Chios, Smyrna and Aivali, all three major centres of Greek commerce. Greek success was also favoured by Greek domination in the leadership of the Eastern Orthodox church.

=== Modern history ===
Eparchies of Eastern Orthodox patriarchates of Constantinople and Antioch in Asia Minor c. 1880.

Before World War I, there were an estimated 1.8 million Orthodox Greeks living in the Ottoman Empire. Some prominent Ottoman Greeks served as Ottoman Parliamentary Deputies. In the 1908 Parliament, there were twenty-six (26) Ottoman Greek deputies but their number dropped to eighteen (18) by 1914. It is estimated that the Greek population of the Ottoman Empire in Asia Minor had 2,300 community schools, 200,000 students, 5,000 teachers, 2,000 Greek Orthodox churches, and 3,000 Greek Orthodox priests. Into the 19th century, the Christians of Istanbul tended to be either Greek Orthodox, members of the Armenian Apostolic Church or Catholic Levantines. Greeks and Armenians form the largest Christian population in the city. While Istanbul's Greek population was exempted from the 1923 population exchange with Greece, changes in tax status and the 1955 anti-Greek pogrom prompted thousands to leave.

The Orthodox population of Turkey was substantially reduced as a result of World War I. Additionally, the vast majority of Greek Orthodox Christians were forced to leave the territory of Turkey in a population swap following the Treaty of Lausanne. Included among that transfer were many Turkish speaking Christians, who were nonetheless sent to Greece. Although the Greek Orthodox populations of Istanbul and some Turkish Aegean Islands were officially protected under the treaty, discrimination and harsh treatment, culminating in the Istanbul Pogrom led to further emigration. Many Greek Orthodox people living in Istanbul and the Islands were at various times arbitrarily stripped of their Turkish citizenship. Finally, a 1971 law significantly limiting the operation of private universities led to the closure of the Halki Seminary, the main theological school of the Orthodox community. Despite a 40-year campaign to reopen the school and periodic discussion of the matter by Turkish politicians, it remains closed.

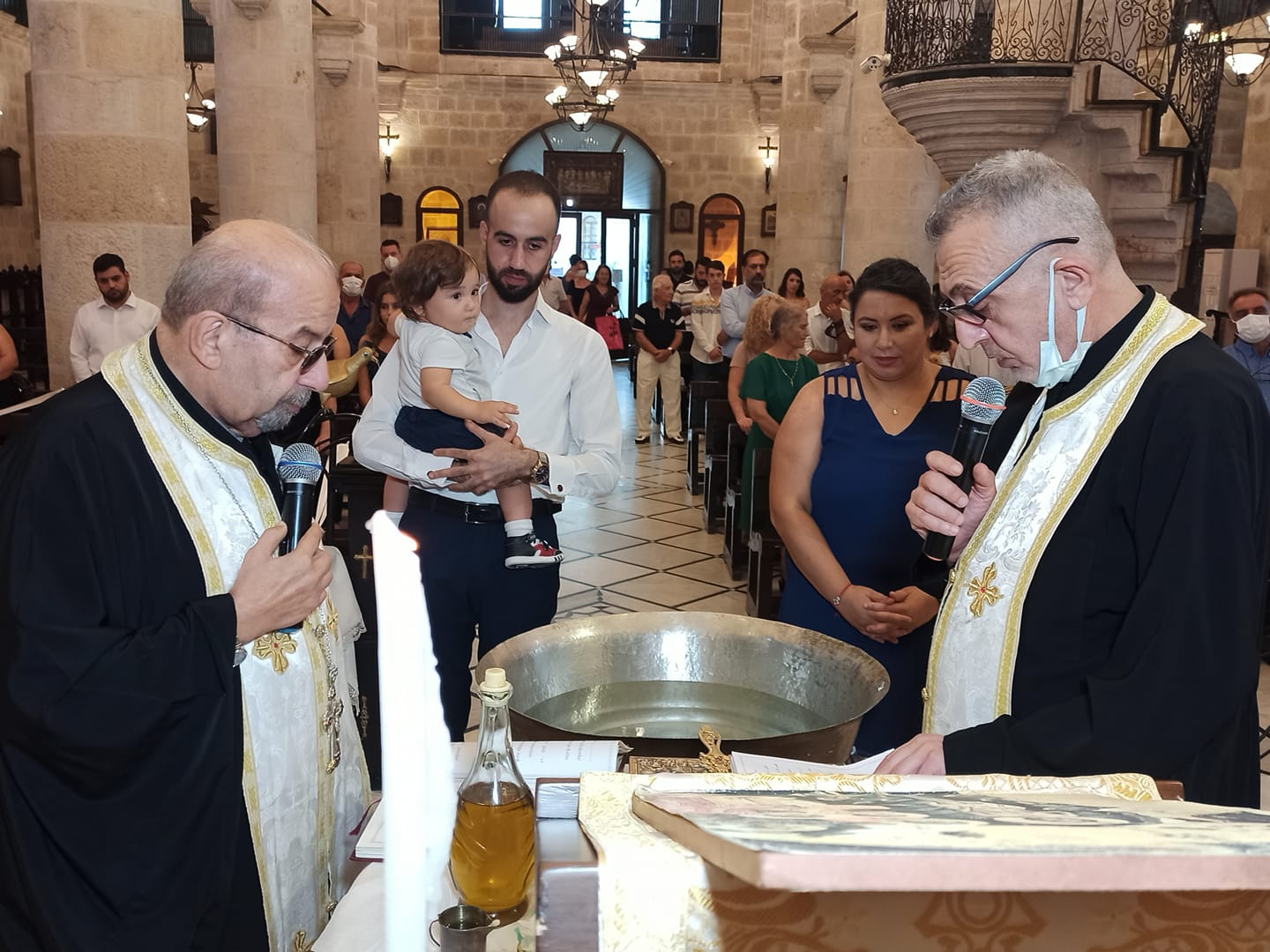
Antiochian Greek Christians from Antakya.

Indeed, İzmir (formerly Grecian Smyrna) used to have a Greek Orthodox majority until the 20th century, but the Christian population in the area today consists of few people. Despite this decline, however, the Ecumenical Patriarch of Constantinople, the Greek Orthodox leader of the Eastern Orthodox Church has his seat in Istanbul, and an Autocephalous Turkish Orthodox Patriarchate exists in Istanbul as well, though the latter is not recognized by other Orthodox communities worldwide and has only a handful number of adherents. Furthermore, the Greek Orthodox Patriarch of Antioch is based in Damascus, Syria. This is probably due to the history Christianity has in the region, as Constantinople used to be the religious centre of Eastern Orthodox during the Middle Ages, and the famous Apostle Paul of Tarsus was from Turkey and performed his first of three missions trips recorded in Acts exclusively in that area.

While the Greek Orthodox community of Istanbul numbered 67,550 persons in 1955. However, after the Istanbul Pogrom orchestrated by Turkish authorities against the Greek community in that year, their number was dramatically reduced to only 48,000. Today, the Greek community numbers about 2,000 people.

== Patriarchate of Constantinople ==
After the Fall of Constantinople to the Ottoman Turks in 1453, the Orthodox Christians of the Empire were divided into multiple teva'if (meaning "groups" in Ottoman Turkish). The head of each local ta'ife was the local Bishop. This was likely due to both the fact that the Ottomans were unfamiliar with Orthodox ecclesiology and that they intended to keep Orthodox subjects divided. The Orthodox only started being viewed as a single ta'ife during the late sixteenth century. The term millet started being used for the Orthodox population by the time of the rise of the Millet System during the Tanzimat reforms. By the late 18th century onward, the Patriarch of Constantinople had effectively become the "Ethnarch" of the Greek nation as well as the representative and head of all Orthodox in the Empire, who by then had been organised into the Rum Millet, due to the Patriarchate's de facto influence over the Patriarchates of Alexandria, Antioch and Jerusalem as well as its de jure jurisdiction over the entirety of the Balkans due to the abolition of the Autocephalous Archbishoprics of Achris/Ohrid and Ipekion/Pec.

The position of the Patriarchate in the Ottoman state encouraged projects of Greek renaissance, centered on the resurrection and revitalization of the Byzantine Empire. The Patriarch and those church dignitaries around him constituted the first centre of power for the Greeks inside the Ottoman state, one which succeeded in infiltrating the structures of the Ottoman Empire, while attracting the former Byzantine nobility.

== Patriarchate of Antioch ==
Southeastern parts of modern Turkey traditionally belong to the ecclesiastical jurisdiction of the Eastern Orthodox Patriarchate of Antioch, whose ancient seat was in Antioch on the Orontes (modern Antakya in Turkey). A significant number of Antiochian Greek Christians who are adherents of the Patriarchate of Antioch in Turkey live in the Hatay province, and also in Istanbul. They have their cathedral in Antioch, but are also present in İskenderun, Samandağ, and Altınözü. In 1995, their total population was estimated at 10,000. On 13 October 2025, the Archdiocese of Tarsus, Adana, and Alexandretta was re-established by the Holy Synod of the Patriarchate of Antioch.

== Patriarchate of Moscow ==
Following the 2018 Moscow–Constantinople schism, Moscow sent priest George Sergeev to Turkey for pastoral care of Russian-speaking Orthodox community and Turkish inquirers in Turkey. In 2024, ROC launched a internet site named mospaturk.ru for the mission in Turkey. As of 2026, there is 4 priests and monthly/weekly services held in nearly 10 districts, mostly in the cities bordering the Aegean and Mediterranean.

== See also ==
- Christianity in Turkey
- Ecumenical Patriarchate of Constantinople
- Georgian Orthodox Church in Turkey
- Protestantism in Turkey
- Religious minorities in Turkey
- Catholicism in Turkey

== Sources ==
- Alaux, Louis-Paul; Puaux, René (1916). Le Déclin de l'Hellénisme. Paris, France: Librairie Payot & Cie.
- Boardman, John (1984). "13. The Greek World". In Boardman, John (ed.). The Cambridge Ancient History: Plates to Volume III, the Middle East, the Greek World and the Balkans to the Sixth Century B.C. Cambridge: Cambridge University Press. pp. 199–289. ISBN 978-0-521-24289-9.
- Çelik, Zeynep (1993). The Remaking of Istanbul: Portrait of an Ottoman City in the Nineteenth Century. Berkeley and Los Angeles: University of California Press. ISBN 978-0-520-08239-7.
- Kiminas, Demetrius (2009). The Ecumenical Patriarchate: A History of Its Metropolitanates with Annotated Hierarch Catalogs. Wildside Press LLC. ISBN 9781434458766.
- Lekka, Anastasia (2007). "Legislative Provisions of the Ottoman/Turkish Governments Regarding Minorities and Their Properties". Mediterranean Quarterly. 18 (1): 135–154. doi:10.1215/10474552-2006-038.
- Mazower, Mark (2000). The Balkans: A Short History. New York: Modern Library. ISBN 978-0-8129-6621-3.
- Meyendorff, John (1989). Imperial unity and Christian divisions: The Church 450-680 A.D. Crestwood, NY: St. Vladimir's Seminary Press. ISBN 978-0-88141-056-3.
- Roudometof, Victor; Robertson, Roland (2001). Nationalism, Globalization, and Orthodoxy: The Social Origins of Ethnic Conflict in the Balkans. Westport, Connecticut: Greenwood Publishing Group.
- Institute for Neohellenic Research (2005). The Historical Review. Vol. II. Athens, Greece: Institute for Neohellenic Research.
