= Eparchy of Batumi and Lazeti =

Georgian Orthodox Church diocese

- Coat of Arms of Georgian Apostolic Autocephalous Orthodox Church

Location
- Territory: South-western parts of Georgia and Lazeti
- Headquarters: Batumi, Georgia

Information
- Denomination: Eastern Orthodox
- Sui iuris church: Georgian Orthodox Church
- Established: 1917
- Language: Georgian

Current leadership
- Bishop: Dimitry Shiolashvili

Map

The Eparchy of Batumi and Lazeti (Georgian: ბათუმისა და ლაზეთის ეპარქია) is an eparchy (diocese) of the Georgian Orthodox Church with its seat in Batumi, Georgia. It has jurisdiction over Municipalities of Kobuleti, Khelvachauri, city of Batumi in Georgia and historical region of Lazeti (Lazistan), currently part of Turkey.

== Heads ==
Picture	Name	Time
Georgian Orthodox Eparchy of Batimi and Lazeti
	Giorgi Aladashvili	1920 — 1922
	David Kachakhidze	1923 — 1924
	Nestor Kubaneishvili	18 May 1924 — 1926
	Ioanne Margvishviku	20 October 1926 — 3 March 1927
	David Kachakhidze	6 June 1930 — 19 March 1935
	Gabriel Chachanidze	1953
	Ephraim Sidamonidze	8 September 1953 — 10 January 1960
	Ilia Shiolashvili	26 August 1963 — 1 September 1967
	Roman Petriashvili	1974 — March 1979
	David Chkadua	15 October 1980 — 8 September 1981
	Shio Avalishvili	9 September 1981 — 24 June 1986
	Konstantin Melikidze	19 September 1984—1992
	Christopher Tsamalaidze	Spring — 21 December 1992
	Job Akiashvili	21 December 1992 — 21 October 1996
	Dimitry Shiolashvili	8 November 1996 — present

== See also ==
- Georgian Orthodox Church in Turkey
