= Eparchy of Akhalkalaki, Kumurdo and Kars =

Georgian Orthodox Church diocese

- Coat of Arms of Georgian Apostolic Autocephalous Orthodox Church

Location
- Territory: South-western parts of Georgia and Kari
- Headquarters: Akhalkalaki, Georgia

Information
- Denomination: Eastern Orthodox
- Sui iuris church: Georgian Orthodox Church
- Established: 1990
- Language: Georgian

Current leadership
- Bishop: Nikoloz Pachuashvili

Map

The Eparchy of Akhalkalaki, Kumurdo and Kars (Georgian: ახალქალაქის, კუმურდოსა და კარის ეპარქია) is an eparchy (diocese) of the Georgian Orthodox Church with its seat in Akhalkalaki, Georgia. It has jurisdiction over Akhalkalaki and Ninotsminda municipalities in Georgia and historical region of Kari, currently part of Turkey.

== Heads ==
Picture	Name	Time
Georgian Orthodox Eparchy of Akhalkalaki, Kumurdo and Kars
	Ambrosi	1980—1981
	Ananias	1981—1992
	Seraphim Jojua	1995—2002
	Nikoloz Pachuashvili	since 2002

== See also ==
- Georgian Orthodox Church in Turkey
