= Christopher Tsamalaidze =

Christopher (Georgian: ქრისტეფორე, secular name Yason Tsamalaidze, Georgian: ომარ იასონის ძე წამალაიძე; born 17 August 1943) is a former bishop of the Georgian Orthodox Church. In the early 1990s bishop Christopher (Tsamalaidze) had left his diocese without permission and for this cause repeatedly faced Church trials since 1995 to 2009 (suspended in 1995 and defrocked in 2003). In his turn, Christopher (Tsamalaidze) made political accusations against the Catholicos-Patriarch Ilia II. On 21 January 2006, bishop Christopher (Tsamalaidze) and archpriest Basil Kobakhidze participated in celebrations of the national Ukrainian holiday – the Day of Unity – and concelebrated with the primate of the Ukrainian Orthodox Church – Kyivan Patriarchate Filaret (Denisenko). One of former Tsamalaidze's clerics, archpriest Daniel (Kiknadze), has also gone into schism and now he is in communion with the primate of "The Orthodox Patriarchate of Nations" led by schismatic "Patriarch Nicholas Primo".
