= Monastery of Saint Barlaam =

Georgian monastery in Turkey

Monastery of Saint Barlaam ბარლაამწმინდა
- Location within Turkey

Religion
- Affiliation: Georgian Orthodox Church
- Status: Not functioning

Location
- Location: Yeditepe, Hatay Province, Turkey
- Interactive map of Monastery of Saint Barlaam ბარლაამწმინდა
- Coordinates: 35.947800°N 35.993300°E

Architecture
- Completed: 10th century

Monastery of Saint Barlaam (Georgian: ბარლაამწმინდა; Turkish: Barlaham Manastırı) is a 10th-century Georgian monastery in Antioch, modern-day Turkey's Hatay Province. During the Seleucid and the Roman era there existed a Doric temple. In the 4th century, St. Barlaam destroyed the statue of Zeus and formed a community of Christian monks. In the early 6th century on the ruins of the ancient temple was built a small church, however, it was soon destroyed as a result of an earthquake of 526 BC. It was rebuilt by Georgian monks between 950-1050 and functioned until 1268 when it was finally abandoned as a result of the massacres and the massive destruction brought by Muslim invaders.

== Sources ==
- Barlaham Manastırı (Yayladağı Belediyesi) Erişim tarihi: 8 Eylül 2011
- Hatay Manastırlar
