= Peroniti Church =

Orthodox church in Artvin Province, Turkey

Peroniti Church პირონითის ეკლესია
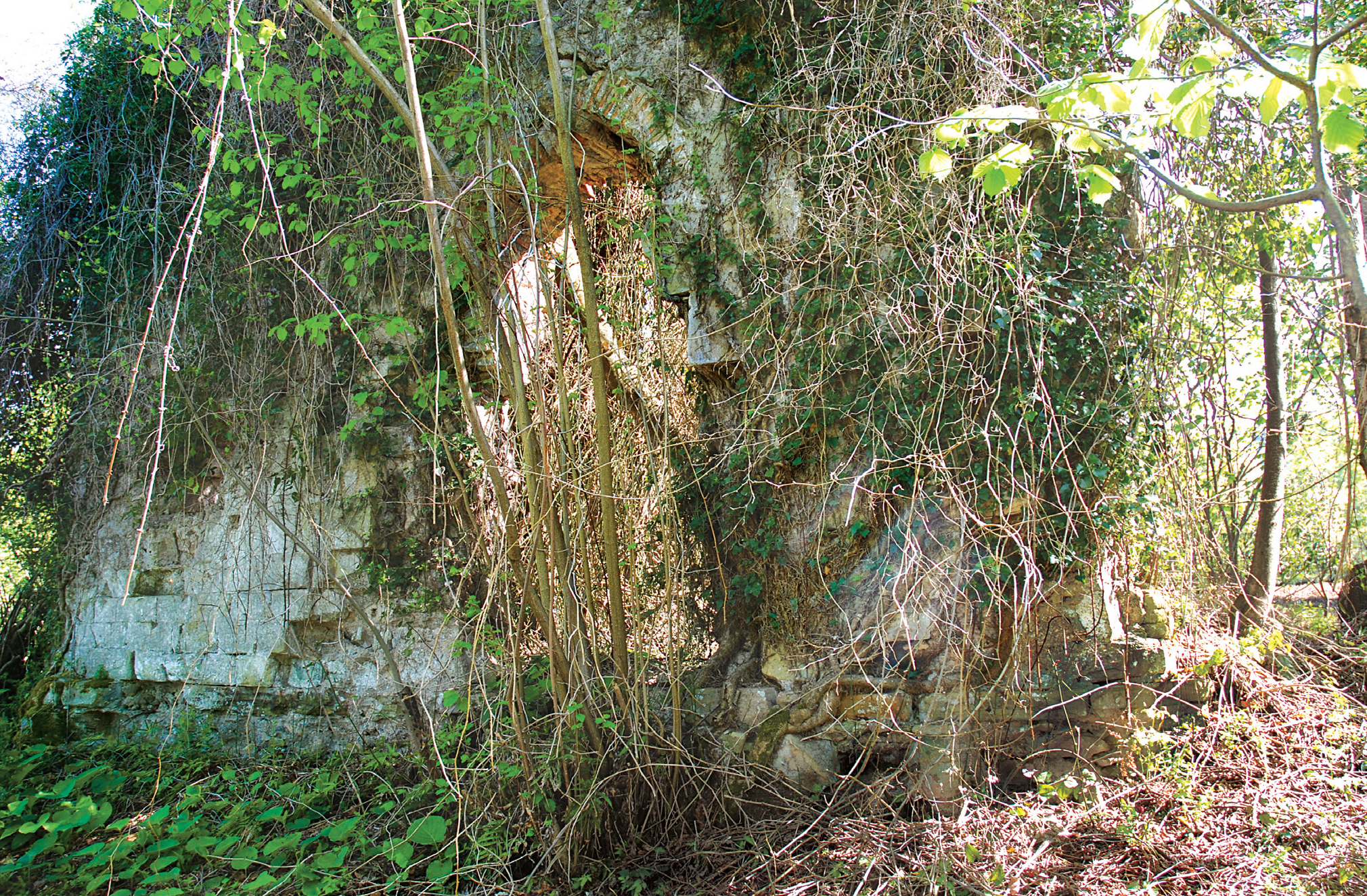

- Location within Turkey

Religion
- Affiliation: Eastern Orthodox
- Status: Not functioning

Location
- Location: Çamlı, Artvin Province, Turkey
- Interactive map of Peroniti Church პირონითის ეკლესია

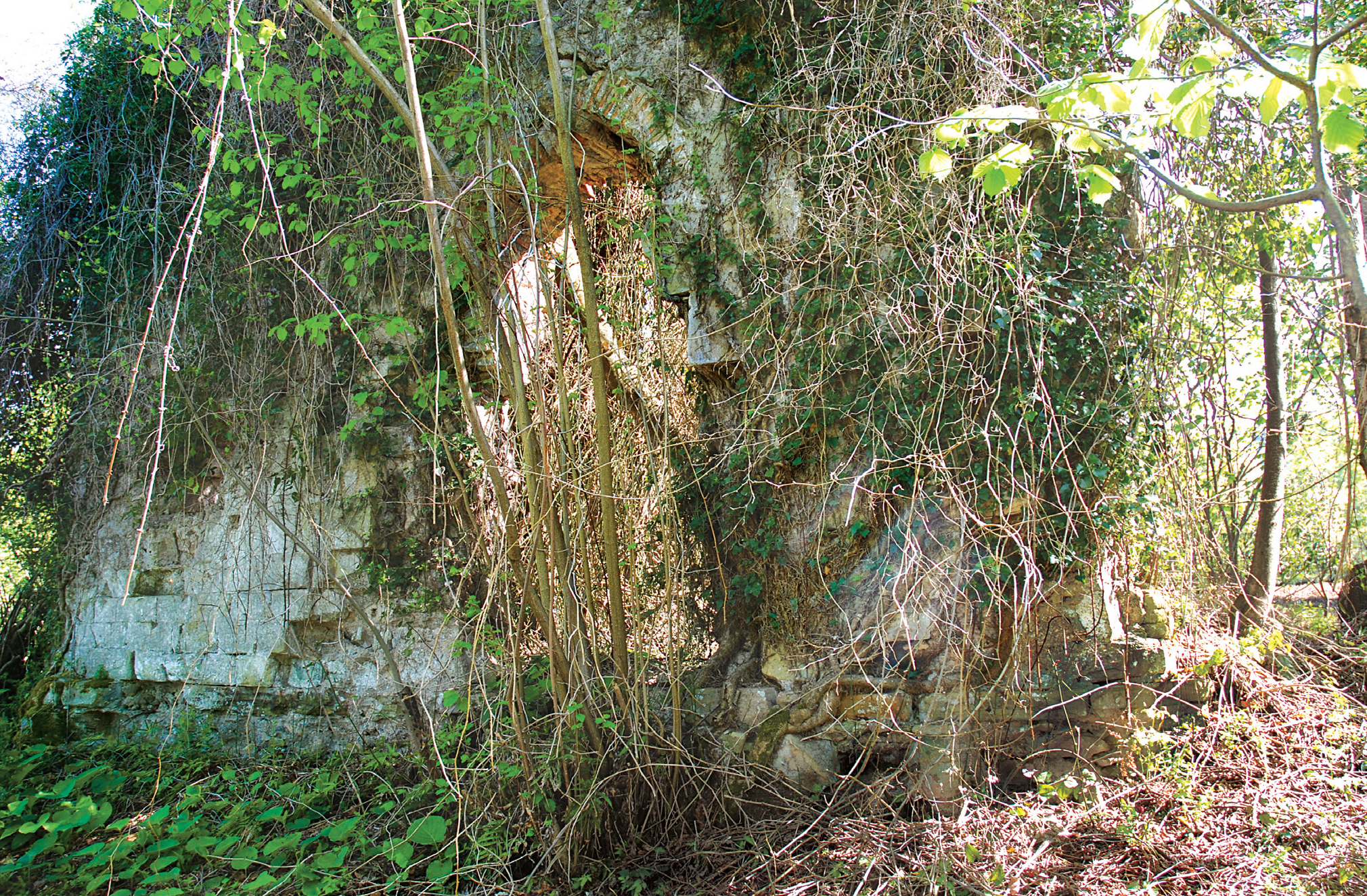
Bangleti Kilisesi.jpg

The Peroniti Church (Georgian: პირონითის ეკლესია) is an abandoned Orthodox Church located in the village of Peroniti (Çamlıköy) in Hopa, Artvin Province of Turkey, close to the border with Georgia. The church was constructed between sixth to seventh century and belonged to Exarchate of Lazica. This chapel is obviously distinguished by its architectural categories from the similar chapels in the eastern Black Sea littoral.
