= Manglisi Cathedral =

Orthodox cathedral near the town of Manglisi, Tetritsqaro Municipality, Georgia

Coordinates: 41°41′54″N 44°21′18″E

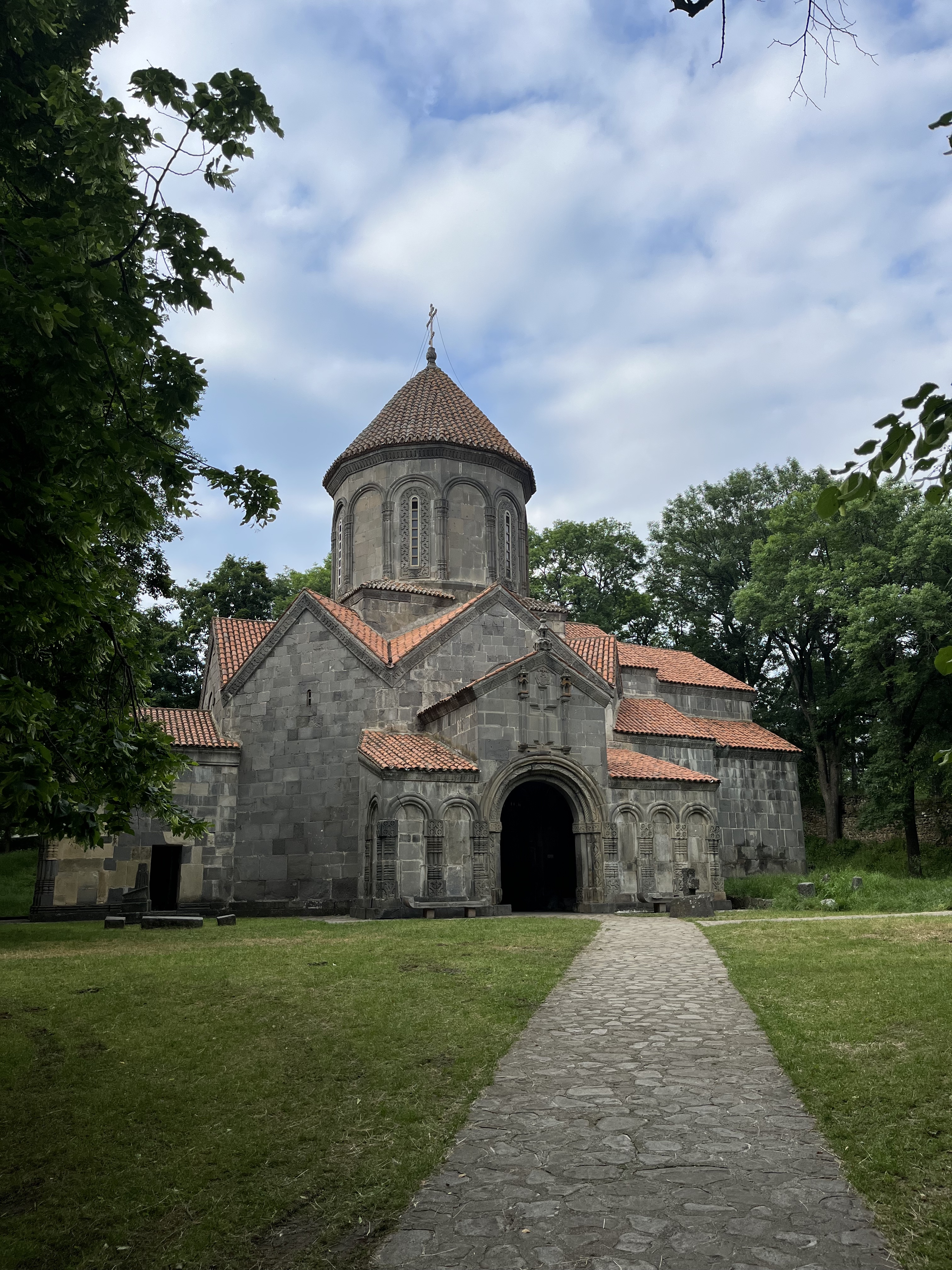
Manglisi Cathedral

Manglisi Cathedral or Manglisi Sioni Cathedral (Georgian: მანგლისის სიონი) is a 6th-7th-century Georgian Orthodox cathedral near the town of Manglisi, Tetritsqaro Municipality, Georgia.

The first church was built in 4th century. The current cathedral was constructed from the 6th to 7th centuries. The cathedral went through a huge restoration in 1002.

The temple has rather unique design. It is a tetraconch, rather common for the churches of the 6th-7th centuries, but unusually inserted into an octagon. Later alterations partly mask the original plan.

== History ==
According to The Georgian Chronicles, Byzantine Emperor Constantine gifted Georgian priests parts of the True Cross. Bishop Ioanne arrived to Manglisi, started construction of a church and left part of wood there. Thus, the first church in Manglisi may appear already in the 4th century, thus making it one of the first Christian churches in Georgia.

The second reference in the chronicles is connected with the time of Vakhtang Gorgasali, when the king sent a bishop to Manglisi (6th century).

In the reign of Stepanoz I (7th century), Greeks took the True Cross back to Constantinopolis.

Its final appearance the cathedral received during the reign of George II in the 11th century.

The walls around the church with towers were built by bishop Arseni in the 17th century. A writing above the gate, carved in the rock, mentions this.

The church documents mention 15 bishops, starting from the time of Tamar in the 12th-13th century, until the arrival of the Russians in the early 19th century.
