= Ananias (Jafaridze) =

Metropolitan of Manglisi and Tetri-Tskaro

Metropolitan Ananias მიტროპოლიტი ანანია
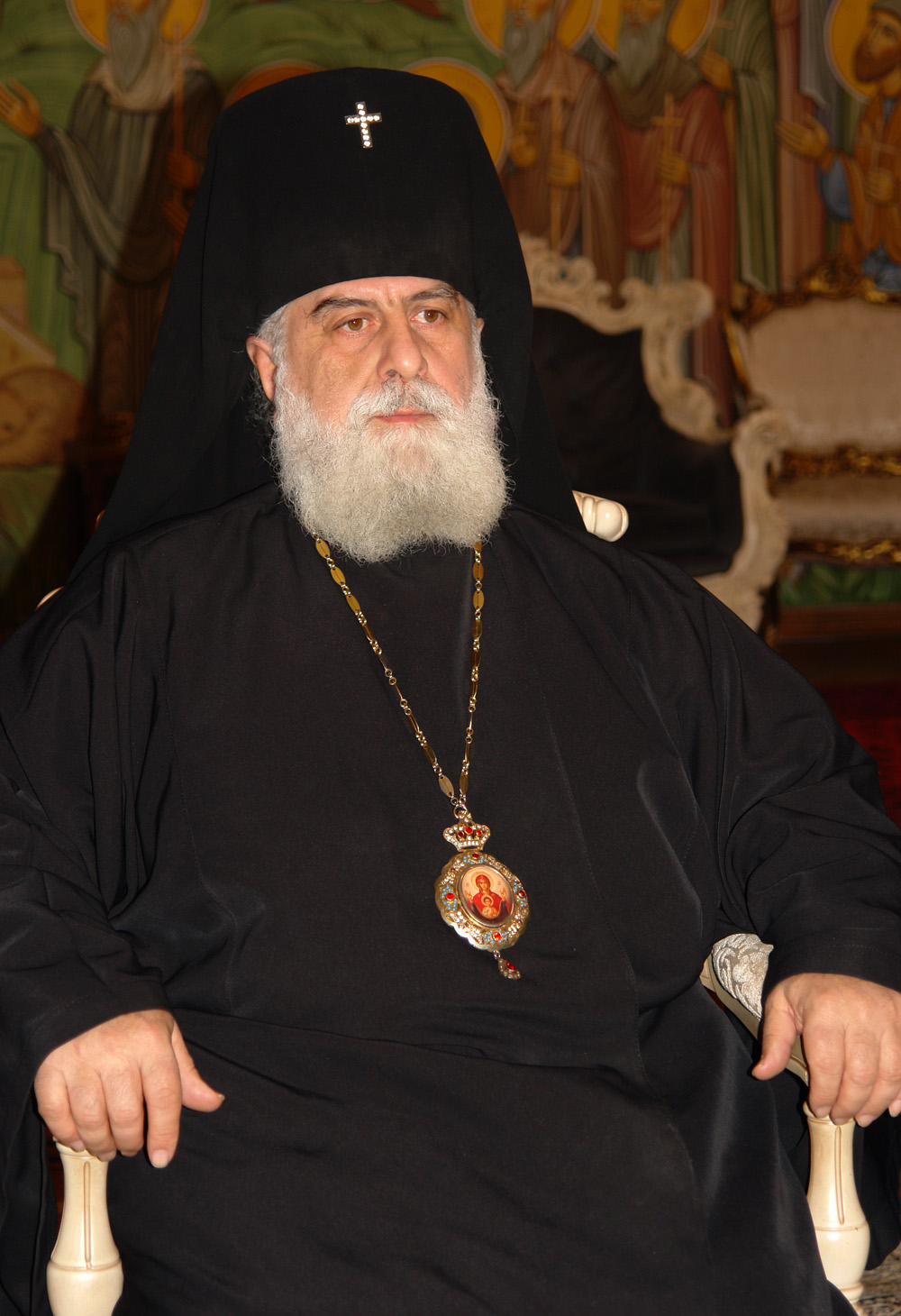
- Born: August 20, 1949; Tkibuli, Georgia
- Education: Georgian Technical University
- Church: Georgian Orthodox Church
- Ordained: 1979 (priest and monk), 1981 (bishop)
- Title: Metropolitan of Manglisi and Tetri-Tskaro

Ananias (Georgian ანანია) (Japaridze Tenghiz Anatolievich, born August 20, 1949, Tkibuli, Georgia) is the Metropolitan of Manglisi and the Tetri-Tskaro of the Georgian Orthodox Church. He is a Candidate of Historical Sciences (undertaken post-graduate studies) and is the author of more than forty scientific papers about the history of Georgia and the Georgian Church.

== Education and priesthood ==
Ananias' father was an engineer technologist. Ananias matriculated in 1966. In 1974, he received his undergraduate degree from the Polytechnic Institute of Georgia majoring in automatic means of communication.

In 1980, he graduated, with distinction, from the Mtskheta Theological Seminary. Ananias was tonsured as a monk during his studies at the seminary with the name "Ananias" after Ananias of Damascus, and on April 4, 1979, he was ordained as a deacon. On September 27, 1979, he was ordained a priest by Ilia II, the Catholicos-Patriarch of All Georgia.

In 1979, Ananias became a prior of Holy Trinity Church, Tbilisi. On September 27, 1980, he was appointed a father superior in the Alaverdi Monastery in the Diocese of Alaverdi. On March 8, 1981, he became an Archimandrite.

On March 15, 1981, Ananias was consecrated as Bishop of Nikortsminda Cathedral by Ilia II, the Catholicos-Patriarch of All Georgia. He was a Bishop of Akhaltsikhe and Meskhet- Javakheti from April 19, 1981, to December 25, 1992; and the Archbishop of Manglisi from December 25, 1992, to June 17, 1995.

In June 1995, Ananias became archbishop of Manglisi - Tsalka Cathedral and on November 15, 2001, he was erected as the metropolitan bishop.

== Church activity ==
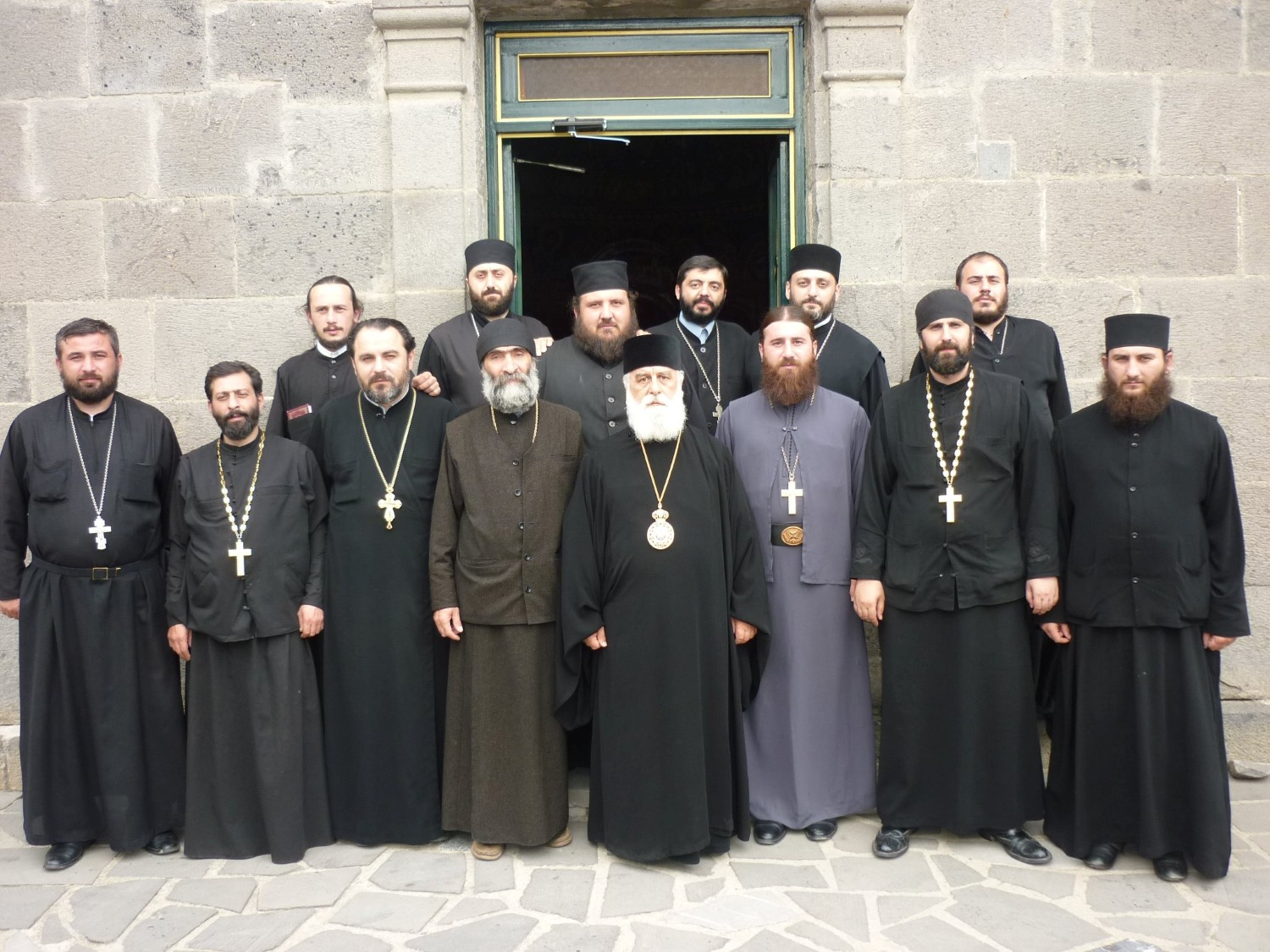
Metropolitan Ananias and his diocese.

During his episcopal service, Ananias renewed the divine services in Zarzma, Vardzia, and Saphara monasteries. He rehabilitated churches in the villages of Ivlita, Khvilisha, Akhaldaba, and Sadgeri. Ananias also opened churches in Abastumani, Borjomi, Algeti, and Koda. In 1990, he established the Akhaltsikhe Theological Seminary where he was the rector from 1990 to 1992. Since 1995, Ananias has been a teacher of the history of the Georgian Orthodox Church at the Theological Academy of Tbilisi.

== Awards ==
Ananias has received the St. Mark the Apostle Medal of the Alexandria Patriarchate and medals of the Georgian Orthodox Church.

== Scholarly work ==
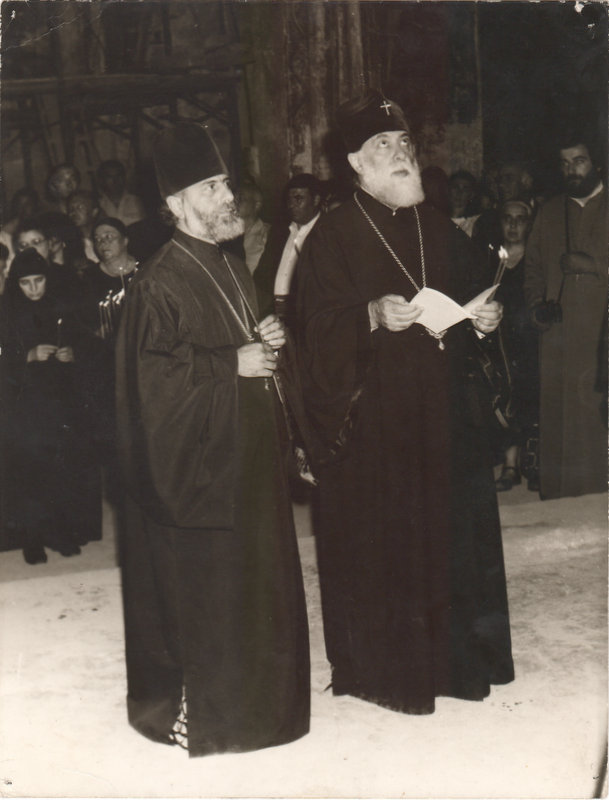
Ananias (right) with Ilia II, the Catholicos-Patriarch of All Georgia

Ananias has written books about the history of the Georgian Orthodox Church. To date, three volumes have been published and a fourth is in preparation. In 1994, he wrote a monograph about Bible stories and Georgians. His other works include Saingilo (1998); Meskheti (1998); Christianity in Georgia from the Apostle Andrew to St. Nino (1991); A Place for the Georgian Patriarchate in the Orthodox Diptychs (1993); Abkhazians' domicile in the North Caucasus (1994); The Georgian Church in the 17th century (1996); Mother Church (1996).

== Bibliography ==
=== Georgian ===
- საქართველოს სამოციქულო ეკლესიის ისტორია, ახალციხე-რაბათი, 1983–1988 წ.(In Georgian)
- ქართველთა წინაპრების ბიბლიური ისტორია ადამიდან იესომდე, 1994.(In Georgian)
- ქართული ეკლესია XVII-XVIII საუკუნეებში, საქართველოს ეკლესიის კალენდარი, 1994.(In Georgian)
- შობა, ჯვარცმა, აღდგომა და ამაღლება უფლისა და მაცხოვრისა ჩვენისა იესო ქრისტესი, 1995.(In Georgian)
- დედა ეკლესია (ქადაგებანი, წერილები), 1996.(In Georgian)
- წმიდა დიდმოწამე ქეთევან დედოფალი. წმიდა მეფე ლუარსაბ II. მეფე თეიმურაზის ბრძოლა ქართველობისათვის, ტყვეთა სყიდვა, თბილისი. 1996.(In Georgian)
- საქართველოს სამოციქულო ეკლესიის ისტორია (4 ტომი), გამომცემლობა "მერანი", 1996–2003, ტ. I; ტ. II; ტ. III; ტ. IV.(In Georgian)
- "ქართლის ცხოვრების" არმენოფილური რედაქცია, 1997.(In Georgian)
- ქართველი ერის წარმოშობის შესახებ, 1997.(In Georgian)
- საინგილო (ქართველთა გალეკება), 1998.(In Georgian)
- მესხეთი (ქართველთა გამაჰმადიანება), 1998.(In Georgian)
- ქართლ-კახეთი (ქართველთა გასომხება), 1999.(In Georgian)
- ლაზეთ-თრიალეთი (ქართველთა გაბერძნება), 1999.(In Georgian)
- ქართველი ხალხის მომზადება მაცხოვრის მისაღებად, 2001.(In Georgian)
- რეგიონალიზმი შეაფერხებს ეროვნულ კონსოლიდაციას, 2002.(In Georgian)
- ქართული საეკლესიო (სალიტერატურო) ენის ჩამოყალიბების საკითხისათვის (იოანე ლაზი), 2002.(In Georgian)
- პეტრე იბერი მართლმადიდებელი ეპისკოპოსი, 2002.(In Georgian)
- რჩევები უცხოეთში წამსვლელ ქართველებს, 2002.(In Georgian)
- სიბრძნის ხიდი მეცნიერებასა და სარწმუნოებას შორის, 2002.(In Georgian)
- პოლემიკა კათოლიკებთან (კათოლიკური პროზელიტიზმის შესახებ), 2002.(In Georgian)
- საქართველოს ეკლესიის ისტორიის წყაროები, პერიოდიზაცია და საეკლესიო ისტორიოგრაფია, თბილისი. 2002.(In Georgian)
- საქართველოს საეკლესიო კრებები (3 ტომი), 2003, ტ. I; ტ. II; ტ. III.(In Georgian)
- მსოფლიო საეკლესიო კრებები ქართველ ეპისკოპოსთა მონაწილეობით, 2003.(In Georgian)
- ორი თეორია ქართველი ხალხის ჩამოყალიბების დროის შესახებ, 2003.(In Georgian)
- წმიდა ნინოს ცხოვრება, 2004.(In Georgian)
- წმიდა მეფე ვახტანგ გორგასლის ცხოვრება, 2004.(In Georgian)
- საქართველოს სამოციქულო ეკლესიის ისტორია (მოკლე რედაქცია), 2004.(In Georgian)
- საქართველოს დედაეკლესია "საკითხავი ყმაწვილთათვის". გამომცემლობა "ციცინათელა', თბილისი. 2006.(In Georgian)
- შიდა ქართლი (ქართველთა გაოსება), 2006.(In Georgian)
- აფხაზეთი (ქართველთა "გააფხაზება"), 2007.(In Georgian)
- თეორია საქართველოს ეკლესიის პროზელიტიზმის შესახებ და მისი კრიტიკა, საგამომცემლო სახლი "ტექნიკური უნივერსიტეტი", თბილისი. 2007.(In Georgian)
- დედაღვთისმშობელი – შემწე ქართული ენისა, გამომცემლობა "მწიგნობარი", თბილისი. 2008.(In Georgian)
- ლევან II დადიანი "ხელმწიფე ივერიისა", 2008.(In Georgian)
- კონსტანტინოპოლის საპატრიარქოს ლაზიკის ეპარქია, თბილისი. 2008.(In Georgian)
- ენა და სახელმწიფო, თბილისი. 2008.(In Georgian)
- ეკლესია კუთხეთა ამკავშირებელი დუღაბი, თბილისი. 2008.(In Georgian)
- საქართველოს სამოციქულო ეკლესიის ისტორია (მესამე გამოცემა). საპატრიარქოს გამომცემლობა "ალილო", თბილისი. 2009.(In Georgian)
- დიპტიქი და დიასპორა. საპატრიარქოს გამომცემლობა "ალილო", თბილისი.2009.(In Georgian)
- საქართველოს საეკლესიო კანონების კრებული. საგამომცემლო სახლი "ტექნიკური უნივერსიტეტი", თბილისი. 2010.(In Georgian)
- ქართველთა დენაციონალიზაცია XVII-XX საუკუნეებში. საგამომცემლო სახლი "ტექნიკური უნივერსიტეტი", თბილისი.2010.(In Georgian)
- ივანე ჯავახიშვილი საქართველოს ეკლესიის ერთიანობის შესახებ, საქართველოს საპატრიარქოსთან შექმნილი საქართველოს რეალური ისტორიის დამდგენი მუდმივმოქმედი კომისიის დასკვნა. საგამომცემლო სახლი "ტექნიკური უნივერსიტეტი", თბილისი. 2010.(In Georgian)
- სტრაბონი კოლხეთის შესახებ. საგამომცემლო სახლი "ტექნიკური უნივერსიტეტი", თბილისი. 2011.(In Georgian)
- ქართულ-სომხური საეკლესიო ურთიერთობები. საგამომცემლო სახლი 'ტექნიკური უნივერსიტეტი", თბილისი. 2011.(In Georgian)
- უცხოური (ბერძნულ-ლათინური), სომხური და ქართული წყაროები წმიდა ნინოს შესახებ. საგამომცემლო სახლი "ტექნიკური უნივერსიტეტი", თბილისი. 2011.(In Georgian)
- პროკოფი კესარიელი, აგათია სქოლასტიკოსი, მენანდრე, თეოფილაქტე სიმოკატა, თეოფანე, ეპიფანე კონსტანტინოპოლელი და იმპერატორი იუსტინიანე ლაზიკის შესახებ. საგამომცემლო სახლი "ტექნიკური უნივერსიტეტი", თბილისი. 2011.(In Georgian)
- საეპისკოპოსოები ლაზიკაში. საგამომცემლო სახლი "ტექნიკური უნივერსიტეტი", თბილისი. 2011.(In Georgian)
- საქართველოს წმიდა მეფეები. საგამომცემლო სახლი "ტექნიკური უნივერსიტეტი", თბილისი. 2012.(In Georgian)
- საეკლესიო სამართალი კანონები. საგამომცემლო სახლი 'ტექნიკური უნივერსიტეტი", თბილისი. 2012.(In Georgian)
- სახელმწიფო ენის განვრცობა მშვიდობისა და სტაბილურობის საფუძველი. თბილისი. 2012.(In Georgian)
- ფლავიუს არიანე ლაზებისა და ძიდრიტების შესახებ. საგამომცემლო სახლი "ტექნიკური უნივერსიტეტი", თბილისი. 2012.(In Georgian)
- ეგრისი. საგამომცემლო სახლი "ტექნიკური უნივერსიტეტი", თბილისი. 2012.(In Georgian)
- აბაზგიის ეპარქია. საგამომცემლო სახლი "ტექნიკური უნივერსიტეტი", თბილისი. 2012.(In Georgian)
- ბიჭვინთისა და ცხუმ-აფხაზეთის ეპარქია. საგამომცემლო სახლი "ტექნიკური უნივერსიტეტი", თბილისი. 2012.(In Georgian)
- აფხაზეთის საკათალიკოსო. საგამომცემლო სახლი "ტექნიკური უნივერსიტეტი", თბილისი. 2012.(In Georgian)
- საქართველოს წმიდა სამოციქულო და მართლმადიდებელი ეკლესიის იურისდიქციის საზღვრები. საგამომცემლო სახლი .ტექნიკური უნივერსიტეტი, თბილისი. 2012.(In Georgian)
- სკანდა და სარაპანა. საგამომცემლო სახლი "ტექნიკური უნივერსიტეტი", თბილისი. 2012.(In Georgian)
- საქართველოს ეკლესიის ისტორიის წყაროები. გამომცემლობა "მერიდიანი", თბილისი. 2012.(In Georgian)
- უწმიდესი ილია II და წმიდა სინოდი არასწორი ისტორიოგრაფიული თეორიების შესახებ. საგამომცემლო სახლი "ტექნიკური უნივერსიტეტი", თბილისი. 2013.(In Georgian)
- ქალდეა (საეპისკოპოსოები ლაზიკაში). საგამომცემლო სახლი "ტექნიკური უნივერსიტეტი", თბილისი.2013.(In Georgian)
- ივანე ჯავახიშვილი და უწმიდესი პატრიარქი ილია II საქართველოს ეკლესიის ერთიანობის შესახებ. საგამომცემლო სახლი "ტექნიკური უნივერსიტეტი", თბილისი. 2013.(In Georgian)
- ალბანეთისა და ხუნძეთის საეკლესიო იურისდიქცია. საგამომცემლო სახლი "ტექნიკური უნივერსიტეტი", თბილისი. 2013.(In Georgian)
- რეგიონების თვითმმართველობა. საგამომცემლო სახლი "ტექნიკური უნივერსიტეტი", თბილისი. 2013.(In Georgian)
- საქართველოს იტორია საერო და საეკლესიო 100 რუკის მიხედვით. გამომცემლობა "გუმბათი", თბილისი. 2014.(In Georgian)
- არიან-ქართლი. საგამომცემლო სახლი "ტექნიკური უნივერსიტეტი", თბილისი. 2015.(In Georgian)
- კირიონ I. საგამომცემლო სახლი "ტექნიკური უნივერსიტეტი", თბილისი. 2015.(In Georgian)
- სამეგრელო ლამბერტისა და ბოროზდინის აღწერით. საგამომცემლო სახლი "ტექნიკური უნივერსიტეტი", თბილისი. 2015.(In Georgian)
- გურამ გრიგოლია ეგრის-ლაზიკის შესახებ. საგამომცემლო სახლი "ტექნიკური უნივერსიტეტი", თბილისი. 2015.(In Georgian)
- თეორია საქართველოს პროზელიტიზმის შესახებ (წმიდა სინოდის დადგენილება იურისდიქციის საზღვრებთან დაკავშირებით). საგამომცემლო სახლი "ტექნიკური უნივერსიტეტი", თბილისი. 2015.(In Georgian)

=== Russian ===
- Месхети (Мусульманизация Грузин), Издательство "Универсал", თბილისი. 2008.
- Краткая история грузинской апостольской Церкви. Издательство "ТУ", 2010.
- Краткая история грузинской апостольской святой Церкви. Издательство "ТУ", 2011.
- Краткая история грузинской апостольской святой Церкви. Издательство "Меридиани", 2012.

=== English ===
- Lazeti-Trialeti (1999) "Georgia's Hellenization".
- A Concise History of the Holy Apostolic Church of Georgia (2014), Tbilisi. Maia Akhviediani (translator).

=== Turkish ===
- Mesheti (Gürcülerin islamlaştırması), 1998.

== See also ==
- Georgian Orthodox Church
- Eastern Orthodox Church
