= Eghegnamor Monastery =

Church building in Çengilli, Kars, Turkey

Monastery of Eghegnamor Եղեգնամոր վանք
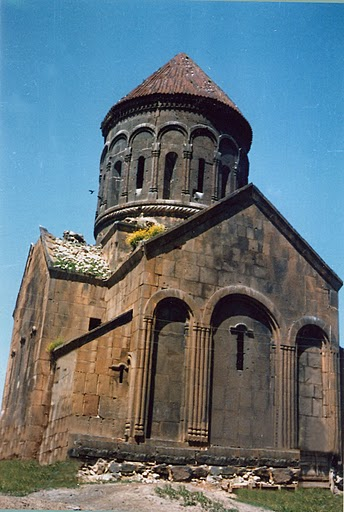

- Location within Turkey

Religion
- Affiliation: Armenian Apostolic Church
- Region: Armenian upland
- Status: ceased functioning as a monastery in 1920

Location
- Location: (Turkey) Kars province (Armenia) Armenian highland
- State: Turkey
- Coordinates: 40.1235°N 42.9133°E

Architecture
- Type: Armenian church
- Style: Armenian
- Completed: 11th century

Eghegnamor monastery is a well-preserved medieval Armenian monastery in the middle of Çengilli village (formerly Eghegnamor) village near Kağızman city of modern Turkey. Its great bulk and solidity still dominating the small, crudely built, flat-roofed, houses of the village.

== Word formation ==
Eghegnamor (Armenian: Եղեգնամոր) is a historical name of the settlement laying around the monastery. Eghegnamor in Armenian for reedy place. Çengilli is the current name of the village. It is derived from its 19th-century name, Chanli, which means "village of the bell-tower". The church is also known as Eghegnamor in Armenian literature. In another sources this monastery called as

== History ==
Eghegnamor (Çengelli) lay in a district of Armenia known as Gabeghyank', which included the town of Kaghzvan (modern Kağızman), and was a part of a larger Armenian province known as Ayrarat. This district was initially a Mamikonian possession, but in the 9th century it became part of the territory of the Bagratids of Ani. When Kars split away from Ani, Gabeghyank' became part of the Kingdom of Kars. By the end of the 19th century the majority of the village's population still was Armenian. They were adherents to the Armenian Church and called the church St. Astvacacin (Armenian: Սուրբ Աստվածածին) (Holy Mother of God). This Armenian population was deported to Armenia in 1920 when this district became part of Turkey after the First World War. The locals use the church as a communal barn.
