= Ardashen Church =

Georgian Orthodox Church in Ardeşen, Rize Province, Turkey

Ardashen Church არდაშენის ეკლესია
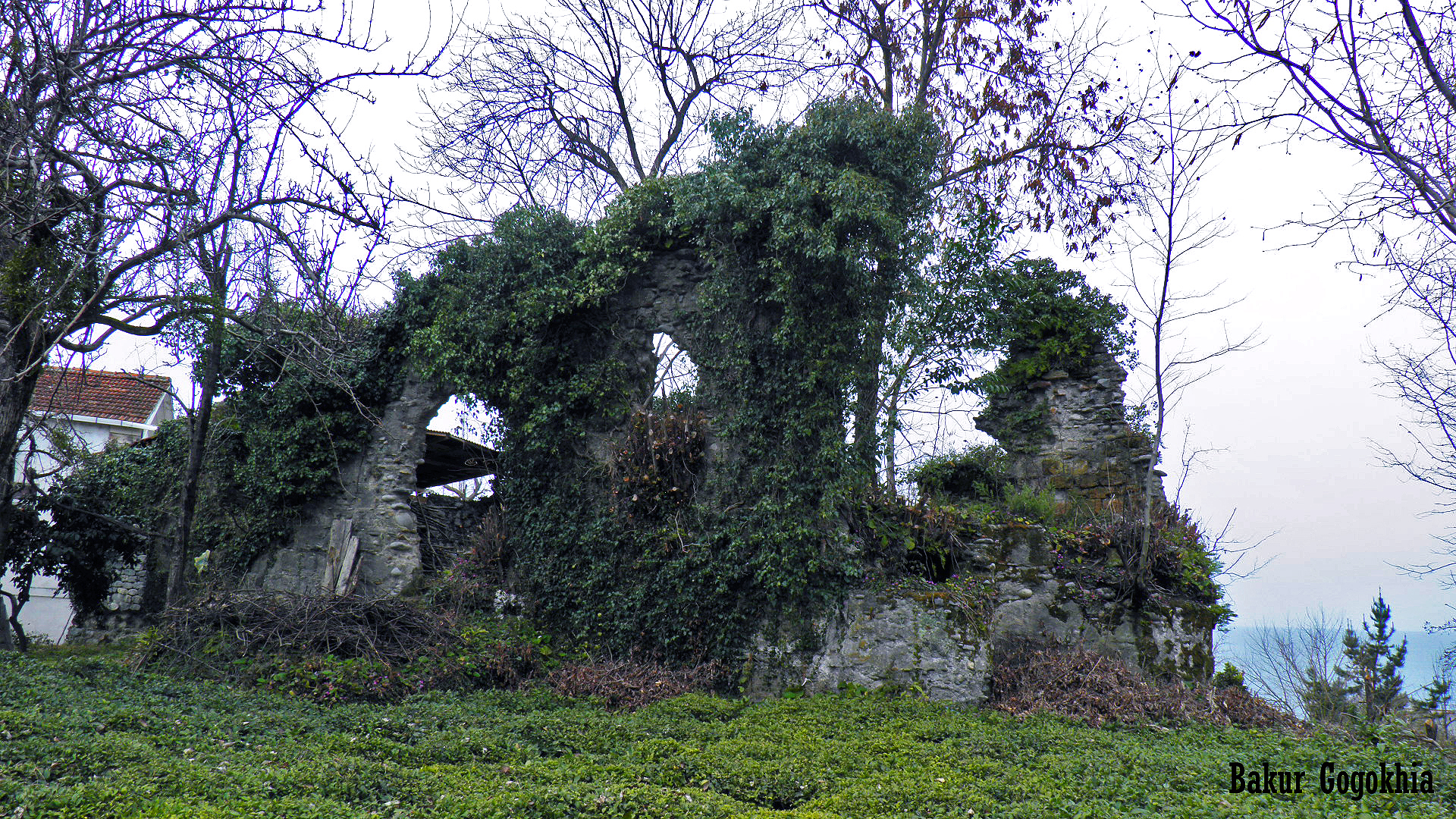
- Ruins of a Georgian church in the city of Ardashen, Lazistan

- Location within Turkey

Religion
- Affiliation: Georgian Orthodox Church
- Status: Not functioning

Location
- Location: Rize Province, Turkey
- Interactive map of Ardashen Church არდაშენის ეკლესია

The Ardashen Church (Georgian: არდაშენის ეკლესია) or simply as Jibistasi is a Georgian Orthodox Church located in Ardeşen, Rize Province, northeastern Turkey, on the border with Georgia. The date of the church building can be traced to Middle Ages that are adjacent to the so-called late-Byzantine period. The architectural canon of the church is very well studied and it belongs to the eastern school of the mid and late Byzantine periods. According to the planning scheme, similar buildings are numerously found along the whole northern Black Sea littoral.
