= Opiza =

Church ruins in Artvin, Turkey

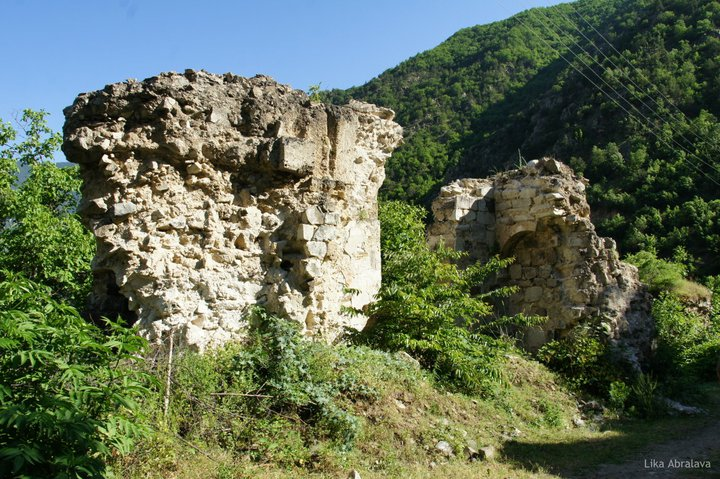

- Location within Turkey

Religion
- Affiliation: Georgian Orthodox Church

Location
- Location: Turkey
- Coordinates: 41.251944°N 41.99°E

Architecture
- Completed: 13th century

Opiza (Georgian: ოპიზა) was a medieval Georgian monastery and cathedral church located in historical Klarjeti region, now in Artvin Province, Turkey. It is one of the oldest Georgian churches in the Tao-Klarjeti region. Opiza was reconstructed after an Arab invasion in the 8th century. It is referred to by many Georgian historical persons, such as Gregory of Khandzta, Beqa and Beshqen Opizrebi.

== Architecture ==
The main church of the monastery is a domed cruciform design with an unusually elongated plan along the east-west axis. The dome rests on squinches built into the walls. To the east is a rectangular apse and sacristy. The western arm forms an undivided, elongated nave. The interior walls and dome are faced with dressed stone masonry. While the dome rests primarily on pendentives, small trompes are also incorporated, creating a hybrid transitional style of support.

The longitudinal walls of the western nave are articulated by a three-tiered arcade of columns and buttresses. A distinctive feature is the 12-sided drum of the dome, restored in the first half of the 10th century. Each of the 12 faces has a rafter protruding outward, so the cornice appears scalloped rather than horizontal, giving the roof the appearance of a partially opened umbrella. Decorative blind arches on paired shafts at the dome's base indicate growing interest in architectural ornament. The dressed masonry extends to the exterior facades as well.

Other remains at the monastic complex include a large three-aisled building that may have been the refectory, documented by the architect Andrei Mikhailovich Pavlinov in 1888 when the site was already abandoned and damaged. A 9th-century carved relief portrait of Ashot Kurapalat is preserved at the Art Museum of Georgia in Tbilisi.

== Gallery ==
Opiza, photo. i. Barshchevsky, 1888

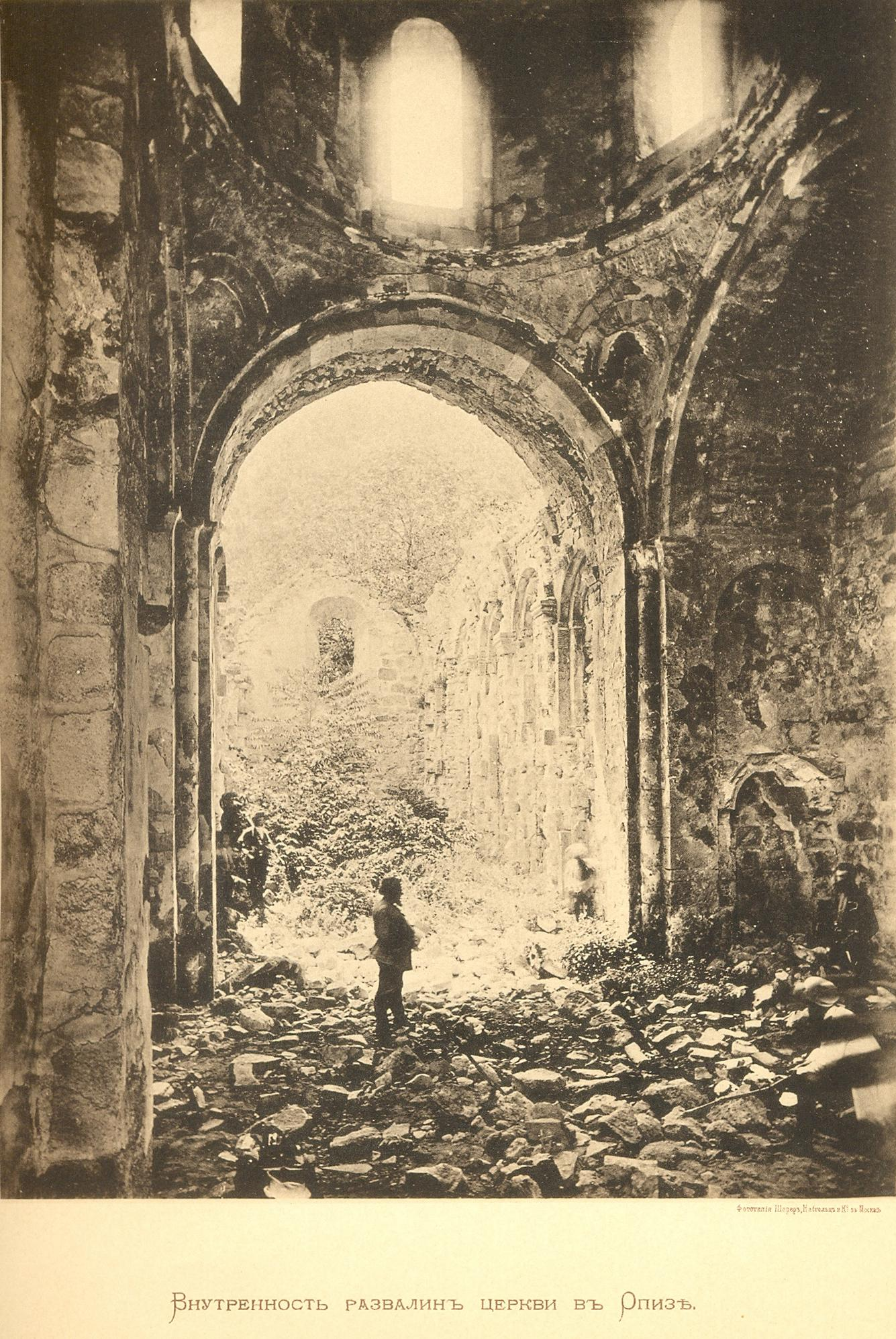
Opiza, photo. i. Barshchevsky, 1888

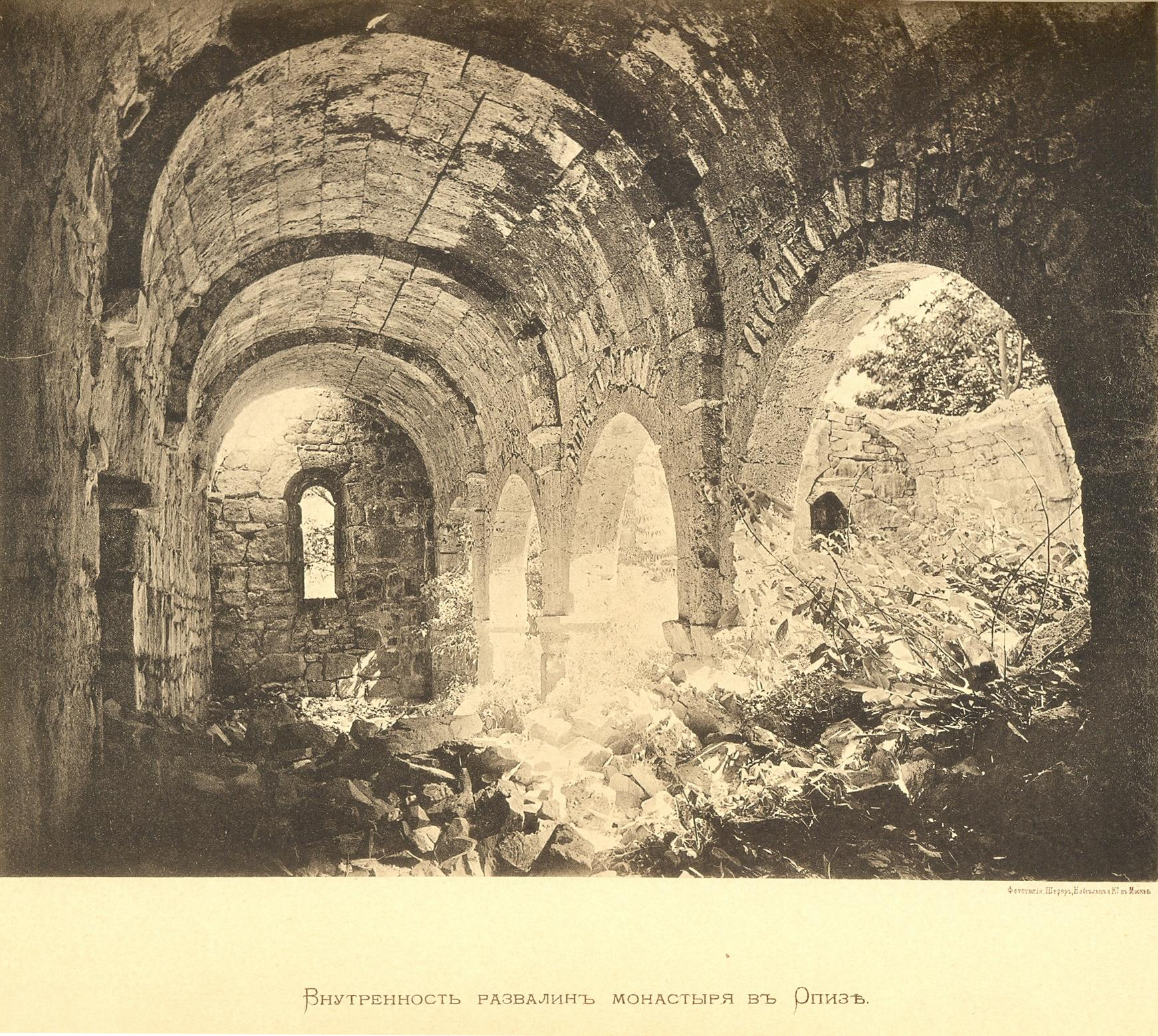
Opiza, photo. i. Barshchevsky, 1888

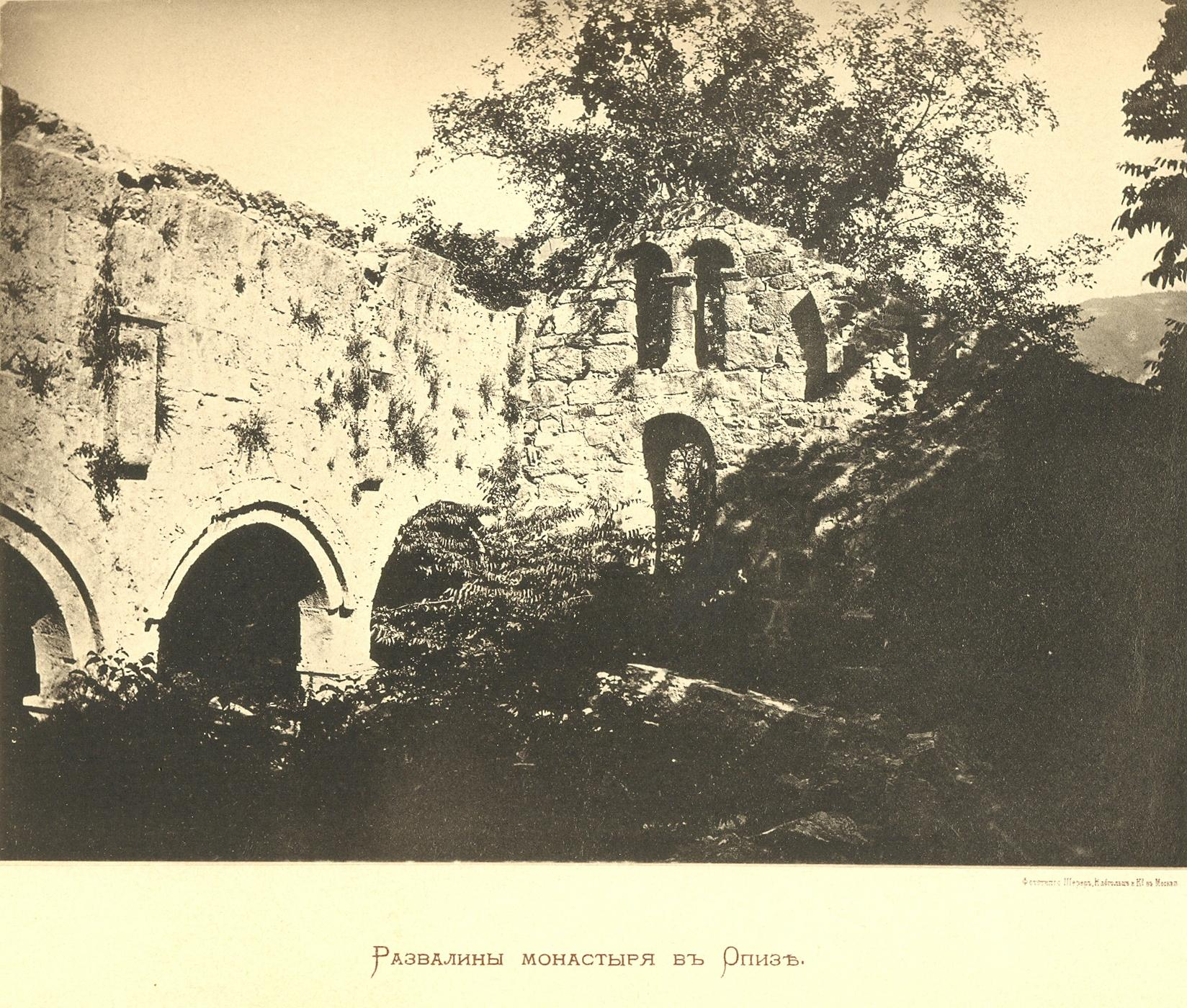
Opiza, photo. i. Barshchevsky, 1888

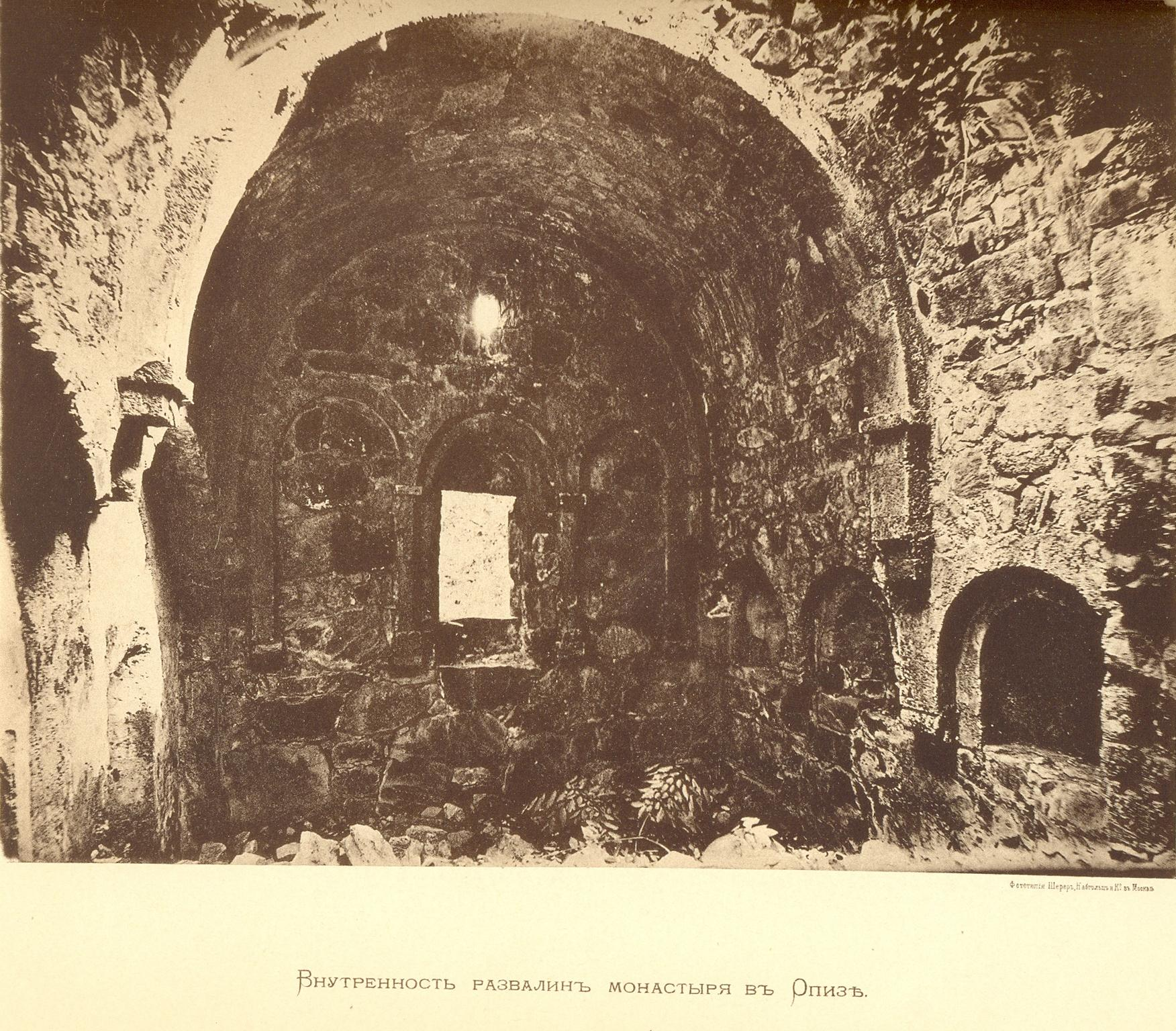
Opiza, photo. i. Barshchevsky, 1888

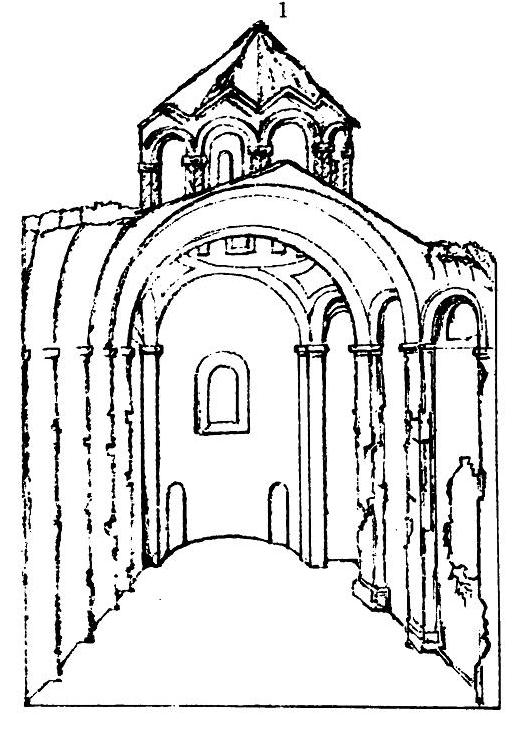
The original drawing was made by Colonel Giorgi Kazbegi during his reconnaissance journey to Ottoman Georgia in 1873
