= Parekhi =

Georgian medieval Orthodox monastery in Artvin, Turkey

Coordinates: 41°15′07″N 41°59′24″E

Parekhi Monastery პარეხის მონასტერი
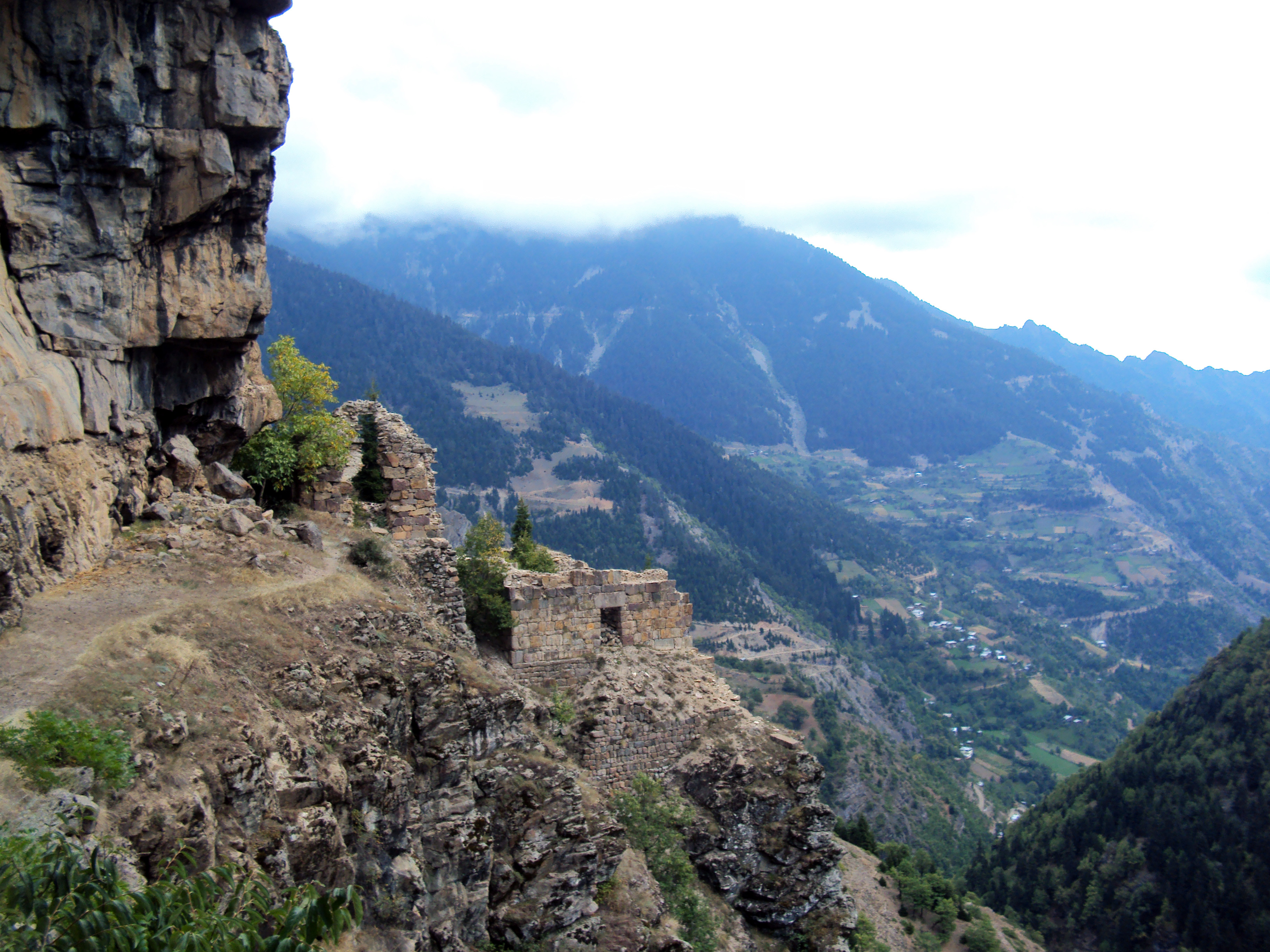
- Two main churches of the Parekhi Monastery

Location
- Location: Province of Artvin, Northeast Turkey (historic Georgian principality of Klarjeti)
- Interactive map of Parekhi Monastery პარეხის მონასტერი

Architecture
- Type: Monastery, Church
- Completed: ninth century

Parekhi (Georgian: პარეხი or პარეხთა) is a Georgian medieval Orthodox monastery in historical Medieval Georgian Kingdom of Klarjeti (modern-day Artvin Province of Turkey).

The monastery is an illustration of the activity of St. Gregory's followers. Founded in 840s as a hermitage, it soon turned into a coenobium. Monastic buildings are sheltered by a horizontal ledge and form an organic whole with the surrounding landscape. Two ninth-century churches, a single-nave structure and a basilica, stand in the middle of the monastery next to each other.

== Location ==
The Monastery is located in the Karchkhali River valley, about 15 km north of the Imerkhevi River, and 8 km away from the Bertsi Monastery. An unpaved road leads only to the outskirts of the village of Parekhi. The monastery itself is located half an hour's walk east of the village. The Parekhi monastic complex is situated on a horizontal ledge about 150 meters long, partially carved into the cliff and located 80 meters above the valley. The upper part of the rock overhangs the monastery, making it inaccessible from above.

The monastery has only one entrance from the west, whose gateway has now completely collapsed. From the gateway begins a narrow and long path, ranging from 1.5 to 5 meters wide and 150 meters long. The path leads to the dwellings of the hermit monks who lived at the Parekhi Monastery and other monastic buildings.

In the middle of the monastically complex built along the length of the rocky massif, near the refectory, a small stream flows, with a small cistern next to it. From the entrance gate to the north-west, there are two water mills, and further to the west there are fields and orchards. The surrounding mountains are covered with fir, pine, beech and rhododendron bushes. Vakhtang Jobadze believes that the stream in the monastery with its cistern and the environment around the monastery fully provided the monks with drinking water, food, as well as firewood and building materials.

== Buildings ==
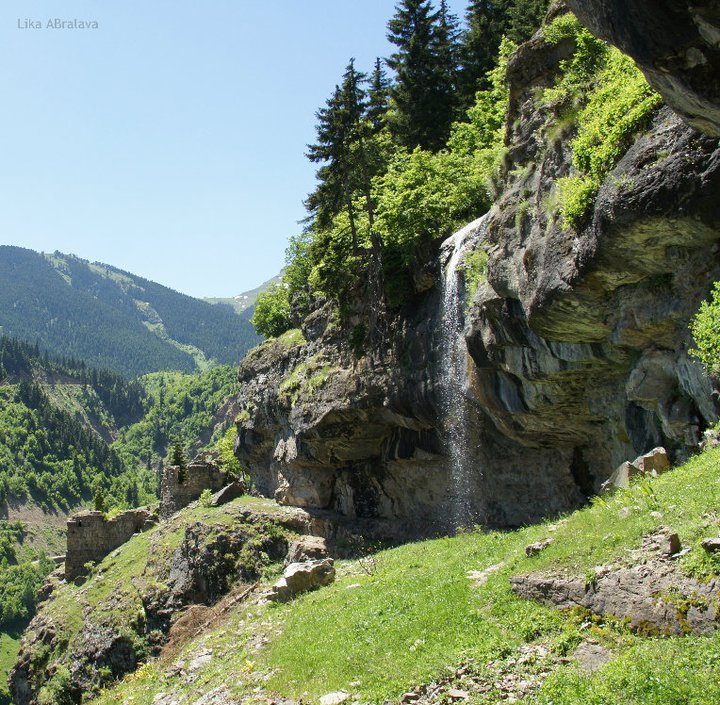

Several buildings have been preserved from the Parekhi monastic complex to this day, although each of them is more or less ruined. Among them are cells, kitchens, and a refectory. The most significant of the preserved buildings are two roughly parallel churches located south of the path. The churches are built on a specially constructed substructure, a rocky ledge.

=== Upper Church ===
The Upper Church (also called the First Church or the Northern Church) is built at the level of the path passing through the monastery. It represents an arched, elongated rectangular hall measuring 11.15 x 4.75 m. It has a semicircular apse (4 x 2.4 meters). In the apse, there are two niches 0.65 m wide, symmetrically arranged. The building material was obtained locally; the masonry is quite rough. The inner and outer sides of the walls are built of unevenly worked stones of various sizes, and the rows are uneven. Lime mortar was used in places to fill the gaps between the stones. In the interior, the stones are relatively well-worked, and the masonry is even. The west, north, and apse walls of the church are better preserved. The south wall is almost completely ruined. The interior of the church is filled with its own debris. The southern part rests on a 5-meter-high substructure. The church has a 1.2 m wide entrance on the west side. A small staircase leads to the entrance, part of which is still preserved. The church has windows in the apse and on the west wall above the entrance door, as well as on the south wall, which is now completely ruined, while on the north wall there is presumably no opening for security reasons.

Typologically, the Upper Church of Parekhi is not an exception in Georgian architecture. The construction of single-nave hall churches was widespread in medieval Georgia. In the economically poor and depopulated Tao-Klarjeti region in the 8th-9th centuries, this architectural style was particularly popular due to its structural simplicity and economical use of materials.
