= Ekeki =

10th century Georgian monastery in Turkey

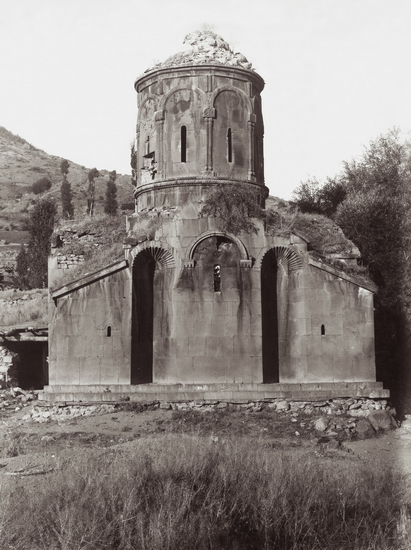
Ekeki monastery

Ekeki is a 10th century Georgian monastery located in the Tortomi valley, in the historical region of Tao - Klarjeti (currently on the territory of Turkey). The cross-domed church, built of well-polished stone, has three apses on the eastern side, housing the altar, sacristy and deacon's room. The dome's neck and some of the window jambs are decorated with polychrome stones. The doors and windows are adorned with delicate ornaments. Traces of later remodeling can be seen.
