= Ashot II of Tao =

Ashot II
- აშოტ II
- Died: January 25, 954
- Other name: Ashot II Curopalates
- Title: Curopalates of Tao-Klarjeti
- Father: Adarnase IV
- Relatives: David II (brother)
- Family: Bagrationi dynasty

Ashot II (Georgian: აშოტ II, romanized: ashot' II) (died 25 January 954) was a Georgian prince of the Bagratid dynasty of Tao-Klarjeti with the Byzantine title of curopalates.

Ashot was the second son of Adarnase IV, king of Iberia/Kartli and younger brother of David II (r. 923–937). David succeeded Adarnase as titular king of Iberia, but not as curopalates, this honorific being granted by the Byzantine emperor to Ashot. Ashot's original holding was the duchy of Lower Tao to which he added Upper Tao obtained following the death of his relative Gurgen II of Tao in 941. Ashot II also received from the emperor, c. 952, the Armenian canton of Phasiane. By virtue of holding the title of curopalate, Ashot rivaled the influence and prestige of elder brother David II, King of Iberia.

During Ashot's tenure, the Vita of Saint Grigol Khandzteli was composed by Giorgi Merchule. Ashot actively supported the development of monasticism in Tao-Klarjeti and rebuilt the main church of the monastery at Opiza. Ashot died without heir and his lands and titles passed to his brother King Sumbat I. 954, the year of Ashot's death reported by the medieval chronicler Sumbat was confirmed by a Georgian inscription found at the historical village of Merenesi in what is now the Şenkaya district in Turkey in 2017.

According to the art historian W. Djobadze, the bas-relief from Opiza which was brought to Georgia at the end of World War I and which is now on display at the State Museum of Fine Arts in Tbilisi, does not render Ashot I Kuropalates (died 830) and the Biblical King David as it has been sometimes assumed, but the 10th century re-builders of the monastery, Ashot II and David II.
