= Doliskana inscriptions =

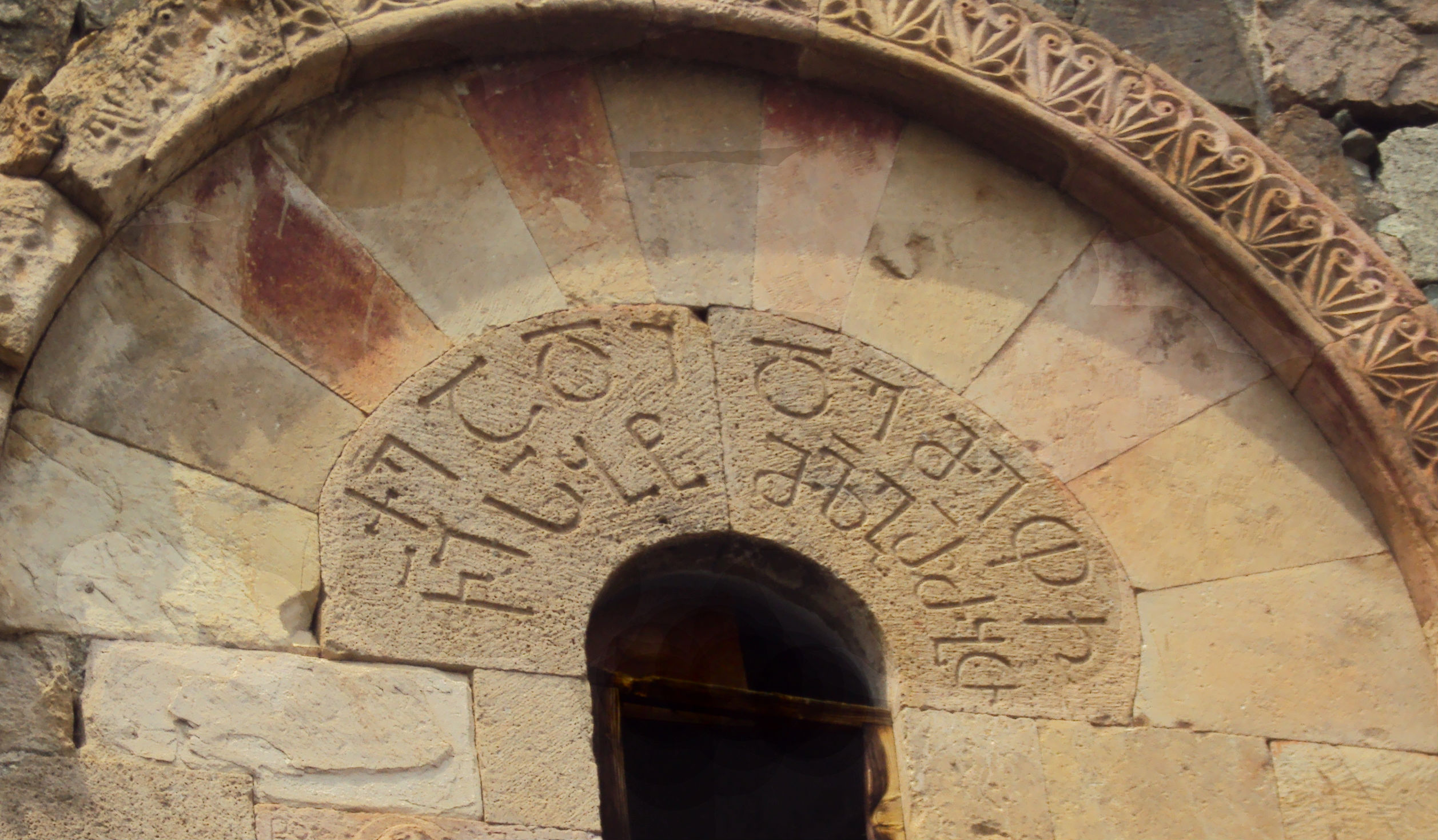
- Writing: Georgian script
- Created: 10th century
- Present location: Tao-Klarjeti (modern-day Turkey)
- Language: Old Georgian

The Doliskana inscriptions (Georgian: დოლისყანას წარწერები, romanized: dolisq'anas ts'arts'erebi) are the Georgian language inscriptions written in the Georgian Asomtavruli script on the Doliskana Monastery, located in the historical medieval Georgian Kingdom of Tao-Klarjeti (modern-day Artvin Province of Turkey). The inscriptions mention Georgian prince and titular king Sumbat I of Iberia. The inscriptions are dated to the first half of the 10th century.

== Inscriptions ==
=== Inscription 1 ===
ႵႤ ႠႣႨႣႤ ႫႤႴჁ ႹႬႨ ႱႡႲ ႫႦႢႰႻႡႧ

- Translation: "Christ, glorify our King Sumbat with longevity."

=== Inscription 2 ===
ႼჂ ႫႵႪ ႼჂ ႢႡႰႪ

- Translation: "Saint Michael, Saint Gabriel."

=== Inscription 3 ===
ႸႵႫႬ Ⴑ ჄႪ
ႧႠ ႢႡႰႪ
ႣႩ
ႬႱჂ
ႧႠ

- Translation: "Created by the hand of bishop Gabriel."

=== Inscription 4 ===
ႼႭ
ႱႲႤ
ႴႠႬ
Ⴄ ႸႤ
Ⴋ
Ⴛ
ႶႰႨ ႢႡႪ

- Translation: "Saint Stephen, have mercy on priest Gabriel."

=== Inscription 5 ===
ႨႳ ႵႤ
ႼჂ ႤႱႤ ႤႩႪႤႱႨჂ ႼႤ ႣႶႤႱႠ
ႫႤႴႤႧႠ ႹႬႧႠ
ႵႤ ႸႤ

- Translation: "Jesus Christ, have mercy on the church of our kings, O Christ have mercy."

== Bibliography ==
- Marr, Nicholas (1911). The Diary Abоut the Jоurney in Shavsheti and in Klarjeti. ISBN 978-9941-494-84-0.
- Djobadze, Wachtang (1992). Early Medieval Georgian Monasteries in Historic Tao, Klarjet'i, and Šavšet'i.
- Shoshiashvili, Nodar (1980). Lapidary Inscriptions. Vol. 1. Tbilisi.
