= Sumbat I =

Sumbat I may refer to:

- Sumbat I of Klarjeti (died 899)
- Sumbat I of Iberia (died 958)
