= Coat of arms of the Bagrationi dynasty =

Coat of arms

Versions
- Arms of the Gruzinsky branch
- Armiger: Bagrationi dynasty
- Crest: Iberian crown
- Supporters: Lions rampant

The coat of arms of the Bagrationi dynasty has been used by the former royal family of Georgia and its descendants. It is a symbol of the Bagrationi dynasty, which claims the erstwhile Georgian crown.

== Description ==
In the arms of the Mukhrani branch of the family, the shield is quartered by the cross, depicting: in the first quarter, the harp and the sling, attributes of the biblical King David from whom the dynasty claimed their descent; in the second, the crossed sword and scepter crowned with the globus cruciger; in the third, a pair of scales, symbolizing King Solomon; and in the fourth, mounted Saint George, patron saint of Georgia, with a lance slaying a dragon.

An escutcheon shows the seamless robe of Jesus, representing the holiest relic of Georgia, said to be buried under the Svetitskhoveli Cathedral in the town of Mtskheta. The supporters are lions rampant. The shield is surmounted with the royal crown of Georgia, the so-called Iberian crown.
