= Gialia Monastery =

Gialia ღალია
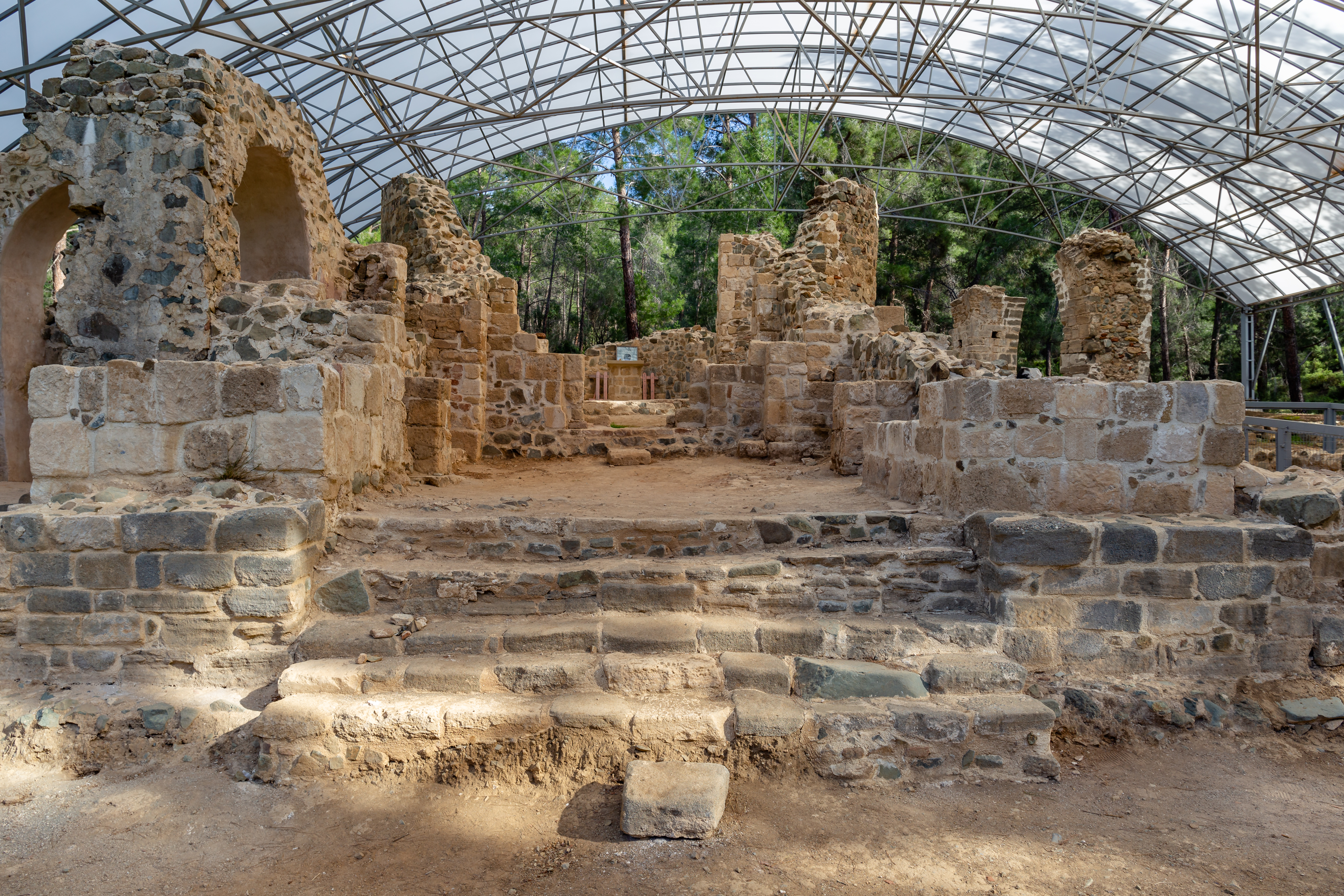
- Gialia Monastery ruins

- Location within Cyprus

Religion
- Affiliation: Georgian Orthodox Church
- Year consecrated: 11th-12th centuries
- Status: not active

Location
- Location: Paphos District, Cyprus
- Coordinates: 35.0895°N 32.555°E

Architecture
- Founder: David III Kuropalates

The Gialia Monastery (Georgian: ღალია, Ğalia; Greek: Γιαλιά) is a ruined Georgian Orthodox monastery from the medieval period. It is located in the village of Gialia, Paphos District, northwest Cyprus. The monastery is dedicated to the Virgin Mary (The Golden Virgin Mary of Gialia; Greek: Ιερά Μονή Παναγίας Χρυσογιαλιώτισσας, Panayia Chrysogialiotissa).

Located in a forest some five kilometers from the coast near the small town of Polis Chrysochous, the ruins were identified, in 1981, by the Georgian scholar Wachtang Djobadze of California State University on the basis of the medieval Georgian accounts. It was not, however, until 2006 that a systematic archaeological research followed after the Georgian and Cypriot governments agreed to jointly investigate the ruins.

It was reported in 2008 that excavation evidence indicated the monastery was commissioned in the late tenth century by Georgian King David III Kuropalates and that renovations were made during the reign of David IV of Georgia (1089–1125). The monastery is attested in the twelfth century, when it was renovated at the behest of Queen Tamar of Georgia (1184–1213). Ancient Georgian sources report that it was in Georgian ownership until the fourteenth century, and graves and other items uncovered indicate that it was in use between the fourteenth and sixteenth centuries. It was reportedly plundered and destroyed in the sixteenth century, but appears to have been in use as recently as 1935, until its final destruction by an earthquake in 1953.

Two main structures have been identified: the earlier Virgin church, and the later St. George's church dated probably to the eleventh and twelfth centuries respectively. Remains of Georgian paintings and inscriptions from the thirteen and fourteenth century have also survived.

== Gallery ==
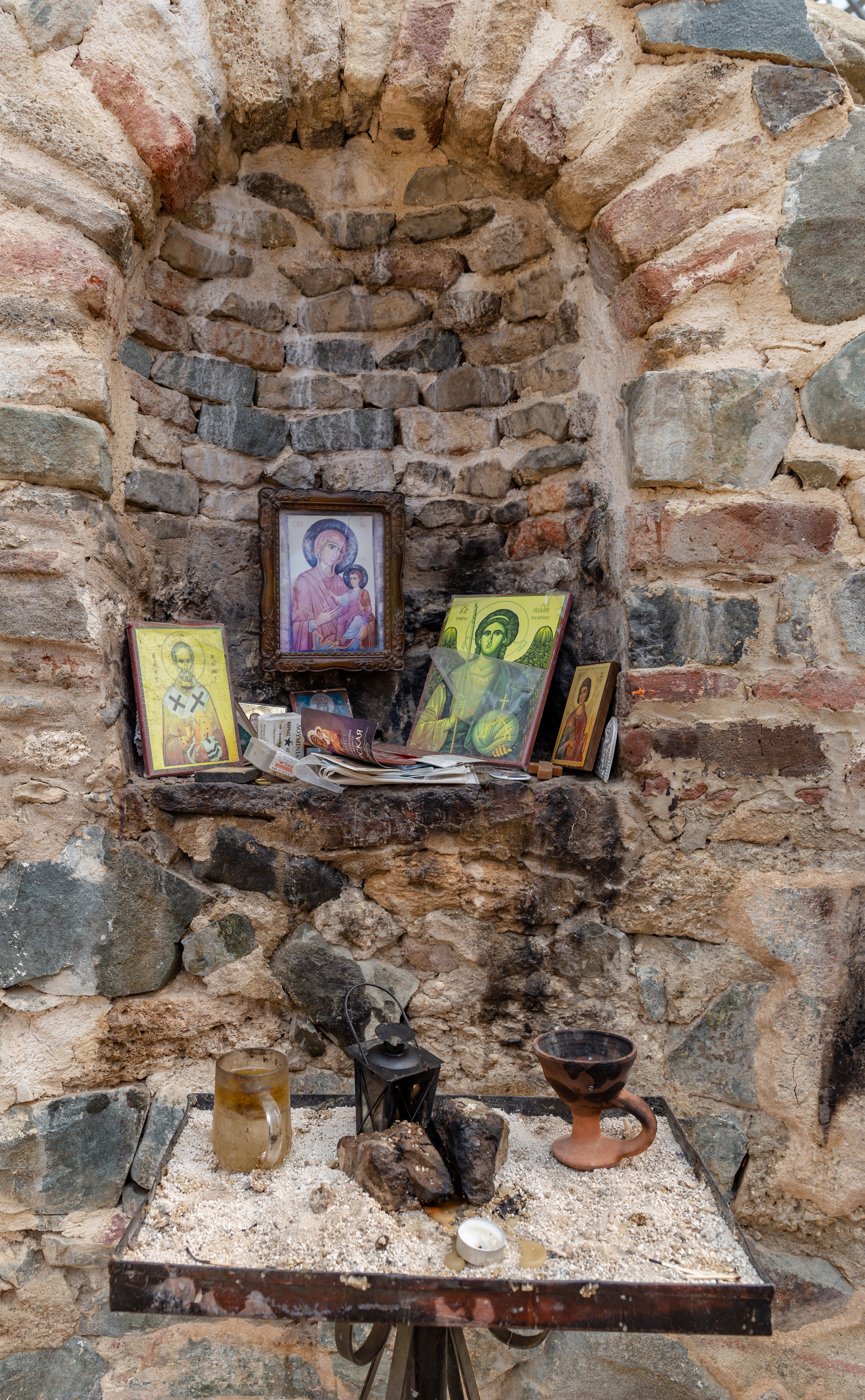

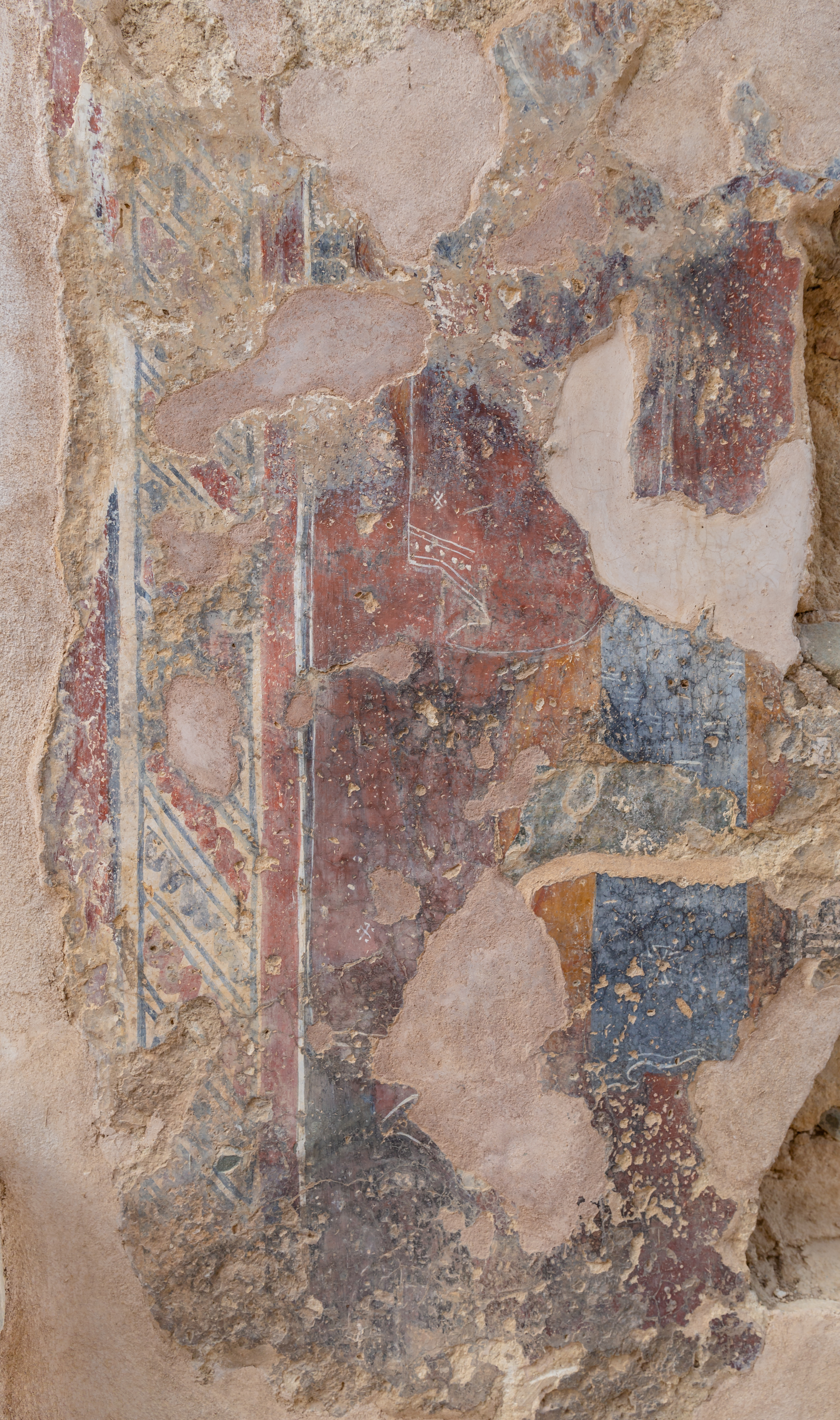
Wall painting fragments

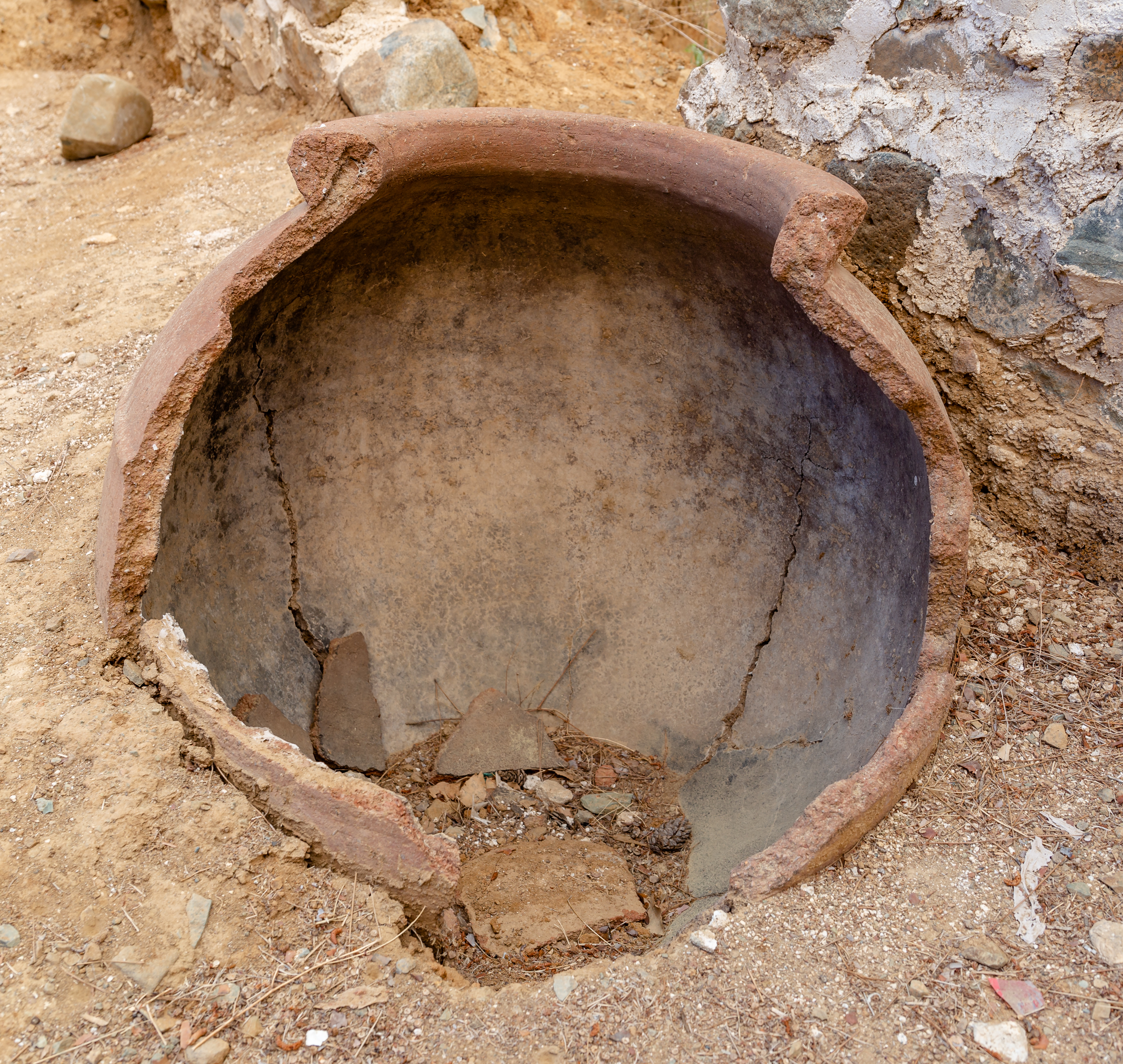
Remnants of qvevri

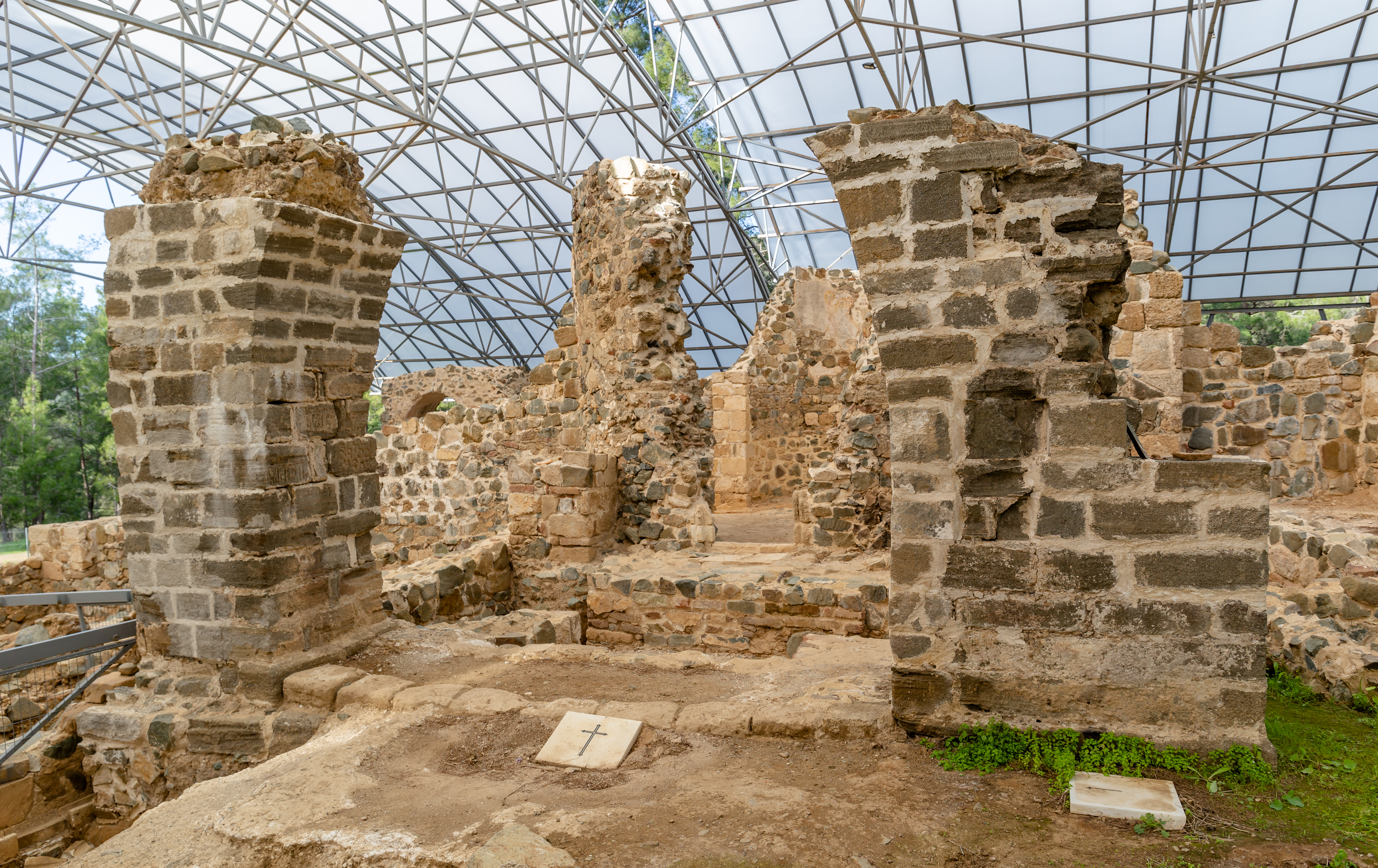

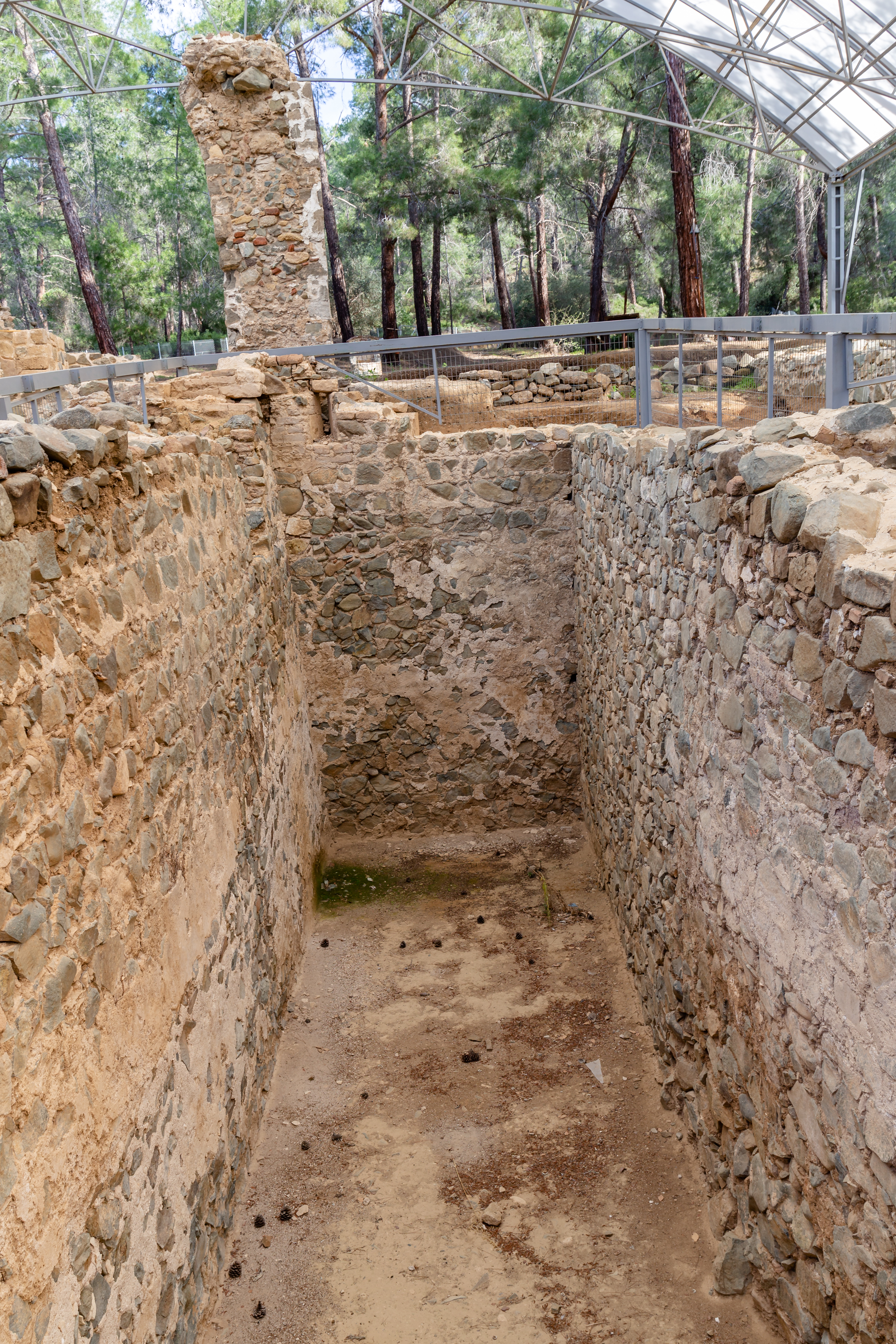
Cistern
