= Gialia =

Gialia Γιαλιά Yayla
- Location in Cyprus
- Coordinates: 35°5′45″N 32°31′54″E
- Country: Cyprus
- District: Paphos District

Population (2001)
  - Total: 142
- Time zone: UTC+2 (EET)
  - Summer (DST): UTC+3 (EEST)
- Postal code: 6364

Gialia (Greek: Γιαλιά, Turkish: Yayla) is a village in the Paphos District of Cyprus, located 11 km northeast of Polis Chrysochous. Prior to 1974, the village was inhabited by Turkish Cypriots.

Gialia is situated in between Argaka and Agia Marina, partially within the Paphos Forest.

The village has a river; it is called Gialias so the village got its name from this river. It passes through the village and it starts in the middle of the mountains behind all the way down to the beach and cuts the built up area of the village in half. The main road into the Village is to the left of the river. Gialia has approx. 120 Citizens, the majority of these being refugees who have settled here after the 1974 Turkish Invasion. 25 families or couples in the Village are Ex-Pats. Gialia has 50 houses used solely for holidays, either Nicosians coming down for the weekend or Holiday rentals. Before the invasion of 1974, the village was 100% Turkish Cypriot, whom were all either Sheppard's or Farmers. Nowadays, most of the Villagers work in the Tourism Sector or work for the Government Forestry Department. In the village, there is the forest station of Gialia, one of the biggest in Paphos area.

Also in the old days they used to have a police station next door, today it is closed; there are holiday homes there now. This can be found on the coastal road to Agia Marina, on the beachside, just before you get to the turning for the centre of the village. The river supplies the villages of Gialia and Agia Marina with water for Agriculture. There is also a Mountain spring near to the village which is also used. These are the reasons for the Government building a reservoir in Agia Marina. Gialia village spans approx. 12km2 but the built up area of the village is only approx. 3km2. Years ago, the village used to have a school but it has now been closed. There are roughly 20 children of school age in the village, the younger children attend the school in Agia Marina and the older children attend the school in Polis Chrysochous. The old school of the village is nearly at the end of the village at the top of the mountains, and it has been renovated, it is now one big building with one part of school being used as Restaurant and the other part is used by the Muktar and council of village as a meeting room/office.

The two main attractions to the village, which many people do not know about, are the Georgian Monastery and the watermill. In the middle of village, by the riverside, they have the ruins of two watermills. In the old days they had many watermills. One was in good condition so they renovated it. One is in the middle of the village; this is the one they renovated. It was renovated with Government funding through the European Community. The other ruins are at the entrance of the village on right hand side. 4 km from the center of village there is a small chapel belonging to Saint Mamas. The Monastery is a ruined Georgian Orthodox Monastery that is dedicated to The Virgin Mary. It is situated only 5 kilometers east of the village of Gialia, but still it is little known. These ruins were first identified in 1981 by a Georgian scholar, Wachtang Djobadze of California State University. It was not till 2006 that both the Cypriot Government and the Georgian Government agreed to investigate the ruins on a joint basis.

According to sources, the Georgians served in the Monastery before the 10th century and it continued to belong to the Georgians until the 14th century. After the 14th century information on the Monastery in Gialia disappears from all written sources. After the agreement between both governments was declared, and following the blessing from Patriarch of the Georgian Orthodox Church, Ilia II, and the director of the Cyprus Department of Antiquities, the Governments commissioned an expedition to Gialia Monastery on October 5, 2006, to carry out archaeological Studies. The excavation lasted approx 4 weeks and many things were un-earthed. The layout of the Monastery has now become more defined and from this they have been able to understand the chronology of the building phases. The oldest building within the Monastery is the three-aisled dome church which appears to have been built in the 10th century but according to sources, it seems somewhere between the late 11th century and the beginning of the 12th century a smaller church was attached to the north side of the church, dedicated to St George. As a result of the excavation not only the churches of the Virgin and of St George were discovered but also the porch and prothesis of the church of the Virgin, the bell-tower standing to the west of the church of St George and the portico to the south of the church of the Virgin were discovered. The material obtained through archaeological excavations – architectural details, fragments of frescoes, window-panes, a bronze cross, a silver coin, fragments of ceramic vessels – among them some glazed examples – are mainly dated from the 13th-14th century although there are also objects of the 15th-16th century. In the 16th century the abandoned monastery was barbarously plundered, the floors were dug out in every building phase and it was then exploded. Despite this destruction it is still clear that the Gialia Monastery used to be very wealthy. The badly damaged monastery was restored at the beginning of the 13th century, apparently with Queen Tamar's (1184-1210) sponsorship. One more extensive restoration was undertaken at Gialia Monastery at the end of the 13th century or at the beginning of the 14th century. It is expected that archaeological excavations at Gialia Monastery will continue.
