= Khandzta =

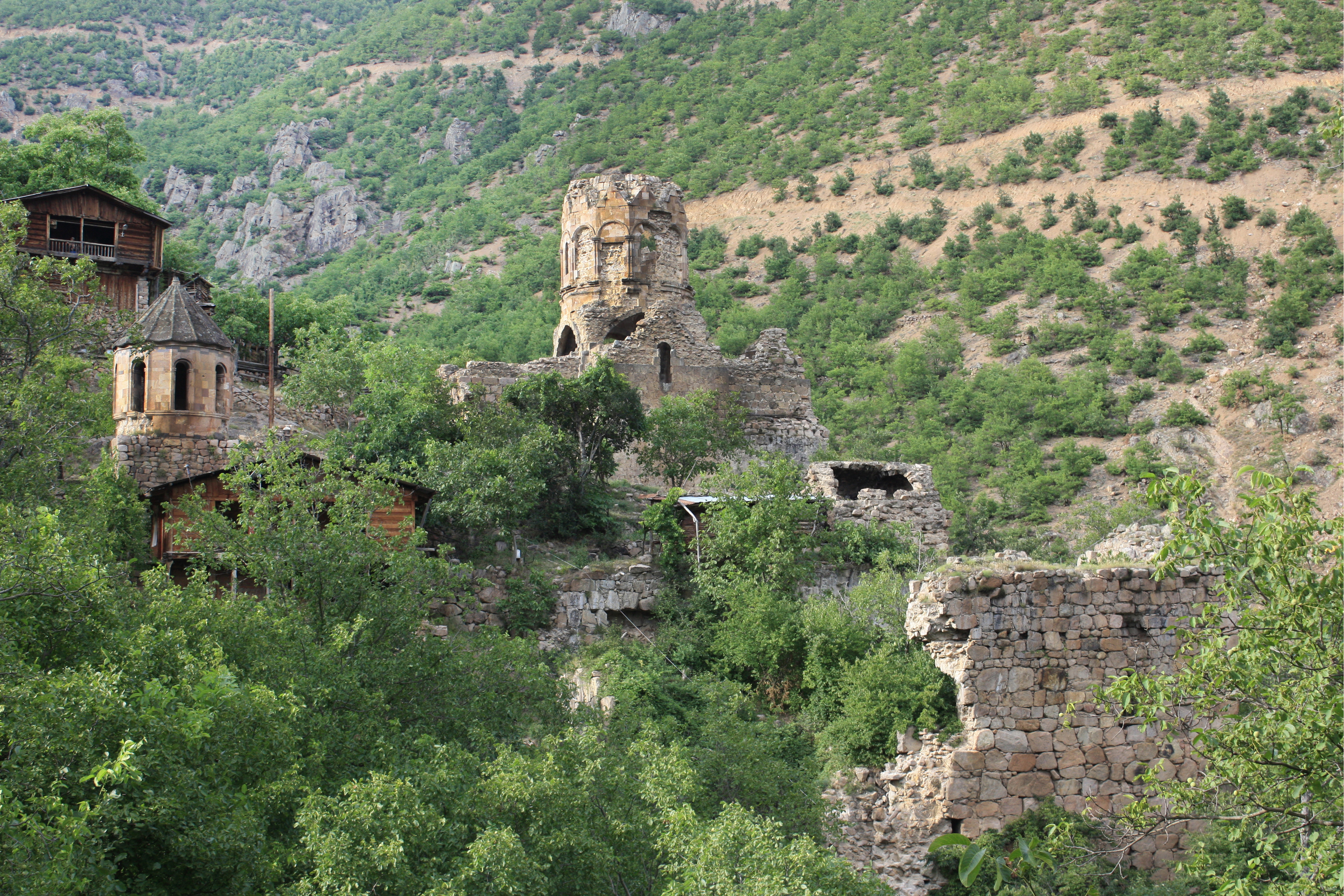
- The site in 2010

- Location within Turkey

Religion
- Affiliation: Georgian Orthodox Church
- Year consecrated: 782
- Status: not active

Location
- Location: Artvin province, Turkey
- Interactive map of Khandzta
- Coordinates: 41.2463°N 42.0708°E

Architecture
- Founder: Gregory of Khandzta

Khandzta (Georgian: ხანძთა, Georgian pronunciation: [χän̪d̪͡z̪t̪ʰä]) was a medieval Georgian monastery founded by Gregory of Khandzta in 782 AD. It has been identified as probably being the ruined monastery known as Porta, in Pırnallı village, Artvin province, Turkey.

== History ==
In 780 the future St Gregory of Khandzta moved to Tao-Klarjeti to revive Georgian monasticism in the region. He initially resided at the monastery of Opiza but then founded his own monastery at Khandzta in c782, and soon it became the center of monastic life in Tao-Klarjeti under his direction. Its influence lasted after his death in 861. In the 10th century, a local monk, Giorgi Merchule, wrote a Life of Gregory, celebrated as a masterpiece of Georgian medieval hagiography.

=== Construction ===
The first church at Khandzta was built of wood by Gregory and his companions. A dining hall and living cells were also built at that time (end of the 8th century). In 820, during the reign of Ashot I, a stone church was built to replace it by the nobleman Gabriel Dapanchuli. The present church building seems to be a replacement again, dating from 918 . The remoteness of the site made the construction difficult, as most material, notably the high-quality sandstone, was not available locally and had to be hauled for long distances. The building was completed in 941.

A freestanding bell-tower was added in the 16th century. There is also a medieval chapel whose east wall acts as a fountain. From that time, the integration of the region into the Ottoman Empire and the progressive Islamisation of the population led to the decline of the monastery, and its eventual abandonment.

== The main church ==
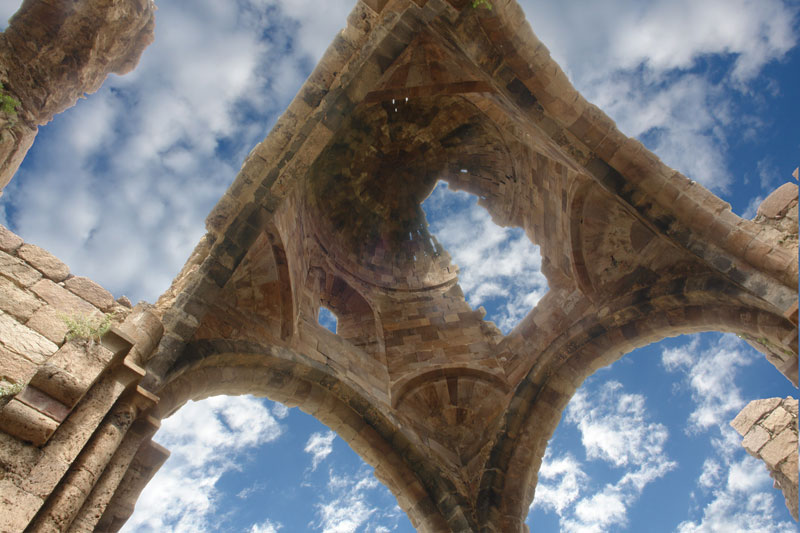
The drum and dome of the partially ruined church in 2007

The main church in the complex was built on the eastern part of an artificial terrace. Despite significant damage, its main structure has survived until now. An important part of the facade has been destroyed. Most of the cupola of the church collapsed in 2007.

== Sources ==
- Khoshtaria D., კლარჯეთის ეკლესიები და მონასტრები, თბილისი, 2005, 2009, ISBN 99940-11-94-4
- Djobadze, Vakhtang, "A Brief Survey of the Monastery of St George in Hanzta", Oriens Christianus, B. 78, 1994
- Djobadze, Vakhtang, Early Medieval Georgian Monasteries in Historic Tao, Klardjeti and Savseti, Stuttgart, 1992
- Djobadze, Vakhtang, ხანძთის წმ. გიორგის მონასტერი (მოკლე მიმოხილვა), არტანუჯი, 4, 1995
- Nicholas Marr, Дневник поездки в Шавшию и Кларджию. წიგნში: Георгий Мерчул, Житие св. Григория Хандзтийского. Грузинский текст. Введение, издание, перевод Н. Марра, Тексты и разыскания по армяно-грузинской филологии, кн. VII, С.-Петербург, 1911
- Berdzenishvili D., Menabde L., GSE, volume 11, p. 434, Tbilisi, 1987
- Giorgi Kalandia (2008). "ხანძთის ტაძრის მომავალი" (PDF). სტილი (ჟურნალი)„სტილი“ (Stili) (in Georgian and English) (26). „ომეგა თეგი“: 146–151. ISSN 1987-5355. Archived from the original (PDF) on 2013-10-03.
- А. Павлинов, Экспедиция на Кавказ 1888 года, Материалы по Археологии Кавказа, вып. III, Москва, 1893
