= Adarnase IV of Iberia =

King of Iberia

Adarnase IV

King of the Iberians
- Reign: 888–923
- Successor: David II of Iberia

Kouropalates of Iberia
- Reign: 891–923
- Predecessor: Gurgen I of Tao
- Successor: Ashot II of Tao

Duke of Lower Tao
- Reign: 881–923
- Predecessor: David I of Iberia
- Successor: David II of Iberia
- Died: 923
- Issue: David II of Iberia; Ashot II of Tao; Bagrat I of Tao; Sumbat I of Iberia
- Dynasty: Bagrationi dynasty
- Father: David I of Iberia
- Religion: Georgian Orthodox Church

Adarnase IV (Georgian: ადარნასე IV) (died 923), or Adarnase II, was a Georgian monarch of the Bagrationi dynasty who reigned in the late 9th and early 10th centuries. The son of the Kouropalates David I of Iberia, he ruled as duke of Lower Tao from 881 to 923, king (mepe) of the Kingdom of the Iberians from 888 to 923 and Kouropalates of Iberia from 891 to 923, re-establishing the Georgian monarchy in 888, more than three centuries after the abolition of the Kingdom of Iberia by the Sasanian Empire.

He succeeded his father to the duchy of Lower Tao, a border march between Byzantine Empire and Caucasus, when the latter was assassinated by Nasra of Tao-Klarjeti in 881. When the latter led a Byzantine invasion force to invade the Caucasus, Adarnase defeated him in 888 and became the first sovereign to take the title of ‘King of the Iberians’, to signal his independence from the Byzantine Empire. With the help of neighbouring Armenia, he consolidated his power and gained control over Kartli, as well as Byzantine recognition in 891 after killing Gurgen I of Tao. The reign of Adarnase IV was marked by a change in Georgia's political orientation, as it left the Byzantine sphere of influence to join Armenia and, by extension, a declining Abbasid caliphate. The king often became involved in Armenia's internal affairs and helped King Smbat I of Armenia to consolidate his own power.

A war against pro-Byzantine Abkhazia in 904 saw a powerful Adarnase attempt to annex western Georgia, leading to a conflict with Armenia. This diplomatic conflict escalated into open war in 905, an assassination attempt on Smbat I, and Adarnase's refusal to come to Armenia's help during Yusuf ibn Abi'l-Saj's invasion, an invasion that culminated in Smbat's death in 914. In the final years of his reign, he again changed his geopolitical alliance and allied himself with Byzantind to place Ashot II on the Armenian throne.

Adarnase IV was the founder of the Kingdom of the Iberians, the state that preceded the Kingdom of Georgia until 1008, and the direct ancestor of the Bagrationi dynasty who ruled Georgia until the 19th century.

The numbering of successive rulers in the early Bagratid period is very confused in that it moves between the different branches of the family. Hence, Adarnase, known as "IV" for being the fourth Adarnase as the prince of Iberia, is also known as "II" as a sovereign of Tao-Klarjeti and "I" as the king (mepe) of Iberia.

== Name ==
The name Adarnase derives from Middle Persian Ādurnarsēh, with the second component of the word (Nase) being the Georgian attestation of the Middle Persian name Narseh, which ultimately derives from Avestan nairyō.saŋya-. The Middle Persian name Narseh also exists in Georgian as Nerse. The name Ādurnarsēh appears in the Armenian language as Atrnerseh.

== Early life and the duke of Tao ==
=== Young ruler ===
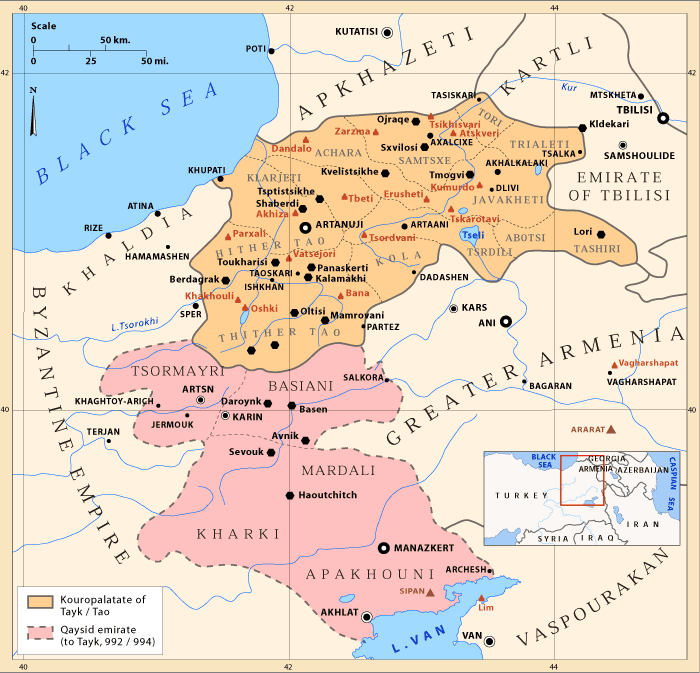
Map of Tao.

Adarnase was born in the second half of the 9th century, the only known son of the Kouropalates David I of Iberia. His father was formally a subject of the Byzantine Empire, as his title conferred by Emperor Basil I suggests, and ruled the Georgian lands of Tao and Iberia, making him the ruler of a large part of the Georgian lands for five years. He took advantage of Byzantium's campaigns towards Italy to assert his independence, allying himself with Ashot I of Armenia and the Abbasid Caliphate in a risky diplomatic strategy. In 881, at the instigation of Byzantium and the powerful nobleman Liparit Baghvashi, a conflict broke out between David I and Nasra of Tao-Klarjeti, a young cadet of the Bagrationi dynasty. David was murdered and Nasra captured his territories

Liparit Baghvashi and Ashot of Armenia succeeded in expelling Nasra, who took refuge in Constantinople, allowing the young Adarnase to succeed his father as Duke of Lower Tao. Byzantium refused to recognise him as the eldest of the Bagrations and gave the title of Kouropalates to his cousin Gurgen, continuing the Roman policy of dividing the balance of power in Caucasus, but the official reason being the young age of the new duke. Adarnase inaugurated his reign by building the cathedral of Bana (modern Şenkaya in Turkey) with the help of the architect Kvirike, whom he later appointed as the first bishop of Bana. Despite the fact that Adarnase's domains south of the Tao bordered the Byzantine Empire, he pursued a largely independent policy.

=== Victory over Byzantine ===
In 885, Ashot I of Armenia was crowned King of Armenia, declaring his independence from the Byzantine Empire and his alliance with the Abbasid Caliphate. This prompted Byzantine Empire to launch an invasion of South Caucasus to re-establish its order and in 887, Prince Bagrat Anchabadze, in exile in Greece since the assassination of his father Demetrius II of Abkhazia, invaded the Georgian coast of the Black Sea with a Byzantine navy, killed the usurper reigning in his stead and had himself proclaimed King of Abkhazia, returning the Kingdom of Abkhazia to the control of the Byzantine Empire. In 888, Nasra also landed in Abkhazia to invade Iberia with Abkhazian troops.

After ravaging many Georgian provinces without much opposition, Nasra, reinforced by local nobles and the Alanian ruler Baqarat, attacked Samtskhe and Tao. Adarnase led a resistance and was supported by Ashot of Armenia, Kouropalates Gurgen and Liparit Baghvashi but his troops were considerably outnumbered by the pro-Byzantine forces. The two armies clashed on the banks of the Mtkvari in the province of Samtskhe and Adarnase inflicted a decisive defeat on the invaders. Nasra took refuge in the town of Aspindza, where he was captured and executed on the orders of Adarnase. The victory in 888 put an end to the Byzantine invasion of South Caucasus and secured the independence of Armenia and Georgian lands, while solidifying the domination of the Bagrationi dynasty branch of Lower Tao over Iberia. Liparit secured his recognition by Adarnase as Duke of Kldekari and formed a powerful principality that was a cause of civil instability until the 12th century.

=== Consolidation of power ===
Adarnase's victory changed the course of Georgian history when, in 888, he declared himself ‘King’. This decision was not only a repetition of the similar decision by Ashot I of Armenia in 885, it symbolised the return of the royal monarchy to Georgia, which had been abolished when it was conquered by Sasanian Empire in 523, more than three centuries earlier. The establishment of the Kingdom of the Iberians formalised the claim of Adarnase and his lineage to Kartli, the province at the centre of modern Georgia and at the time at the centre of the ambitions of Abkhazia, Armenia, Kakheti, the Emirate of Tbilisi and Byzantine. The historian Valeri Silogava has surmised that Adarnase's crowning as king might have occurred, in a symbolic move, at the ancient Iberian capital of Mtskheta, as suggested by an asomtavruli inscription—probably a 17th-century reinstatement of an earlier epigraph—at the Samtavro Monastery.

The geopolitical importance of Adarnase's action has also been noted by modern historiography: by taking the title of king, he proclaimed his independence from the autocratic power of Byzantium, which did not allow any monarch within the empire other than the emperor. This also meant a new direction for the Bagrations' foreign policy, with Adarnase allying himself with Armenia and, by extension, with the Abbasid caliphate, despite the latter's decline. While the independence of the Kingdom of the Iberians was recognised by its neighbours, the status of relations between Adarnase and Armenia was unclear: according to the historian Hovhannes Draskhanakerttsi, Adarnase's policy merely followed that of Ashot of Armenia, marking a vassalage of the new king towards his Armenian neighbour, but Roin Metreveli assumed that relations were based on bilateral recognition and the Georgian king used Arab-Armenian diplomacy to declare his independence.

Adarnase IV began a policy of expansion towards the south, fortifying the city of Shavsheti and attaching numerous Byzantine provinces to his kingdom, as far as Erzurum. The king's territories now included part of Kartli, Klarjeti and Tao, and he claimed power over the whole of eastern and southern Georgia. It is possible that this expansion took place with the agreement of Byzantium, which accepted the new situation in Caucasus and attempted a diplomatic reconciliation. Thus, in 891, when Adarnase entered into conflict with the Kouropalates Gurgen, Byzantium did not come to Gurgen's help.

Adarnase IV and Bagrat I of Klarjeti formed an alliance against Gurgen, who then ruled the neighbouring province of Samtskhe. In 891, the two sides clashed at the Battle of Mglinavi in the Artanuji valley, which resulted in Gurgen's defeat and the annexation of his domains to Klarjeti. Adarnase captured Gurgen as a hostage, but the latter died of his wounds. The Byzantine Empire then recognised him not only as King of the Iberians, but also as Kouropalates of Iberia, without changing Adarnase's pro-Armenian stance. Gurgen's sons nevertheless inherited the duchy of Upper Tao, which was officially subject to the Iberian kingdom but retained a large degree of autonomy.

=== Alliance with Armenia ===
The alliance between Adarnase IV and Armenia was established in 891, following the death of Ashot I of Armenia, when the Georgian king attended the funeral of his ally. Visiting Armenia, he first visited the sparapet Abas, brother of the deceased king and governor of Kars, who himself announced his claims to the Armenian throne, but the latter, fearing Adarnass's support for the legitimate heir Smbat, imprisoned him and only released him following diplomatic negotiations with the Georgians. At Yerazgavors, Adarnase met a grieving Smbat and urged him to take active control of his kingdom in order to avoid its division: he dressed him in royal clothes and crowned him, formalising the recognition of Smbat I as the legitimate king of Armenia.

On his way back, Adarnase was again captured by Abas, who locked him up in the citadel of Kars. The Armenian Catholicos Gevorg II tried to negotiate his freedom by offering Abas two strategic towns, while Adarnase offered his eldest son David as a hostage in his place, in vain. Finally, King Smbat laid siege to Abas, before exchanging his freedom for that of his own youngest son Abas and control over the Vaspurakan.

In 895, Ahmad ibn Isa al-Shaybani, the Arab governor of Diyar Bakr, invaded southern Armenia. Smbat and Adarnase together formed a force of between 60,000 and 100,000 men to contain the invaders, but the latter managed to defeat them following the betrayal of the Gagik Apumrvan Artsrun. In 896, Muhammad Ibn Abi'l-Saj, the Sajid emir of Azerbaijan, invaded Armenia and asked for Adarnase's support. Adarnasse refused and came to Smbat's help again when Smbat lost Kars. When the emir died of illness in 901 and was succeeded by Devdad Ibn Muhamma, who made peace with the Christians, Adarnase took part in a celebratory banquet with his Armenian counterpart at Yerazgavors. In 899, as an act of friendship and to confirm relations between the two kings, Smbat in turn crowned Adarnase as King of the Iberians.

However, the situation gradually changed in South Caucasus. Prince Padla I of Kakheti and his successor Kvirike I became increasingly powerful in eastern Georgia and pursued a policy of friendship with the Emirate of Tbilisi and Sajids, while the nobles of Kartli took advantage of Adarnase's attention to the south to obtain a large measure of autonomy, which meant that the Iberian kingdom lost de facto control of the region. Around 900, Adarnase IV, seeing Armenia's inability to cope properly with the Arab invaders and to balance the growing powers of Kakheti and Abkhazia, himself began to have ambitions for total domination of South Caucasus.

=== War against Abkhazia ===
Smbat's influence over the kingdom of Adarnase IV put it on a direct collision course with Abkhazia, whose king Constantine III remained a loyal ally of Byzantium. At the centre of the conflict was domination over Kartli, the strategic centre of South Caucasus and officially under the governance of Adarnase. In 904, Abkhazia invaded Kartli and a large army captured the crucial city of Uplistsikhe, before devastating the rest of the province. Adarnase and Smbat formed a united opposition front to defend Gugark, an Armenian-Georgian province to the south of Kartli, where the Iberian king camped with his Armenian counterpart.

In order to avoid a total invasion of Armenia, Smbat decided to enter into negotiations with Constantine III, without consulting Adarnase. During a round of talks, Adarnase hired Armenian soldiers to capture Constantine III and take him hostage, before sending him to Smbat. The king of Abkhazia was then imprisoned in Ani, putting an end to a short-lived but decisive war: the Kartli returned to the territories of Adarnase, while the throne of Abkhazia became de facto vacant. In Kutaisi, a faction of Abkhazian nobles attempted to seize power through a coup d'état, a manoeuvre quickly supported by Adarnasse IV.

Soon, the lack of power in Abkhazia opened the door for Adarnass to create a major power in south Caucasus by taking control of his neighbour and attempting to unify Georgia. King Smbat, who feared an independent unified Georgia more than a pro-Byzantine Abkhazia, decided to make a deal with Constantine III who, after four months in captivity, was released and annexed Kartli to Abkhazia in exchange for Armenian influence over Kutaisi and the appointment of Armenian governors in the Abkhazian provinces.

The annexation of Kartli by Abkhazia changed the balance of power in south Caucasus until the unification of the Kingdom of Georgia in 1008. Adarnase saw this action as a betrayal by Smbat, condemning the alliance between the two kings.

=== Breaking the alliance ===
In 905, Adarnase IV began to develop a plan to invade Armenia, kill King Smbat and remove his line from the throne in order to annex his kingdom. He was supported by leading Armenian nobles who offered to take the Armenian crown, including a certain Hassan, a powerful nakharar from western Armenia. He invaded the province of Shirak, before capturing the city of Ani with Hassan's help. With Smbat travelling in Tashir, Adarnase captured Yerazgavors, the Armenian capital, and sent a battalion to assassinate the Armenian king, an attempt that failed when nobles changed their alliance and warned Smbat. Adarnase was soon forced to abandon his conquests and took refuge in his domains in the Lower Tao, where he was defeated in battle. As a peace pledge, he offered his eldest son David as a hostage to the Armenian court, who helped Smbat identify his traitors. Smbat had many nobles executed and sent others into exile in Abkhazia and Byzantium.

In 905, Yusuf ibn Abi'l-Saj, the Sajid emir of Azerbaijan, revolted against his Abbasid overlord and Smbat was instructed by the Caliph Al-Muktafi to put an end to the rebellion. However, the emir managed to invade Georgian territory and subdued Kakheti and the Emirate of Tbilisi, before devastating Armenia for the first time. When Smbat asked Adarnase for help, the latter refused and allied himself with Sajid, who expelled the Abkhazians from Kartli (returning the province to Adarnasse's control). In 907, Adarnasse once again found himself on the side of the invaders when they ravaged Armenia once again.

In 909, Yusuf returned to devastate South Caucasus and attacked Samtskhe and Javakheti, two provinces officially part of the Kingdom of the Iberians but under the direction of the powerful Duke Ashot the Immature. In 912, he laid siege to Qeuli, which was defended by the Armenian army and, due to a lack of Georgian defence, a militia led by a young Gobron: the latter was eventually captured and martyred by the Sajids along with 133 of his troops, while Adarnase tried to ransom them to freedom. While the Iberian king did not get involved in this conflict and supported Yusuf, the numerous invasions led to a devastating famine in his domains of Adjara and Shavsheti.

In 914, Yusuf headed for Armenia, forcing Smbat to take refuge in Abkhazia. But he was captured on his way by Adarnase's troops, who handed him over to the emir. Smbat was assassinated and Adarnase invaded Armenia, preventing the young Ashot II from taking the crown. Yusuf eventually expelled Adarnase from Kartli, but the king managed to impose his domination over the Christian world of south Caucasus.

=== End of reign ===
Yusuf made Smbat's nephew Ashot the sparapet king of Armenia in 914, while the new caliph Al-Muqtadir accepted the new situation in South Caucasus, pardoned Yusuf and recognised the Ashot the sparapet as king. Adarnase, still allied with the Sajid, initially protected the usurper against Ashot II, son of Smbat, who was waging a war of resistance. But fearing Yusuf's power, the Iberian king changed his allegiance again and headed for Armenia with a large army, crowning Ashot II as the king of Armenia in 915 with the help of king George II of Abkhazia. Adarnase rose to the head of a south Caucasian Christian resistance that attempted to expel the Muslims, but the devastation caused by the conflict in the Armenian provinces prompted Catholicos Hovhannes Draskhanakerttsi to beg Adarnase to retreat, a request accepted by the Iberian king.

Ashot II, supported by a Byzantine army, finally seized power in 921-922 and the regional geopolitical balance changed again: Ashot II's Armenia and Adarnase IV's Iberia aligned themselves with Byzantium and Abkhazia, putting an end to Abbasid influence in the region. When a plot to assassinate Ashot II was revealed to have been prepared by Abkhazia, Adarnase and Ashot went to war against George II.

In 918, Gurgen II became Duke of Upper Tao and his ambition led him to oppose Adarnase and Ashot when he allied himself with Abas. Gurgen was defeated in battle in 922 but this was not enough to dampen his aspirations and he increased his power considerably after the death of Adarnase. In the last months of his reign, Sahak Sevada, Prince of Gardman, invaded Adarnase's territories and Adarnase managed to expel him with the help of Ashot II.

With his domains extending as far as Erzurum after receiving numerous Byzantine territories as gifts, Adarnase IV spent the end of his reign to building numerous churches throughout his kingdom. He died in 923, leaving the Kingdom of the Iberians to his eldest son David. Byzantium, instead of solidifying the latter's reign, continued its old policy of division and offered the title of Kouropalates to Adarnase's second son, Ashot. Bagrat, the third son, became Magistros.

== Family ==
Adarnase's wife is not known. He was survived by five children:

- David II of Iberia (died 937), King of the Iberians (923–937).
- Ashot II of Tao (died 954), Kouropalates of Iberia (923–954) and duke of Lower Tao (937–954).
- Bagrat I of Tao (died 945), Magistros of Iberia (923–945) and the duke of Upper Tao (941 – 945).
- Sumbat I of Iberia (died 958), King of the Iberians (937–958), Kouropalates and duke of Lower Tao (954–958).
- Anonymous daughter, married Constantine III of Abkhazia
- Probably, an anonymous daughter, married to sparapet Abbas, brother of Ashot I of Armenia.

== Bibliography ==
- Asatiani, Nodar; Janelidze, Otar (2009). History of Georgia. Tbilisi: Publishing House Petite. ISBN 978-9941-9063-6-7.
- Brosset, Marie-Félicité (1849). Histoire de la Géorgie, depuis l'Antiquité jusqu'au XIXe siècle - 1re partie. St. Petersburg: Saint Petersburg Academy of Sciences.
- Brosset, Marie-Félicité (1851). Additions et éclaircissements à l'histoire de la Géorgie depuis l'Antiquité jusqu'en 1469 de J.-C [Additions and clarifications to the history of Georgia from Antiquity to AD 1469] (in French). St.-Petersbourg: Imprimerie de l'Académie Impériale des Sciences.
- Eastmond, Antony (1998). Royal Imagery in Medieval Georgia. University Park: Pennsylvania State Press. ISBN 0-271-01628-0.
- Kaukhchishvili, Simon (1955). La vie du Karthli — Texte complet et commentaires le concernant (in Georgian). Tbilisi: Publication d'État. ISBN 99928-43-44-6..
- Metreveli, Roin; et al. (1998). Ქართული დიპლომატიის ისტორიის ნარკვევები [Essays on the history of diplomacy] (in Georgian). Tbilisi: Université d'État de Tbilissi Ivané Djavakhichvili. ISBN 5-511-00896-6.
- Rapp, Stephen H. (2003). Studies In Medieval Georgian Historiography: Early Texts And Eurasian Contexts. Leuven: Peeters. ISBN 90-429-1318-5.
- Rayfield, Donald (2012). Edge of Empires, a History of Georgia. London: Reaktion Books. ISBN 978-1-78023-070-2.
- Salia, Kalistrat (1980). Histoire de la nation géorgienne. Paris: Édition Nino Salia.
- Suny, Ronald Grigor (1994). The Making of the Georgian Nation. Indiana University Press. ISBN 978-0253209153.

Preceded by Interregnum	King of Iberia; 888–923	Succeeded by David II
