= Valeri Silogava =

Georgian historian and professor

- Valeri Silogava
- Born: April 20, 1945 poti, Georgian Soviet Socialist Republic
- Died: March 17, 2011 (aged 65); Akhaltsikhe
- Occupations: Historian, scientist

Valeri Silogava (Georgian: ვალერი სილოგავა; April 20, 1945 – March 17, 2011) was a Georgian historian and professor.

== Education ==
In 1963 he graduated from Poti V Secondary School. In 1969 he graduated with honors from the Faculty of History of Tbilisi State University. With the recommendation of Shota Meskhia, he was sent to the post-graduate course of the Korneli Kekelidze Institute of Manuscripts, where he took a course in Source Studies and Historiography under Professor Nodar Shoshiashvili. In 1970, while still a postgraduate student, Valeri Silogava started working at the Institute of Manuscripts, where he developed as a researcher and developed his circle of scientific interests – epigraphy, paleography, diplomatics.

In 1972 he graduated from the Institute with a degree in Source Studies and Historiography.

In 1972 he defended his PhD dissertations ("Lapidary inscriptions of Western Georgia IX-XVIII centuries as a historical source"), and in 1989 his doctoral dissertations ("Written Monuments of Svaneti").

== Career ==
Valeri Silogava was a leading researcher at the Georgian State Museum since 1990 and was Head of the Department of Georgian History at the Akhaltsikhe Branch of Tbilisi State University. Since 2005 he was a leading researcher at the Institute of Manuscripts and head of the Department of Archival Funds.

In 2006, he was elected an associate professor at the Faculty of Humanities of Tbilisi State University. Concurrently, he was a professor at Akhaltsikhe Teaching University, leading lecture courses in the history of Georgia and the Georgian Church, source studies, palaeography and historiography.

== Awards and honours ==
- Order of Honor (2001)
- Ekvtime Takaishvili Award of the Georgian National Academy of Sciences (2009)

== Literature ==
- Kalandia G., Kikvidze L., "Valeri Silogava (Memoirs, Scientific Articles)", Tbilisi, 2011
- Discovery in the Oshki Temple (Interview with Valeri Silogava), Khvamli No.3–4, 2003 – pp. 29–31
