= David II of Iberia =

David II

King of the Iberians
- Reign: 923–937
- Predecessor: Adarnase IV of Iberia
- Successor: Sumbat I of Iberia
- Died: 937
- Dynasty: Bagrationi
- Father: Adarnase IV of Iberia
- Religion: Georgian Orthodox Church

David II (Georgian: დავით II) (died 937) was a member of the Georgian Bagratid dynasty of Tao-Klarjeti and titular king (mepe) of Iberia from 923 until his death.

The eldest son and ultimate successor of Adarnase IV of Iberia as king of Iberia, David's control was limited to the duchies of Queli-Javakheti, and Lower Tao as the core lands of Inner Iberia (Shida Kartli) were under the Abkhazian control. In spite of his royal title and unlike his father, David did not bear the traditional high Byzantine title of curopalates which was bestowed by the emperor upon David's younger brother Ashot II. As a result, David's influence and prestige were overshadowed by those of his younger brother, Ashot II. As evidenced by Constantine Porphyrogenitus's De Administrando Imperio, David only had the title of magistros which he shared with his relative Gurgen II of Tao. Both Gurgen and David resolutely opposed the Byzantine takeover of the Bagratid town of Artanuji, a fief of Gurgen's father-in-law, Ashot the Swift. During the dispute, David even arrested the Byzantine plenipotentiary, the patrikios Constans, who was dispatched to create Gurgen magistros and bring David's brother Ashot for investiture as curopalates.

David died childless, being succeeded by his brother Sumbat I.

Preceded by Adarnase IV	King of Iberia; 923–937	Succeeded by Sumbat I
