= Georgian Crown Jewels =

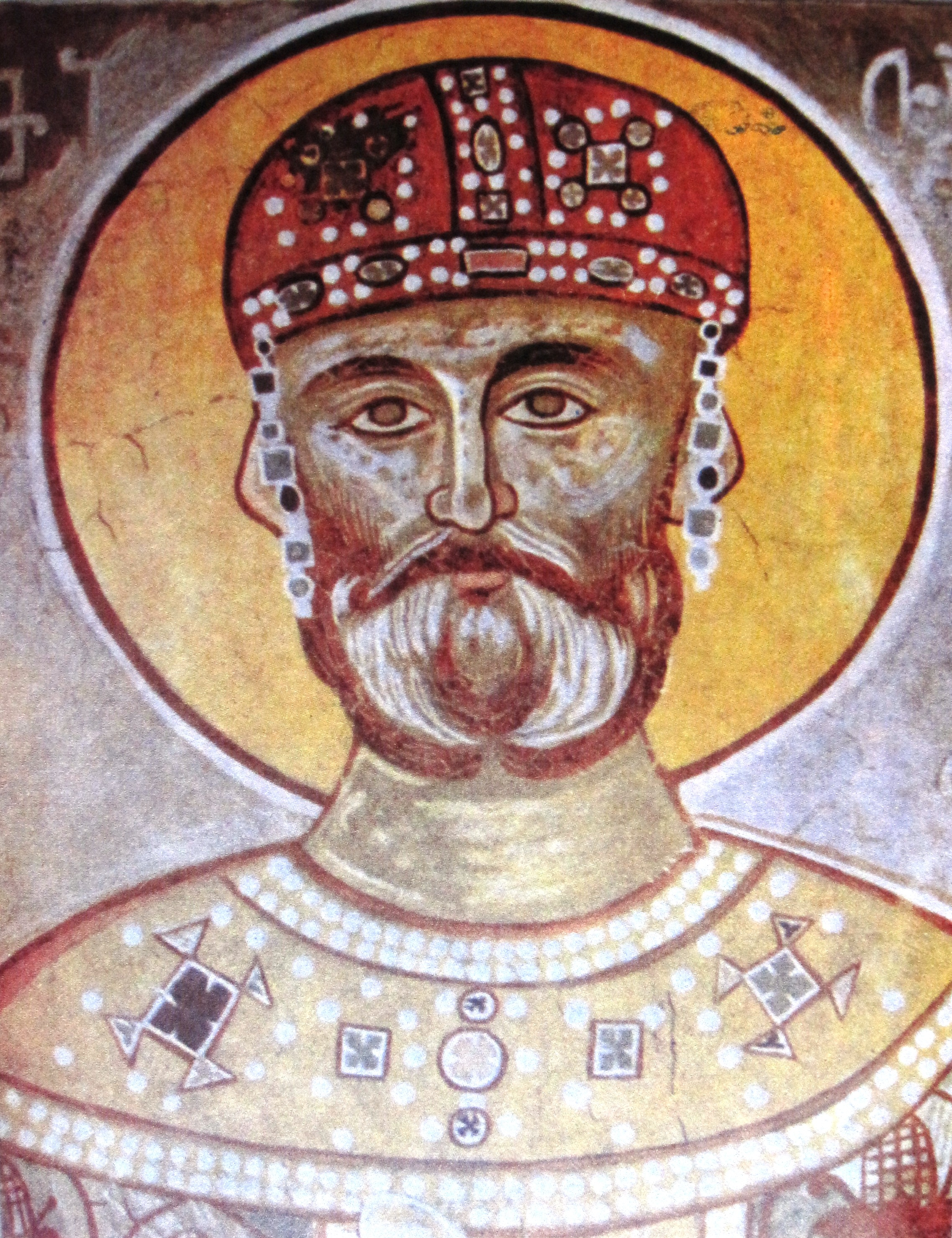
King David IV's imperial crown with pendilia. A fresco from Gelati.

The Georgian Crown Jewels (Georgian: ქართული სამეფო რეგალია, romanized: kartuli samepo regalia) were the regalia and vestments worn by the monarchs of Georgia during the coronation ceremony and at other state functions. The last Georgian monarchs, Heraclius II and George XII, had their regalia invested, respectively in 1783 and 1798, from the Russian tsars, their official protectors. Of these royal jewels—a crown, sword, and scepter—only the latter staff survives, in the collection of the Kremlin Armoury in Moscow.

== Early history ==
The medieval Georgian monarchs are portrayed on coins, medals, sculptured reliefs, and in frescoes wearing crowns and royal robes, frequently of Byzantine imperial design, and there is also some documentary evidence about some of their regalia. But none of these specimens has come down to us. A crown attributed to the kings of Imereti, in western Georgia, was still preserved in the treasury of the Gelati Monastery, in 1896, when it was listed, in an inventory of the treasury, among articles not used for divine service and described as a "royal crown, sewn with gold and silver and adorned with precious stones, seven small crosses decorated with stones of various colours gave it great beauty and glitter." The crown is currently lost.

== Last kings of Georgia ==
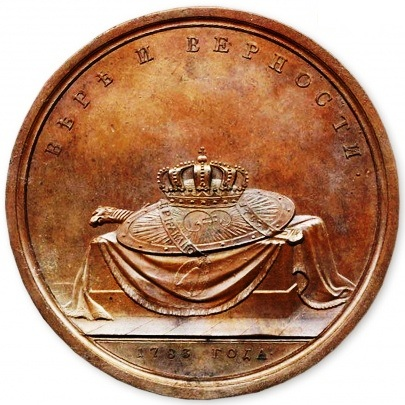
A 1790 commemorative medal depicting Heraclius II's regalia.

=== Heraclius II ===
The first modern, Westernized, regalia were made for King Heraclius II, king of Kartli and Kakheti in eastern Georgia, in 1783, on the occasion of his acceptance the protectorate of the Russian Empire in the Treaty of Georgievsk. These were a crown and other "symbols of investiture" commissioned by the tsarina Catherine II from Louis David Duval, a court jeweler. These items were carried away by the Iranian ruler Agha Muhammad Khan on his sack of Heraclius' capital of Tiflis (Tbilisi) in 1795 and have since been lost. Only pictorial depictions survive, such as on the reverse of a medal, commemorative of the Treaty of Georgievsk, produced by Timofey Ivanov of the Saint Petersburg Mint in 1790.

=== George XII ===
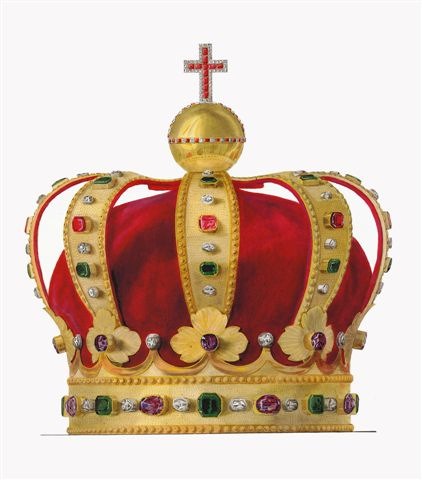
The Georgian Crown, the lost jewel of King George XII. A 19th-century painting by Fedor Solntsev from the Moscow Kremlin Museum.

George XII, Heraclius II's son and successor, received new regalia from the tsar Paul I of Russia once he filed—as demanded by Paul in his congratulatory letter of 23 August 1798—a formal request for the recognition as a new king in November 1798. The new jewels—a crown, scepter, and sword—were promptly manufactured by the artist Pierre Etienne Theremin and the goldsmith Nathanael Gottlob Licht in St. Petersburg and presented to the Georgian king at a solemn ceremony in Tiflis. After the death of George XII on 28 December 1800, the Imperial manifesto of Paul I of 18 January 1801 and that of his successor, Alexander I, of 12 September 1801, annexed Georgia to the Russian Empire. On 20 February 1801, the Russian military escorted the royal regalia from Tiflis to St. Petersburg.

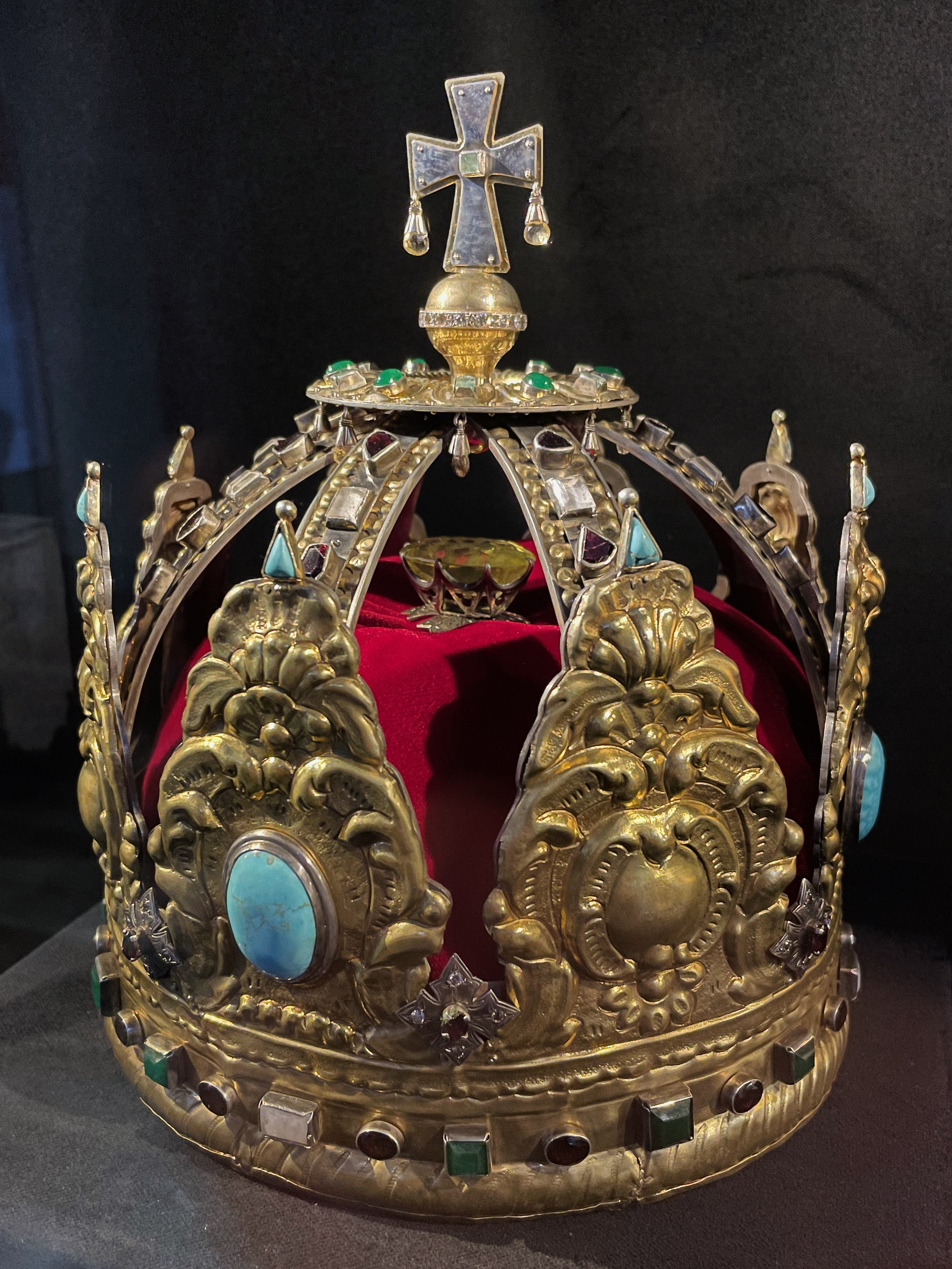
Ceremonial crown of the Georgian high nobility, which shared some features with the crown of George II but managed to survive Soviet rule

In 1811, Alexander I had these items deposited as part of the Russian sovereign's regalia in the Kremlin's Armoury, where they remained kept until after the Russian Revolution of 1917. In the Russian imperial heraldry, the Georgian Crown (Russian: Грузинская корона) was depicted on the coat of arms of Tiflis as well as on that of the titular Kingdom of Georgia as part of the Greater Arms of the Russian Empire of 1882. The Georgian Crown was made of gold, a circlet surmounted by ornaments and closed by eight half-arches on which rested a globe surmounted by a cross. It was adorned with 145 diamonds, 58 rubies, 24 emeralds, and 16 amethysts.

In 1922, the Soviet Russian Central Executive Committee decided to return the Georgian Crown as well as some of the antiquities of Georgian provenance from the Russian museums to the newly sovietized republic of Georgia. On 6 February 1923, the crown was sent to Georgia, where it was kept at the State Museum. On 23 April 1930, however, the Soviet Georgian authorities decided to "utilize" the crown. It might have been sent back to Moscow in compliance with the request from the central Soviet government and subsequently broken up. According to a more recent research by the Georgian art historian Natalia Beruchashvili, the crown might have been sold abroad and, eventually, acquired by Henri Deterding, the then-head of the Royal Dutch Shell. After Deterding's death in 1939, the crown became unheard of, but it may remain in a private collection in Europe. The heraldic depiction of the Georgian Crown ("Iberian Crown") is in use in the current coat of arms of Georgia, adopted in 2004.

Of the remaining Georgian regalia, the bulat steel sword, adorned with various gems, was lost without any trace after the 1917 revolution. Only George XII's scepter survived in the collection of the Kremlin's Armoury owing to an erroneous assumption—on account of its depiction of a Russian double-headed eagle—that it belonged to the tsar Paul I himself.

== See also ==
- Style of the Georgian sovereign
- Monarchism in Georgia
