= Sumbat I of Iberia =

Sumbat I
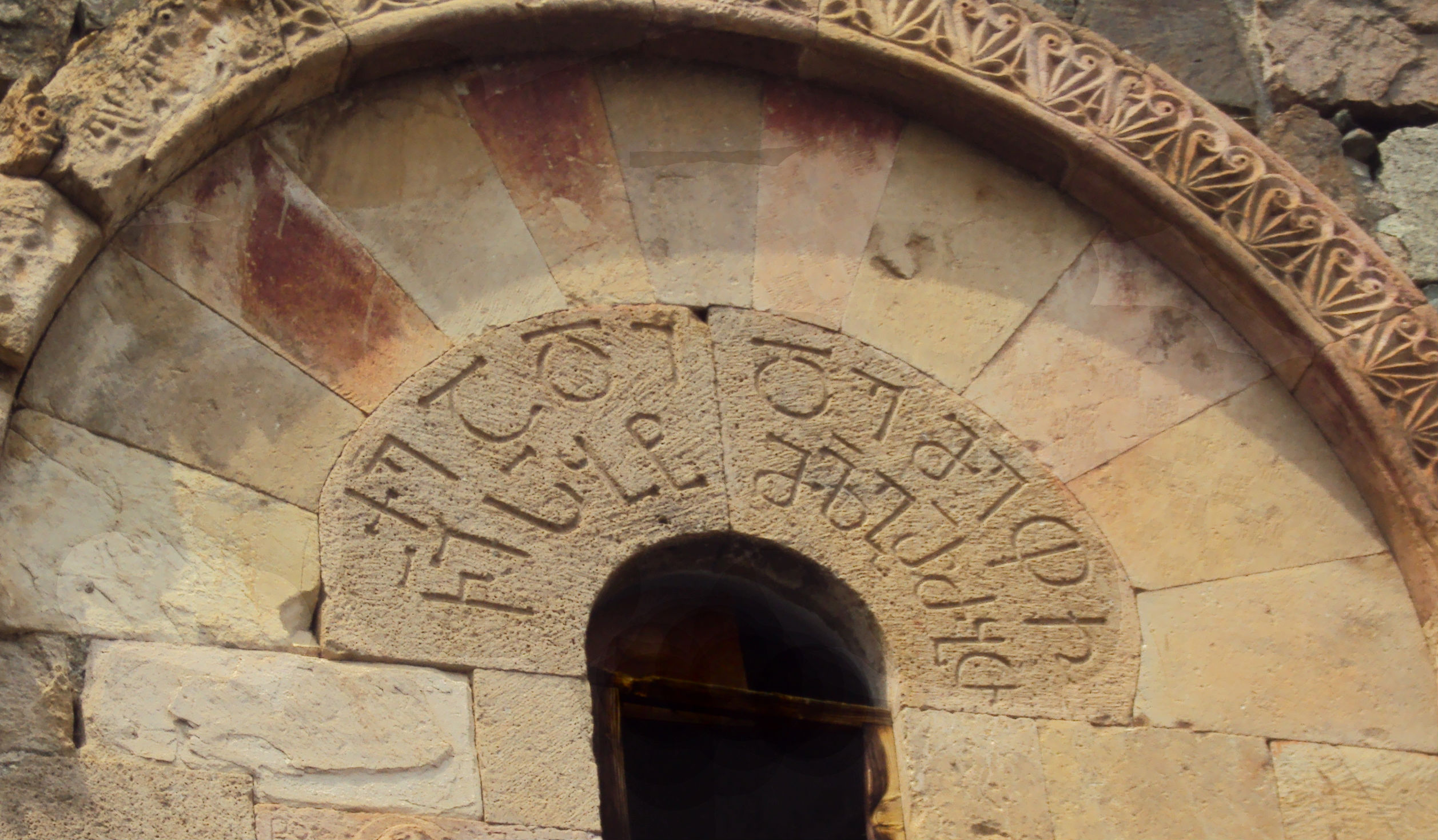
- Doliskana inscriptions mentioning Sumbat.

King of the Iberians
- Reign: 937–958
- Predecessor: David II
- Successor: Bagrat II
- Died: 958
- Issue: Bagrat II of Iberia; Adarnase V
- Dynasty: Bagrationi dynasty
- Father: Adarnase IV of Iberia
- Religion: Georgian Orthodox Church

Sumbat I (Georgian: სუმბატ I) (died 958) was a Georgian prince of the Bagrationi dynasty of Tao-Klarjeti, hereditary ruler of Lower Tao and the titular king (mepe) of Iberia from 937 until his death.

== Biography ==
Sumbat was probably the fourth and last son of the first King of the Iberians, Adarnase IV. Information about his life has not survived and, for various reasons, it was Sumbat who succeeded his elder brother David II as King of the Iberians when the latter died childless, although his other two brothers were still alive at the time.

However, the position of King of the Iberians was little more than a de jure title. Since the reign of Adarnase IV, the powerful neighbouring Kingdom of Abkhazia had extended its influence into Inner Georgia and even reduced the local kings to the status of vassals. This made King Sumbat a vassal of George II of Abkhazia, who had to submit to the orders of the Abkhazian viceroy of Iberia, Leon. It was under his reign that Iberia went to war against Kakheti on several occasions during campaigns that failed to produce any decisive results; however, there is no evidence of Sumbat's involvement in these battles.

In fact, Sumbat's reign is considered insignificant despite its 21-year duration. In her Chroniques géorgiennes, Marie-Félicité Brosset only says of the monarch that "he also only passed into history", like his predecessor and successor. It is likely that Sumbat of Iberia received the Byzantine dignity of Kouropalates and the duchy of Lower Tao in 954, following the death of his brother Ashot II of Tao. However, he was unable to hold this position for very long, dying in 958, leaving his throne to his eldest son Bagrat II.

Sumbat is commemorated in the church inscriptions from Ishkhani and Doliskana in what is now Artvin Province, Turkey.

== Bibliography ==
- Brosset, Marie-Félicité (1849). Histoire de la Géorgie depuis l'Antiquité jusqu'au XIXe siècle. Volume I [History of Georgia from Ancient Times to the 19th Century, Volume 1] (in French). Saint-Petersburg: Imperial Academy of Sciences.
  Preceded by David II	King of Iberia; 937–958	Succeeded by Bagrat II
