= Sumbat Davitis Dze =

Georgian chronicler

Sumbat Davitis Dze (Georgian: სუმბატ დავითის ძე), or Sumbat, son of David, in modern English transliteration, was the 11th-century Georgian chronicler who described in his The Life and Tale of the Bagratids the history of the Bagrationi dynasty of Georgia from the beginnings until c. 1030. The Georgian scholar Ekvtime Takaishvili has demonstrated that Sumbat belonged to that dynasty. The author is notable for his articulation of the Bagratid claim to be descended from the biblical King-Prophet David.
