= Doliskana =

Orthodox Christian monastery and mosque in Turkey

Coordinates: 41°09′57″N 41°57′08″E

Doliskana Monastery
- დოლისყანის მონასტერი
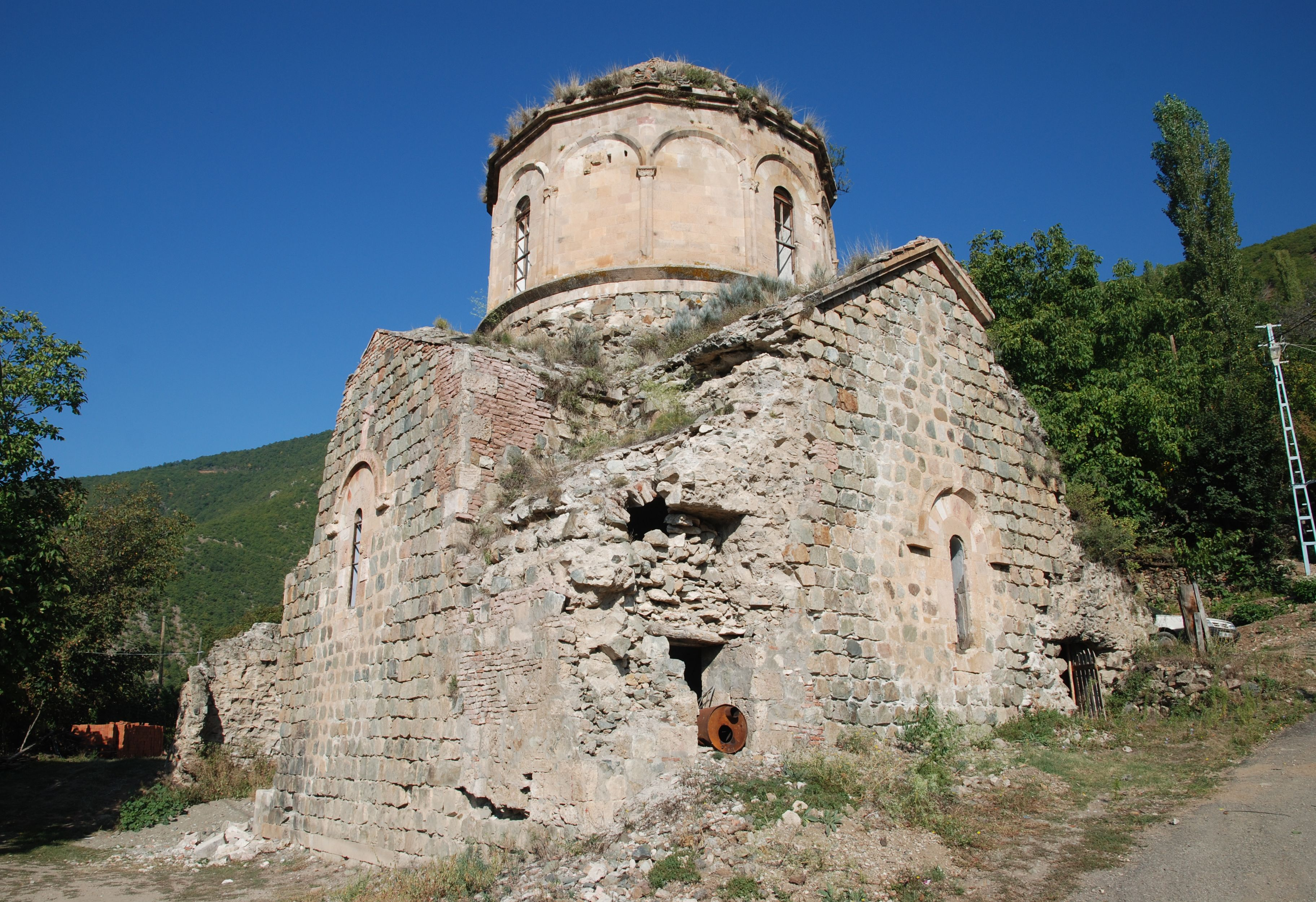

Religion
- Affiliation: Georgian Orthodox

Location
- Location: Province of Artvin, Northeast Turkey (historic Georgian principality of Klarjeti)
- Interactive map of Doliskana Monastery

Architecture
- Type: Monastery, Church
- Completed: tenth century

Doliskana (Georgian: დოლისყანა, Turkish: Dolishane) is a medieval Georgian Orthodox monastery in the Medieval Georgian kingdom of Klarjeti (modern-day Artvin Province of Turkey). It was used as a mosque, now abandoned. Its construction was finished in the mid-10th century, during the rule of Sumbat I of Iberia. It is located high above the right bank of the Imerkhevi River.

== History ==
Doliskana, as a settlement, also predated the construction of the monastery. According to the son of Sumbat, David, in January 826, the army of Ashot Kurapalat was stationed in the territory of Doliskana when he was suddenly killed by enemies. The monastery has stood here since the 10th century, although the exact date of its foundation is undetermined and several versions exist.

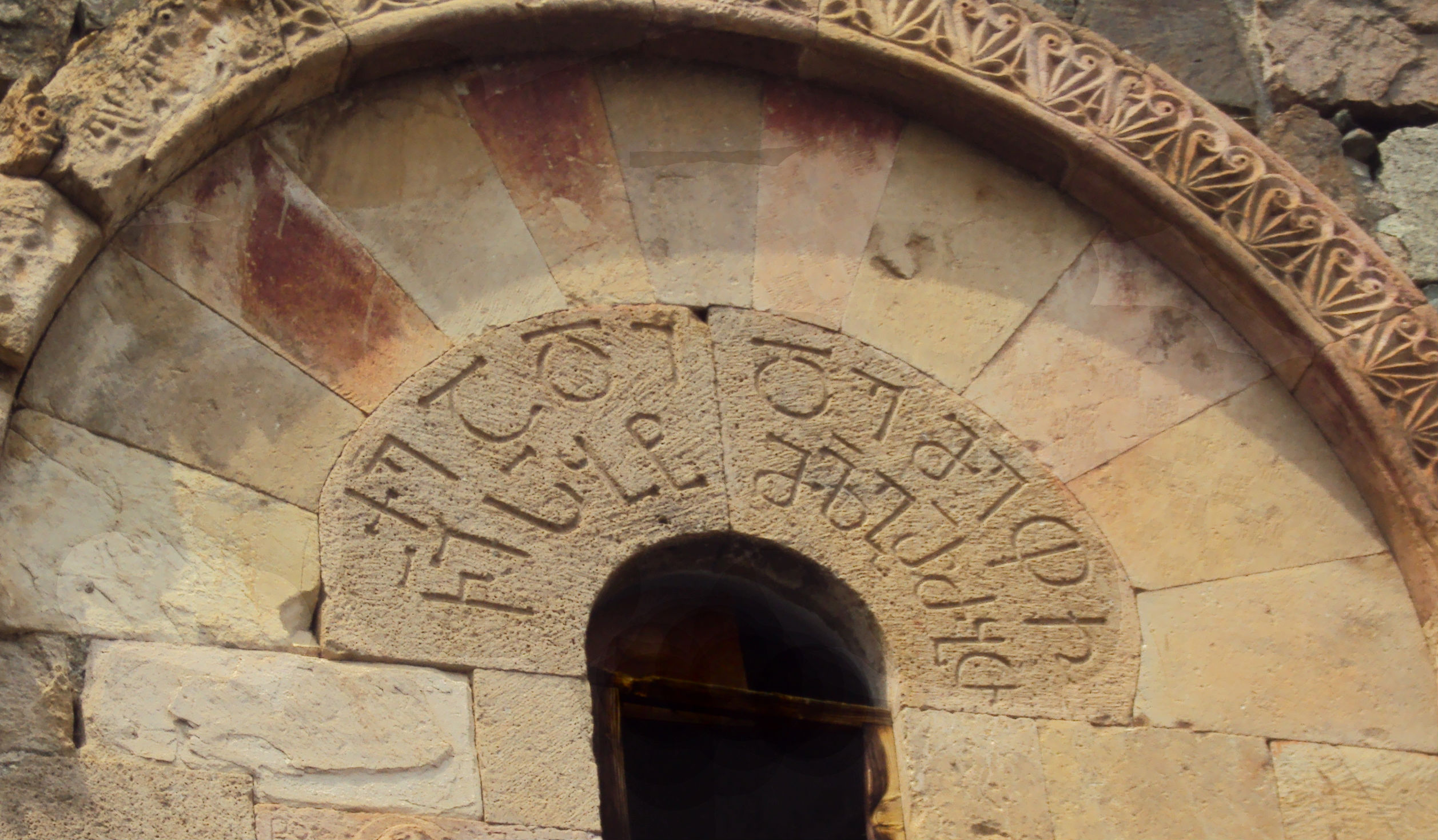
Inscription on the window of the south arm, mentioning King Sumbat

== The inscriptions ==
On the exterior walls of the church are several short inscriptions in Georgian Asomtavruli script. One mentions the prince and titular king Sumbat I of Iberia. The inscriptions have been dated to the first half of the 10th century.

== Bibliography ==
- Marr, Nicholas, The Diary of travel in Shavsheti and Klarjeti, St. Petersburg, 1911
- Djobadze, Wachtang, Early medieval Georgian monasteries in historical Tao, Klarjeti and Shavsheti, 2007
- Shoshiashvili, N. Lapidary Inscriptions, I, Tbilisi, 1980
