= Giorgi Merchule =

10th-century Georgian monk

Giorgi Merchule (Georgian: გიორგი მერჩულე) was a 10th-century Georgian monk, calligrapher and writer who authored The Vita of Grigol Khandzteli, a hagiographic novel dealing with the life of the prominent Georgian churchman St. Grigol Khandzteli (Gregory of Khandzta) (759-861).

Giorgi was a monk at the Georgian Orthodox monastery of Khandzta in Tao in what is now northeast Turkey. "Merchule" is not the surname of the author but rather an epithet loosely translated as "specialist in canon law" or perhaps "theologian" as posited by the Georgian literary scholar Pavle Ingoroqva. Giorgi's wide knowledge of contemporary canon and patristic literature is indeed evidenced by his work.

"The Vita of Grigol Khandzteli" was composed by Merchule in 951, ninety years after the death of its subject, and was somewhat expanded by the Bagratid prince Bagrat between 958 and 966. The work fell into oblivion until 1845 when the Georgian scholar Niko Chubinashvili came across an 11th-century copy of Merchule’s text at the library of the Eastern Orthodox Patriarchate of Jerusalem. Nicholas Marr examined the manuscript in 1902 and published a scholarly edition in 1911 (Тексты и разыскания по армяно-грузинской филологии, VII, СПб., 1911). Since then, The Vita has undergone several critical editions, and in abridged and annotated form, it has become an essential component of the Old Georgian literature course taught in schools. Paul Peeters translated the work in Latin in 1923 and David Marshall Lang published a paraphrased English version in 1956.

Merchule's eloquent and imaginative prose is unsurpassed in Georgian hagiography. His work is not a traditional formal account of the saint’s life, but rather shows a characteristic interest in the surrounding world. Merchule widened the range of patristic Georgian narrative to cover intimate details, rhetorical pleas and historical facts. Yet the popularity of The Vita does not stem from its literary merits alone. Written in the crucial period when the resurgent Bagratid dynasty, in close alliance with the church, mounted a struggle, ultimately successful, for the unification of Georgian lands, the work articulates the idea of all-Georgian unity and autocephaly of the Georgian church. In one of the most-quoted passages of medieval Georgian literature, Merchule advances a definition of Kartli (a core ethnic and political unit that formed a basis for Georgian unification) based upon religious and linguistic considerations:

არამედ ქართლად ფრიადი ქუეყანაჲ აღირაცხების, რომელსაცა შინა ქართულითა ენითა ჟამი შეიწირვის და ლოცვაჲ ყოველი აღესრულების ხოლო კჳრიელეჲსონი ბერძნულად ითქუმის, რომელ არს ქართულად: "უფალო, წყალობა ყავ," გინა თუ "უფალო, შეგჳიწყალენ." And Kartli consists of that spacious land in which the liturgy and all prayers are said in the Georgian language. But [only] the Kyrie eleison is said in Greek, [the phrase] which means in Georgian "Lord, have mercy" or "Lord, be merciful to us."

— translated by Donald Rayfield; Rapp (2003), p. 437.

The Vita is also notable for its allusion to the Bagratids' Davidic origin. This is the first reference to the Bagratid familial legend of the descent from the biblical David found in Georgian literary sources. Merchule himself, like the subject of his hagiography, energetically supports cooperation between the monarchy and the church, asserting that "where there is the honor of power, there is the likeness of God" (სადა არს პატივი მთავრობისაჲ, მუნ არს მსგავსებაჲ ღმრთეებისაჲ).

Merchule might also have been engaged in hymnography as indicated by a postscript in the manuscript of collection by the 10th-century hymnist Michel Modrekili.
