= Gregory of Khandzta =

Saint Gregory of Khandzta
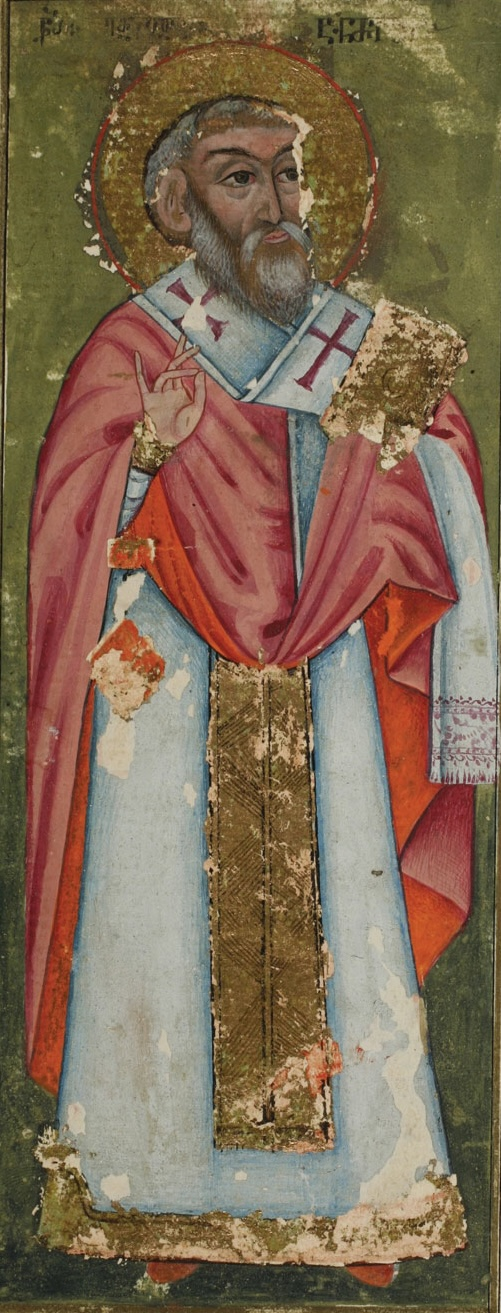

Venerable
- Born: 5 October 759; Kartli, Principality of Iberia
- Died: 18 October 861; Khandzta, Kingdom of the Iberians
- Venerated in: Eastern Orthodox Church
- Feast: October 18
- Patronage: Georgia

Gregory of Khandzta (Georgian: გრიგოლ ხანძთელი, romanized: grigol khandzteli; 5 October 759 – 18 October 861) was a Georgian monk, ecclesiastical leader, and cultural figure in the historical region of Tao‑Klarjeti. He is regarded as a central figure in the revival of Georgian monasticism and the establishment of numerous monasteries that became centres of learning, manuscript production, and spiritual life.

== Biography ==
Gregory was born into an aristocratic family in Kartli and was the nephew of the wife of the Eristavi of Kartli, Nerse. He was raised at the noble household where he received a broad education, including ecclesiastical sciences, liturgical chant, Georgian literature, philosophy, and foreign languages. Despite his family’s intentions to prepare him for the priesthood and episcopal office, Gregory chose the ascetic life. He fled with his cousin Savva, later Bishop of Ishkhani, and two companions to the Opiza Monastery, joining the monastic community there.

After two years at Opiza, Gregory moved to the Khandzta region and lived with the hermit Evodius. Around 782, he and his disciples built a church, refectory, and monastic cells at the site of what became the Khandzta Monastery. The local feudal lord Gabriel Dapanchuli supported their work with food, labor, and building materials. Gregory’s reputation reached Ashot I the Great, who granted him land at Shatberdi. There, he founded a monastery that became a major centre of manuscript copying and illustration, some of which survive today.

Gregory trained several disciples who went on to establish additional monasteries: Theodore founded Nedzvi Monastery, Christofor founded Kviriketsminda Monastery, and Hilarion of Jerusalem founded Ubisi Monastery. He also oversaw the establishment of the women’s monastery at Mere and contributed to the restoration of the Ishkhani and other churches. His monastic rule followed strict ascetic principles inspired by the Lavra of Saint Sabbas the Sanctified.

Gregory enjoyed the respect of both Georgian nobility and clergy. He played an influential role in the election of Arsenius I of Iberia as Catholicos of Kartli (860–887). His hagiography recounts numerous miracles, including healing the sick, calming animals, and controlling natural phenomena. Saint Gregory of Khandzta died as a centenarian in 861, surrounded by followers and disciples. The Eastern Orthodox Church marks his memory on the day of his death, October 18. His life was compiled in the hagiographic work written by Giorgi Merchule in 951.

== See also ==
- Ephrem Mtsire
