= Wachtang Djobadze =

American art historian

Wachtang Djobadze (Georgian: ვახტანგ ჯობაძე) (March 8, 1917 – February 10, 2007) was a Georgian art historian and Professor at the California State University, Los Angeles. During the Soviet Union, he lived as an émigré in the United States, and was the only Georgian scholar to have opportunity to travel to Turkey where a number of medieval Georgian churches and monasteries lay in ruins in the historical Tao-Klarjeti region and Antioch. He studied and described these monuments in several works, including Materials for the Study of Georgian Monasteries in the Western Environs of Antioch on the Orontes (1976), Archeological Investigations in the Region West of Antioch On-The-Orontes (Stuttgart : Steiner-Verlag-Wiesbaden-GmbH, 1986), Early Medieval Georgian Monasteries in Historic Tao, Klarjet'i, and Savset'i (Stuttgart : Steiner-Verlag-Wiesbaden-GmbH, 1992). In 1981, he discovered ruins of the medieval Georgian Gialia Monastery in Cyprus.

He died in Carlsbad, California, on February 10, 2007, and was buried in Tbilisi, Georgia.
