= Durgulel the Great =

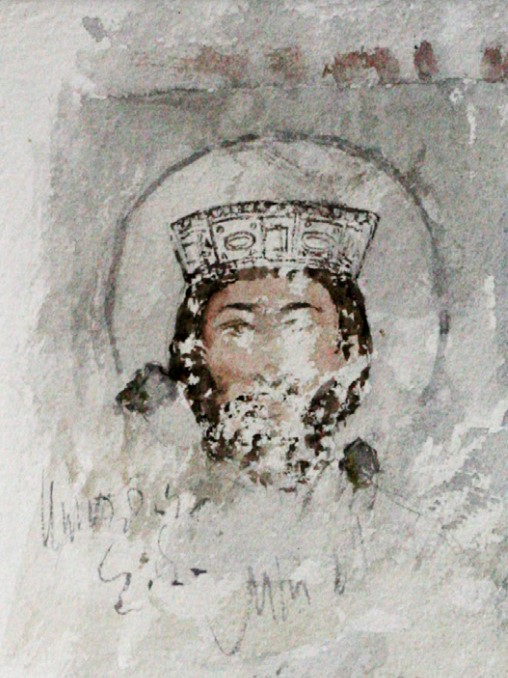
- Fresco of Durgulel

King of Alania
- Reign: c. 1053/1054 – c. 1071
- Predecessor: Gabriel of Alania
- Successor: Konstantin of Alania
- Born: Unknown; Maghas, Kingdom of Alania
- Died: 1071
- House: Tsarazon dynasty
- Father: Gabriel of Alania
- Mother: Unknown
- Religion: Eastern Orthodoxy

Durgulel the Great was the legendary ruler of Alania in the 11th century, under whom the Kingdom reached the peak of its power and economic prosperity.

== Biography ==
Durgulel was born in the early XI century. He was the son of the previous ruler of Alania, Gabriel. His sister was Borena of Alania, the second wife of the Georgian king Bagrat IV. This strengthened the allied relations between the Alans and Georgians. Under Durgulel, Alania reached its peak. In the 1060s, Durgulel led a successful campaign against Arran, Ganja, Azerbaijan.

Georgian chronicles report that after the victory at Arran, Durgulel paid a visit to Bagrat IV, he also arranged an audience for his sister Borena. After which a large feast took place in Kutaisi. After the Georgian-Seljuk Wars began, Durgulel sent 40,000 Alan warriors to help fight the Seljuks. Under his rule, Alania was also an ally of the Byzantine Empire. In 1071, Durgulel sent Alanian soldiers to help Byzantium in the Battle for Manzikert.

== 1062-1065 raids on Arran ==
Raids on Arran
Date	1062, 1065
Location	Arran (Caucasus)
Result	1st assault - Alanian victory 2nd assault - Alanian victory: Temporary capture of Arran by Alanian forces

Belligerents
Kingdom of Alania	Shaddadid dynasty

Commanders and leaders
Durgulel the Great	Abu'l-Aswar Shavur ibn Fadl

Strength
40,000 troops	Unknown

Casualties and losses
Unknown	More than 20,000 prisoners

In 1062, the Alans passed through the Darial Gorge, capturing more than 20,000 prisoners. In 1063, the Emir of Ganja built a strong wall in case of a second invasion, but it did not help. In 1065, the Alans invaded Arran, reaching the Aras river. More than 200 fighters died in battles near the wall near Ganja.

== Genealogy ==
Durgulel came from the royal family of Alania Tsarazon. Durgulel was the grandson of the legendary Alan ruler who united Alania into a single whole - Urdure. His father was Gabriel, and his sisters were Borena of Alania and Alda of Alania. The name of his mother is unknown.
