= Mariam (daughter of Bagrat IV of Georgia) =

Daughter of Georgian king (11th-century)

Mariam (Georgian: მარიამი) was a daughter of King Bagrat IV of Georgia (r. 1027–1072) by his Alan wife Borena. She was possibly married, as the second wife, to the Byzantine dignitary Theodore Gabras.

Mariam was mentioned in the Georgian annals on one occasion only as being present at the deathbed of her father Bagrat IV in November 1072. The name Mariam (Maria) was also borne—as a Byzantine empress—by Bagrat's other, better-documented daughter who was born as Martha in Georgia.

Professor Cyril Toumanoff, a student of the medieval Caucasian genealogies, identifies Mariam with the anonymous "Alan" woman of "very good birth" known from Anna Komnene's Alexiad to have married, as his second wife, the Byzantine nobleman Theodore Gabras, dux of Trebizond in 1091. This lady was a cousin of Eirene, another bride from Georgia at the Byzantine court, who was married to the sebastokrator Isaac Komnenos, brother of the emperor Alexios I Komnenos. Eirene was mother of the fiancée of Gregory Gabras, Theodore's son of his first marriage. Thus, Gregory's engagement with a Komnenid princess was quietly broken off as they were now considered close relatives and according to civil and the ecclesiastical laws, such marriages were forbidden. Alexios, however, was worried about Theodore's reaction, so he kept Gregory at the court as a hostage in order to ensure Theodore's continued good behavior, reassuring Theodore with the claim that he was contemplating marrying Gregory to one of his own daughters. Theodore's subsequent attempt at abducting his son brought the Gabrades in conflict with Constantinople. No further details are known about Theodore's wife.
