= Byzantine–Georgian treaty of 1031 =

1031 treaty between Georgia and the Byzantine Empire

Treaty of 1031
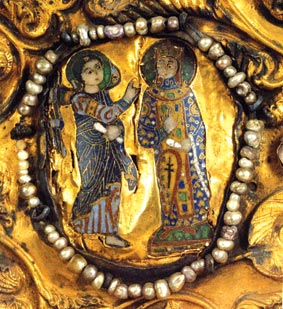
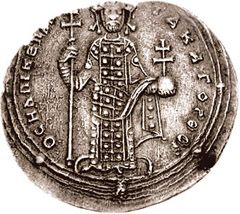
The treaty was concluded between the rulers of Kingdom of Georgia, Queen Mariam (left) and the Byzantine Empire, Emperor Romanos III (right).

The Treaty of 1031 was concluded between Kingdom of Georgia and the Byzantine Empire. It was signed by the Queen regent of Georgia, Mariam of Vaspurakan, and the Byzantine Emperor Romanos III Argyros.

In 1031, the Georgian queen Mariam visited Constantinople and negotiated a peace treaty with Emperor Romanos on behalf of her underage son Bagrat IV, on the following terms:

- the marriage of Helena Argyre to King Bagrat IV
- award of the title of kouropalates to of King Bagrat IV.

Helena was a daughter of the magistros Basil Argyros and, thus a niece of the Emperor The marriage of Helena to King Bagrat, then aged around 14, was arranged as part of the peace deal negotiated, which brought an outbreak of Byzantine–Georgian hostilities to an end.
