= Borena of Alania =

Queen of Georgia from 1027 to 1072

Borena
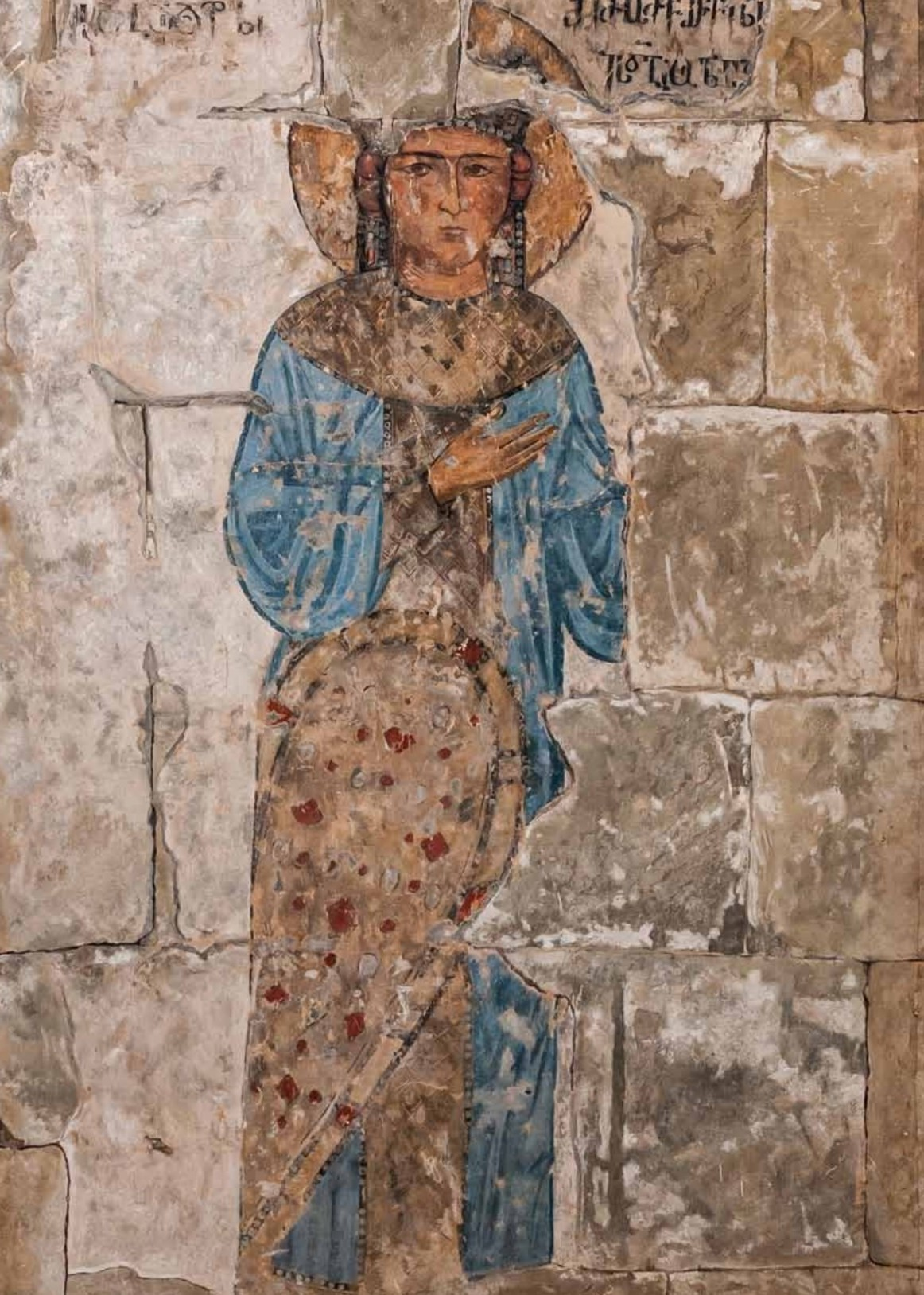
- Fresco of Queen Borena, Ateni Sioni Church.
- Spouse: Bagrat IV of Georgia
- Issue: George II of Georgia; Maria of Alania; Mariam

Borena (Georgian: ბორენა) was a sister of the Alan king Durgulel the Great, and the queen consort of Georgia, as the second wife of Bagrat IV (r. 1027–1072).

== Biography ==
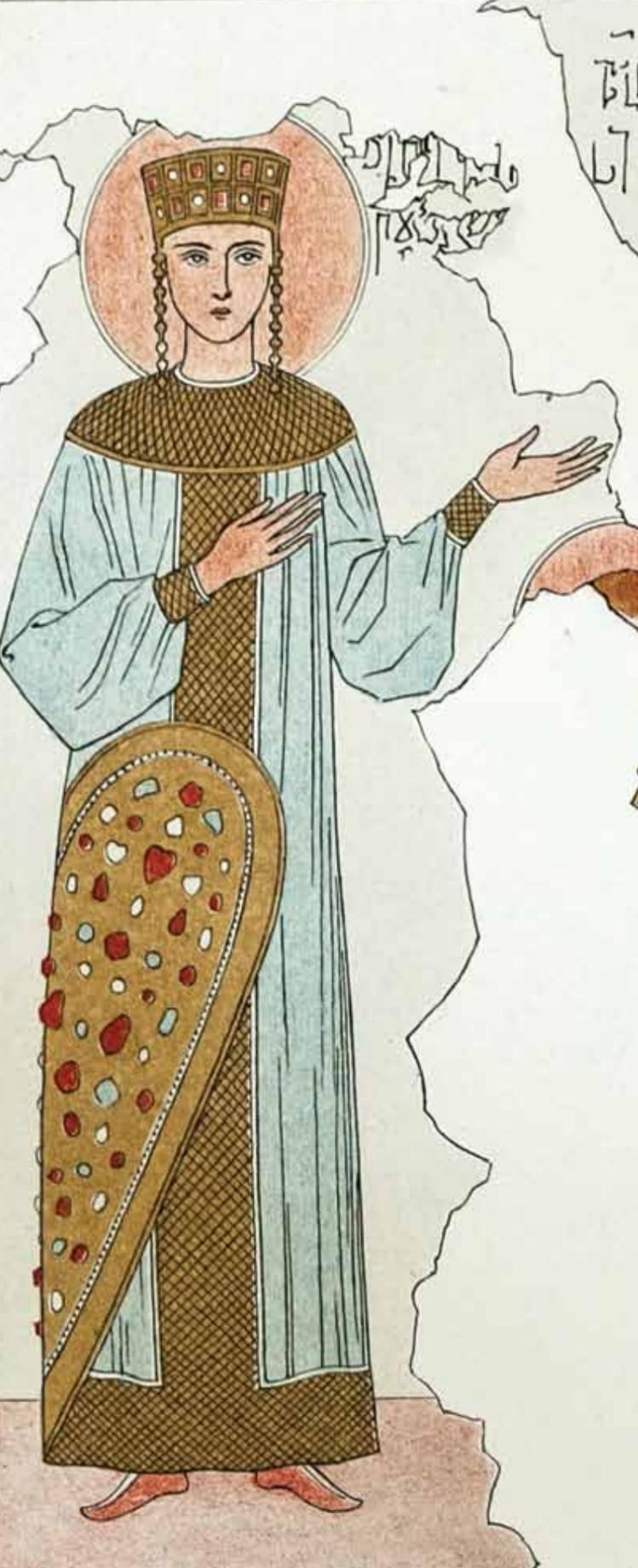
Queen Borena, copy by Grigory Gagarin.

The medieval Georgian historical tradition provides little information about Borena. Bagrat married Borena sometime after the death of his first wife in the early 1030s, Elene (niece of the Byzantine Emperor Romanos III Argyros). The births of their children in the 1050s is a clue that their marriage was in the 1040s or early 1050s. This was just one of the several intermarriages between the medieval Georgian Bagratids and their natural allies, the royal house of Alania. Borena seems to have retained some contacts with her native Alania: the Georgian chronicles report that when Durgulel paid a visit to Bagrat IV, he also arranged an audience with his sister Borena. The last we hear about Borena is her presence at Bagrat's deathbed in 1072.

Borena is primarily known as a patron and promoter of Georgian Orthodox culture and monastic life. She sponsored the construction of the Georgian Kapata Monastery on Mount Sion at Jerusalem. She is frequently identified with the Borena who was an author of a passionate and moving hymn to Virgin Mary, which is found as an inscription on the Theotokos icon from that time (now preserved at the Lenjer Church in highland Svaneti).

Bagrat IV and Borena were the parents of:

- George II of Georgia, Bagrat's successor to the throne of Georgia
- Martha-Maria, Queen consort of the Byzantine Empire

In addition to these well-documented children, the couple may have had a daughter, Mariam, possibly a wife of the Byzantine dignitary Theodore Gabras.

Royal titles
Preceded by Elene	Queen consort of Georgia c. 1034/40–1072	Succeeded by Elene
