= Gurandukht (daughter of George I of Georgia) =

Gurandukht (Georgian: გურანდუხტი) (died before 1072) was a daughter of King George I of Georgia by his first wife Mariam. She was active in the politics of Georgia during the reign of her brother Bagrat IV.

== Biography ==
During Bagrat's exile at the Byzantine court enforced by the rebellion of Liparit IV of Kldekari, in the 1050s, Gurandukht was "protector" (patroni) of Bagrat's young son George II, who was declared king in Bagrat's absence at Constantinople. It was she who demanded that the Emperor Constantine IX Monomachos return Bagrat to Georgia. Gurandukht then took part in the restoration of Bagrat's authority in Georgia following the downfall of Liparit.

According to the Chronicle of Kartli, part of the Georgian Chronicles, Gurandukht was married to Smbat, brother of Kiurike II, an Armenian king of Lori. Their unnamed daughter was intended by Bagrat to marry the Seljuk Sultan Alp Arslan as part of a peace deal after the sultan's Georgian campaign in 1064, but he failed to obtain consent from his Armenian in-law Kiurike. In the ensuing conflict, Kiurike was captured by Bagrat's agents and forced into submission of the fortress of Samshvilde to the king of Georgia. Gurandukht's daughter was eventually given in marriage to Alp Arslan, but later became the wife of the influential Seljuk vizier and scholar Nizam al-Mulk, with whom she had the son Ahmad ibn Nizam al-Mulk, the future vizier. The circumstances in which she came into Nizam's harem are obscure.
