= Byzantine–Georgian treaty =

Byzantine–Georgian treaty may refer to:

- Byzantine–Georgian treaty of 1022
- Byzantine–Georgian treaty of 1031
