= Garsevanishvili =

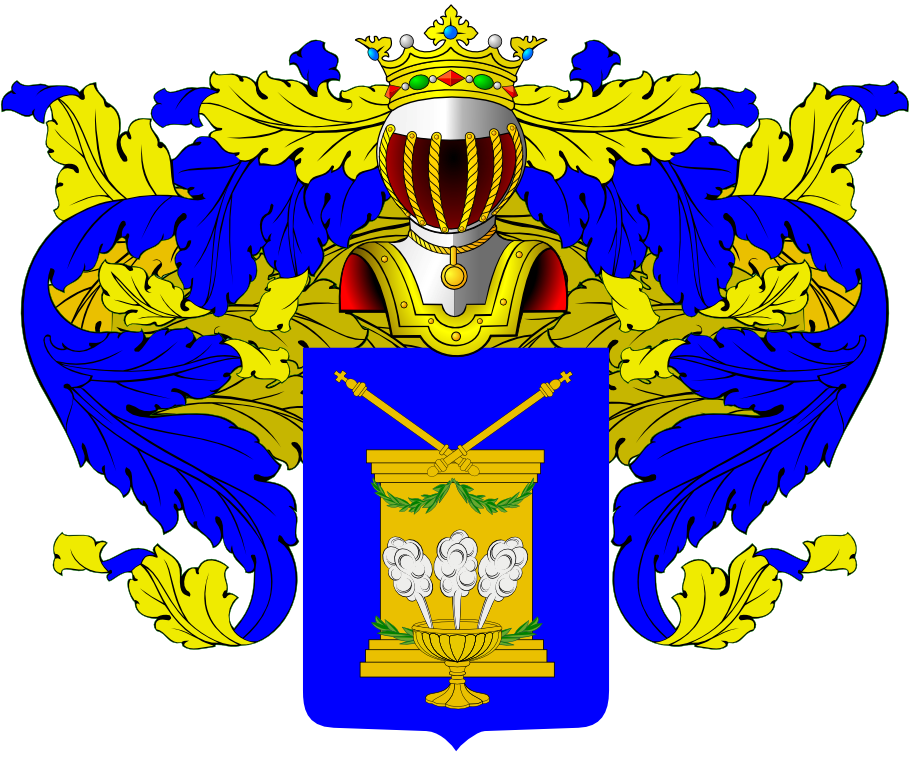
Garsevanishvili family coat of arms.

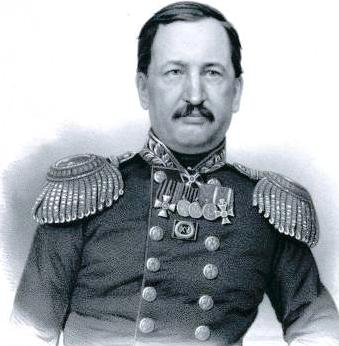
Nikolai Borisovich Gersevanishvili, Major-General

The Garsevanishvili (Georgian: გარსევანიშვილი), also known as Gersevanov (Russian: Герсеванов), is a Georgian noble Baronial family (aznauri) active in both Georgia and Russia.

== History ==
The family came to prominence in the early 18th century at the court of the Georgian king Vakhtang VI. A family legend traces their origin to Greek choristers who accompanied the Byzantine princess Helena Argyre into Georgia upon her marriage to King Bagrat IV in the 11th century. Members of the family were privileged to serve as archpriests at the Georgian court and as hereditary keepers of the Okona Icon of the Mother of God. Garsevanishvili family was included in the list of nobles of Georgia in 1860 in the so-called "Barkhatnaia Kniga" published in Saint Petersburg.

They followed Vakhtang VI in his Russian exile in 1724 and entered the Russian service, adopting the surname of Gersevanov (Garsevanov). They were granted estates in the governorates of Poltava, Kharkov and Yekaterinoslav. Those who remained in Georgia were reconfirmed among the nobility by a charter of King Erekle II in 1788.

The notable members of the family were also Mikhail Nikolayevich Gersevanov (1830–1907), an engineer who supervised numerous road-building projects in the Caucasus; and his son Nikolay (1879–1950), also an engineer specializing in ground mechanics.
