= Theodore Gabras =

11th-century Byzantine military leader and martyr

- Dux of Chaldia; Ruler of Trebizond
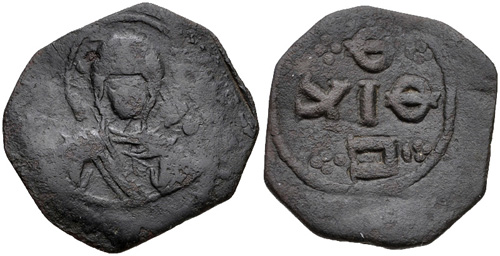
- Copper follis minted at Trebizond under Theodore Gabras
- Reign: c. 1080-1099
- Successor: Constantine Gabras
- Died: 2 October 1099; Erzurum
- Issue: Constantine Gabras; Gregory Gabras

Theodore Gabras (Greek: Θεόδωρος Γαβρᾶς) was a Byzantine governor in the Pontus who was involved in a minor unsuccessful rebellion against the Emperor Alexios I Komnenos around the year 1091.

He is an Eastern Orthodox neomartyr whose feast day is celebrated on 2 October.

== Early life ==
Theodore originally hailed from the Theme of Chaldia, and spent most of his adult life serving in the Byzantine army. A violent and energetic man, he had gained considerable fame as a gifted soldier, both courageous and cunning, with an outstanding record of success. It was reported that he rarely failed in any military task, and invariably got the better of his enemies. Already by 1067, when he commissioned a gospel preserved in St Petersburg, he had risen to the ranks of patrikios, topoteretes and hypatos. He achieved his crowning glory in the 1080s, recapturing Trebizond from the Seljuk Turks and ruling it for a time as his own personal fiefdom.

By the late 1080s, Theodore was once again residing at Constantinople, where Alexios I was keeping a concerned eye on him. In order to avoid any unnecessary temptations, he formally appointed Theodore Dux of Trebizond and ordered him to take up his post. Leaving his eldest son Gregory at the court with the sebastokrator Isaac Komnenos, to whose daughter Gregory was engaged, he returned to Trebizond.

Soon afterwards his first wife died, so Theodore married, apparently in 1091, a "most noble" lady from "Alania", and the first cousin of Isaac Komnenos's wife. According to Professor Cyril Toumanoff, the lady was the Georgian Bagratid princess Mariam, daughter of the Georgian king Bagrat IV and sister of the Byzantine princess Maria. When this became known, the engagement between Gregory and the Komnenos daughter was broken off, as they were now considered close relatives and their marriage was prohibited by civil and ecclesiastic law. Alexios however was worried about Theodore's reaction, so he kept Gregory at the court as a hostage in order to ensure Theodore's continued good behavior.

== Defiance against Alexios I ==
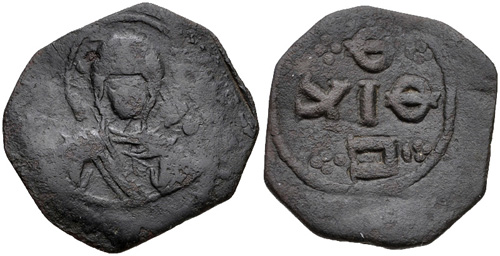
Copper follis minted at Trebizond under Theodore Gabras

By 1091, Theodore had returned to the capital and was demanding the return of his son. Alexios refused, claiming he was contemplating marrying the boy to one of his own daughters. Disbelieving the emperor, Theodore hatched a plot to rescue his son and get him to safety at Trebizond in secret. He initially agreed to hand over his son; then on the eve of his departure he had dinner with the Sebastokrator, with whom he was now related through his second marriage. He begged to be allowed a further twenty-four hours with his son, which Isaac agreed to. The next day, he asked if Gregory could accompany him on the first stage of his journey to Sosthenium, where he intended to pitch his camp. His minders agreed, but when Theodore then proposed that Gregory accompany him further, they initially said no before Theodore managed to convince them. They made it to the port of Pharus when Theodore secretly boarded a merchant ship along with Gregory and fled onto the Euxine.

This act of rebellion stirred Alexios into action, and he sent a squadron of ships to overtake Theodore with orders to bring Gregory back to the capital no matter what. They overtook the ship near the town of Aeginus and advised Theodore that were he to refuse to hand over his son, he would be arrested as a rebel. Theodore, still distant from his seat of power and outnumbered, backed down and allowed Alexios’ emissaries to take Gregory back with them, while he continued on his way back to Trebizond. Gregory then formed another plot to escape but it too was discovered and he was imprisoned at Philippopolis for his troubles.

== Career after 1091 ==
A man of Theodore's military talents was too good to waste, and by 1097 he was once again at the front line, this time fighting the Turks as part of the initial alliance with the Crusaders. While the Franks were engaged at the Siege of Antioch, Theodore was marching with Alexios and helping him recapture towns in western Asia Minor. He was prominent in the capture of Paipert, which was subsequently besieged by the Turks who hoped to reclaim it. Turning around, Theodore contemplated a night attack against the enemy, but changed his mind. In 1098 or 1099 during a campaign in the region of Theodosioupolis, he was captured by the Danishmendid Emir Ali, who tried to convert Gabras to Islam by force. After Gabras refused, Ali ordered that he be tortured: his tongue was cut, his eyes were gouged out, his head was scalped and his body was torn apart. Amri then made his skull into a golden drinking cup and burnt all that was left.

His younger son, Constantine Gabras, succeeded him as dux of Chaldia, and around 1115-1140 he managed to retrieve his father's skull, which was transported to Trebizond and became the product of worship. The feast day of Saint Theodoros Gabras is on 2 October.

== Sources ==
- Anna Comnena, The Alexiad, translated E.R.A. Sewter, Penguin Classics, 1969
- George Finlay, History of the Byzantine and Greek Empires from 1057 - 1453, Volume 2, William Blackwood & Sons, 1854
- Kazhdan, Alexander, ed. (1991), Oxford Dictionary of Byzantium, Oxford University Press, ISBN 978-0-19-504652-6
- Treadgold, Warren (1997). A history of the Byzantine state and society. Stanford (California): Stanford University Press. ISBN 9780804726306.
- Vryonis, Speros (1971). The Decline of Medieval Hellenism in Asia Minor and the Process of Islamization from the Eleventh through the Fifteenth Century. University of California Press. ISBN 0-520-01597-5.
