= Mariam of Vaspurakan =

Queen of Georgia from 1014 to 1018

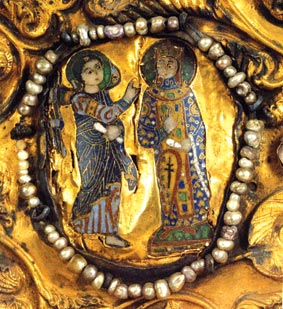
- Mariam, Dowager Queen of Georgia (a detail from the Khakhuli icon

Queen consort of Georgia
- Tenure: 1014–1018
- Born: Vaspurakan
- Died: before 1103
- Spouse: George I of Georgia
- Issue: Bagrat IV of Georgia
- Father: Senekerim-Hovhannes Artsruni
- Religion: Georgian Orthodox Church

Mariam, (Armenian: Մարիամ Վասպուրականի, Georgian: მარიამი) was a Georgian queen and regent. She was the daughter of John-Senekerim Artsruni, an Armenian king of Vaspurakan, and the first consort of the king George I of Georgia. As a dowager queen of Georgia, she ruled as regent for her underage son, Bagrat IV, from 1027 to 1037, and was involved in diplomacy with the Byzantine Empire.

== Life ==
Mariam was married to George I (r. 1014-1027) as his first wife, but seems to have been divorced by the king so that he could marry Alda, daughter of the king of Alania. Mariam returned to prominence upon the death of George and the ascension of their son, Bagrat IV, to the throne of Georgia in 1027. During Bagrat’s minority, she shared the regency with the grandees, particularly with the dukes Liparit and Ivane. In 1031/2, Mariam paid a visit to Romanos III Argyros's court at Constantinople on behalf of Bagrat, and returned with a peace treaty, the dignity of curopalates and the Byzantine bride Helena (daughter of Romanos III's brother Basil) for her son.

Mariam continued to play a prominent role in Georgia’s politics even after Bagrat assumed full reigning powers. The Georgian chronicles speak of the Armenians being her subjects because of her parentage, a possible reference to a three-month-long Georgian control of Ani before the city was finally annexed by the Byzantines in 1045, and report a disagreement between Bagrat and Mariam regarding the future of Bagrat’s half-brother Demetre, who defected to the Byzantines in 1033 handing over the fortress of Anacopia. Mariam advocated the reconciliation between the brothers and made a futile attempt at bringing the rebellious Demetre back to loyalty. During Bagrat’s enforced exile at the Byzantine court in the 1050s, Mariam accompanied her son and spent three years with him in residence at Constantinople during the reign of Constantine IX Monomachos.

Mariam was distinguished by her contributions to the Christian church and monastic foundations. She was fluent in several languages including Georgian, Greek and Armenian. Mariam is commemorated for donations to the Iviron monastery (on Mount Athos) in its Synodicon. He was known for his association with the eminent Georgian monk and scholar George the Hagiorite under whose auspices Mariam would eventually become a nun. According to the Life of George the Hagiorite, after the marriage of her granddaughter Martha-Maria to Michael VII Ducas (1065), Mariam traveled to Antioch with the intention to make a further pilgrimage to Jerusalem, carrying with her an imperial order for the governor and patriarch of Antioch. These, however, persuaded the queen to refrain from visiting the Saracen-held Jerusalem; George the Hagiorite himself took her money and distributed it among the poor and the monasteries there.

The death of Mariam is not mentioned in the chronicles; she was present at Bagrat IV’s deathbed in 1072, and was certainly dead by 1103 when she is commemorated in the record of the Georgian church council at Ruisi–Urbnisi.

Royal titles
Preceded by Mariam	Queen consort of Georgia; 1014 - c. 1018	Succeeded by Alda of Alania
