= Helena Argyre =

Queen consort of Georgia
- Tenure: c. 1032 – 1033
- Died: 1033; Kutaisi, Kingdom of Georgia
- Spouse: Bagrat IV of Georgia
- House: Argyros
- Father: Basil Argyros

Helena Argyre or Argyropoulina (Greek: Ἑλένη Ἀργυρή/Ἀργυροπούλινα, Georgian: ელენე, elene) (died c. 1033) was a Byzantine noblewoman of the Argyros family and Queen of Georgia as the first wife of King Bagrat IV of Georgia. She was given off in marriage by her uncle, the Byzantine Emperor Romanos III Argyros, to the boy-king Bagrat c. 1032. Helena died within a year or so, without issue.

== Family ==
Helena was a daughter of the magistros Basil Argyros and, thus, a niece of the emperor Romanos III Argyros. The marriage of Helena to King Bagrat, then aged around 14, was arranged as part of a peace deal negotiated, c. 1032, by Bagrat's mother and regent Mariam during her visit to Constantinople, which brought an outbreak of Byzantine–Georgian hostilities to an end. Helena's family was well known to the Georgian leaders; Queen Dowager Mariam was a daughter of the Armenian monarch John-Senekerim, the last king of Vaspurakan, who had surrendered his patrimony to the emperor Basil II. The first Byzantine governor of Vaspurakan was Basil Argyros, Helena's father.

== Marriage ==
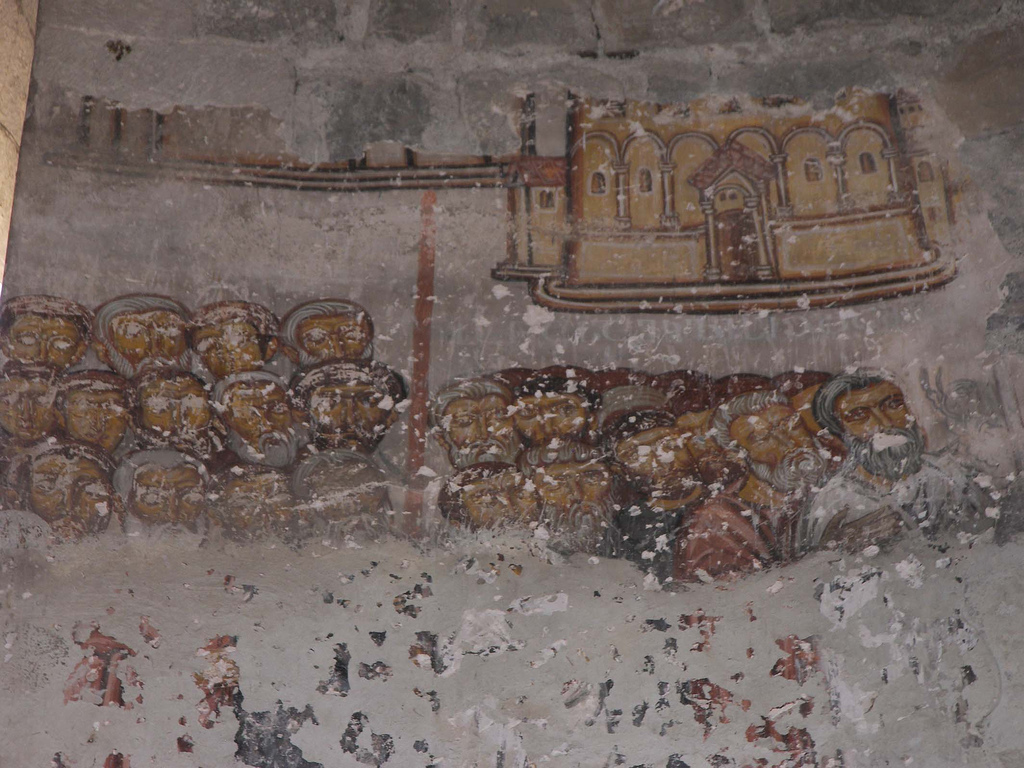
A fresco from Oshki, probably depicting the marriage of Bagrat and Helena at Bana.

Mariam returned to Georgia with the bride and the high imperial dignity of Kouropalates for his son. The marriage was celebrated at the cathedral of Bana, one of the principal royal churches of the Georgian Bagratids, which had also served as a venue for the coronation of Bagrat IV in 1027. The marriage is probably the subject of the 1036 fresco from the Oshki monastery, depicting a royal event at Bana.

According to the Georgian historical tradition, Helene brought, as part of her dowry, "one of the nails of Jesus Christ, the icon of Okona and great riches". In addition, a number of Byzantine artists and craftsmen accompanied her to Georgia. The Georgian noble family of Garsevanishvili later claimed descent from Helena's chorister and were privileged to serve as hereditary keepers of the icon of Okona. This Byzantine ivory icon of the Mother of God, after an eventful history, found its abode at the Art Museum of Georgia in Tbilisi in 2004. Helena is also credited with the embellishment of the church of Gordi in Mingrelia.

Helena died within a year or so after her marriage in the city of Kutaisi, without issue. All the children of Bagrat were born of his second marriage to the Alan princess Borena. Helena's death ended the brief rapprochement of the Georgian Bagratids and the Byzantine court and relations soon became unstable again.

== Notes ==
Royal titles
Preceded by Alda of Alania	Queen consort of Georgia c. 1032–1033	Succeeded by Borena of Alania
