= Khakhuli triptych =

Repoussé triptych icon of the Virgin Mary

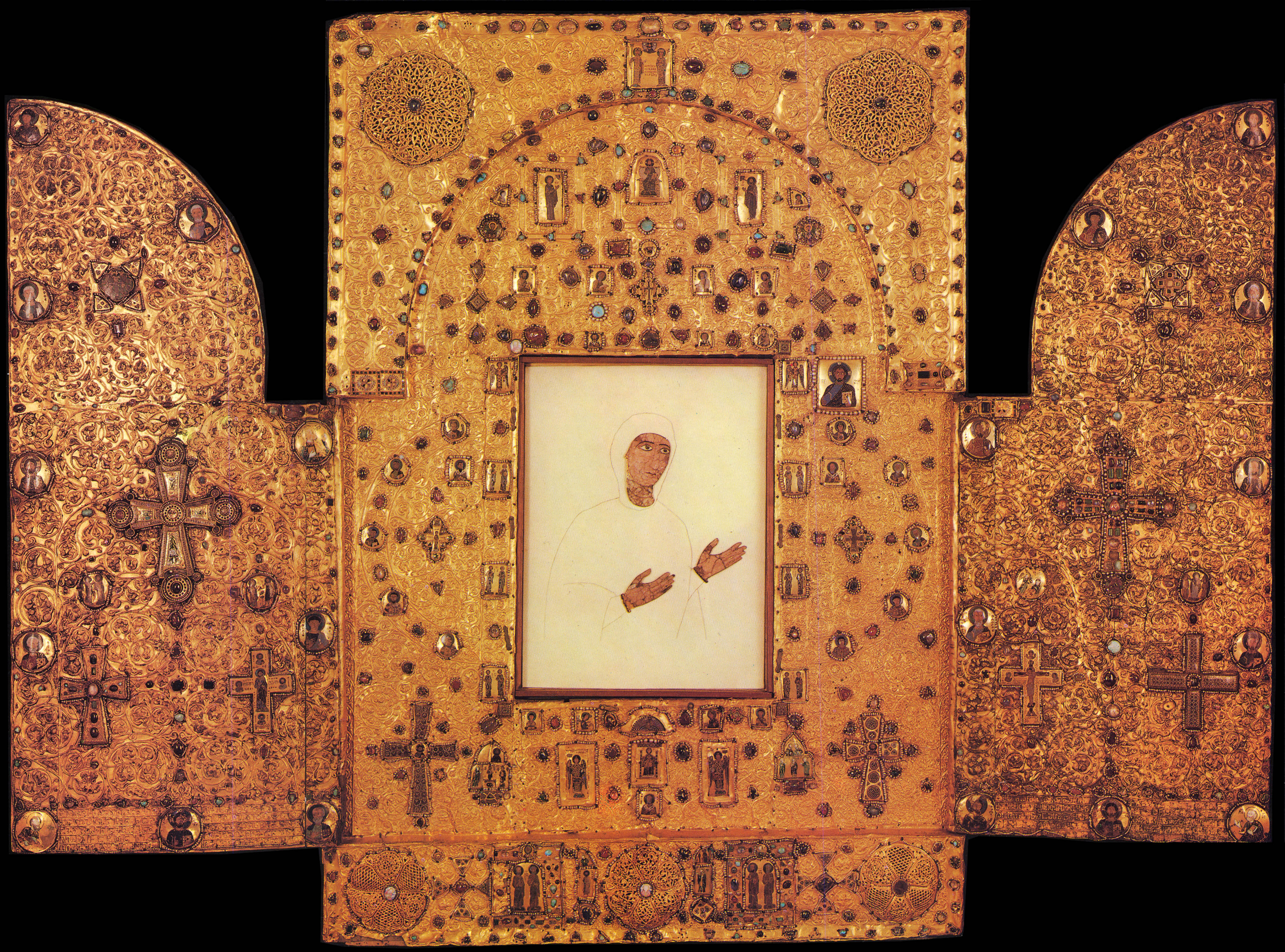
The Khakhuli triptych

The Khakhuli triptych (Georgian: ხახულის ხატი, khakhulis khati) is a partially preserved large repoussé triptych icon of the Theotokos (Virgin Mary) created in medieval Georgia. It incorporates over 100 specimens of Georgian and Byzantine cloisonné enamel dated from the 8th to the 12th century. The icon is now on display at Art Museum of Georgia in Tbilisi.

== History ==
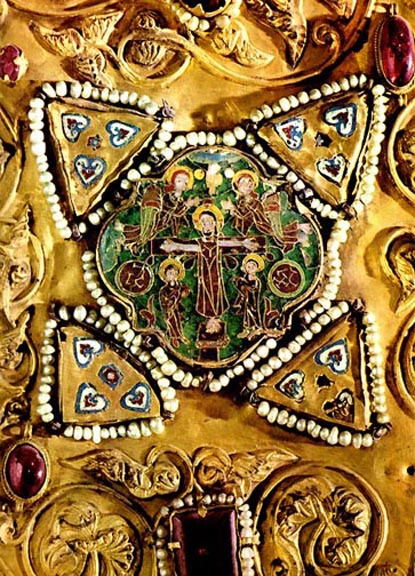
"Crucifixion" from the Khakhuli triptych

The Khakhuli triptych derives its name from the medieval Georgian Khakhuli monastery (now Haho, Turkey), where it was originally kept. Early in the 12th century, the Georgian king David the Builder donated several precious stones to the icon while his successor Demetrius I had the icon, already revered as miraculous, transferred to the Gelati monastery near Kutaisi, western Georgia, where it was further refurbished and set in a gold frame with gilded silver wings under Queen Tamar. According to the medieval Georgian chronicles, Tamar particularly honored the icon and donated to it a Caliph’s standard seized in the battle of Shamkor in 1195.

The icon was stolen from Gelati in 1859, allegedly at the instigation of the Russian governor of Kutaisi, Count Levashov^{(ru)}. Much of the gold and jewels were torn out and sold in Russia. Later, Levashov commissioned a metal reproduction from a Moscow goldsmith which was presented to the Gelati monastery in 1865. The original icon, as well as many of its medallions, subsequently entered the private collection of the Russian painter Mikhail Botkin and then the Hermitage Museum. The icon was only returned to Georgia in 1923 in a badly fragmented state.

== Description ==
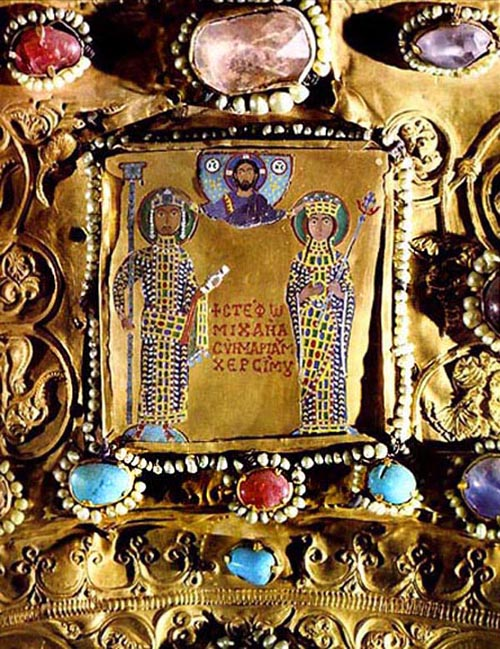
"Michael VII Doukas and Maria" from the Khakhuli triptych

The Khakhuli triptych is one of the largest enamel artworks in the world, with its height of 1.47 m and width (with unfolded panels) of 2.02 m.

The centerpiece of the triptych, a large (116 × 95 cm) icon of the Theotokos Hodegetria, was originally of precious metal. The repoussé background is now lost and only the enameled face and hands of the Virgin survive.

The triptych is adorned with 115 cloisonné enamels deriving from the workshops of Georgia and Constantinople from the 8th century to the 12th. The enamels are in the form of round medallions, rectangular and cruciform plaques, chiefly with depictions of saints, and some are ornamented with patterning. The cover of the reliquary is adorned with a 10th-century cloisonné plaque with a Crucifixion scene.

Of particular note is the apical enamel of a royal pair whom a Greek inscription identifies as the Byzantine emperor Michael VII Doukas and his Georgian consort Maria, daughter of Bagrat IV of Georgia, both of whom is represented as crowning. This medallion, possibly brought to Georgia by Maria in 1072, was the only visible figural image when the triptych was closed.
