= George II of Georgia =

King of Georgia from 1072 to 1089

George II გიორგი II
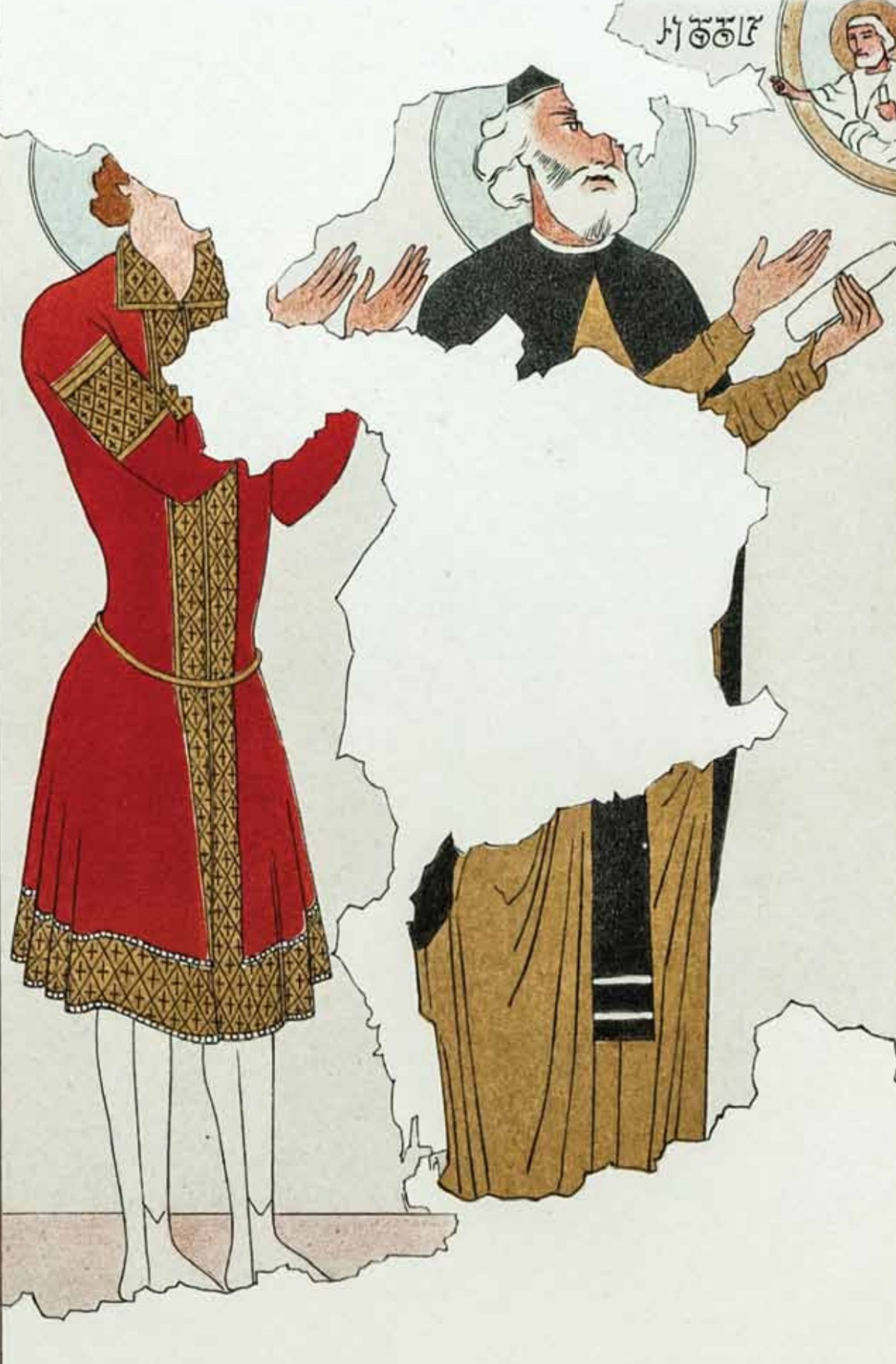
- A fragment of the fresco from the Ateni Sioni Church, purportedly depicting George II as a monk after his abdication in 1089. Reproduction by Grigory Gagarin, 1847

King of Georgia
- Reign: 1072–1089
- Coronation: 1050–1053 (in opposition to father)
- Predecessor: Bagrat IV
- Successor: David IV
- Died: 1112
- Spouse: Helen
- Issue: David IV
- Dynasty: Bagrationi
- Father: Bagrat IV of Georgia
- Mother: Borena of Alania
- Religion: Georgian Orthodox Church
- Khelrtva

There was also a Giorgi II, Catholicos of Kartli who ruled in 826–838.

George II (Georgian: გიორგი II, romanized: giorgi II) (died 1112), of the Bagrationi dynasty, was a king (mepe) of Georgia from 1072 to 1089. He was a son and successor of Bagrat IV and his wife Borena of Alania. Unable to deal effectively with the constant Seljuk Turkish attacks and overwhelmed by internal problems in his kingdom, George was forced to abdicate in favor of his energetic son David IV, to whom he remained a nominal co-ruler until his death in 1112. He also held the high Byzantine titles of curopalates (c. 1060) and caesar (c. 1081).

== Early reign ==
George's childhood coincided with the civil war between his father, Bagrat IV (r. 1027–1072), and the rebellious Georgian feudal lord Liparit, who succeeded in temporarily driving Bagrat into the Byzantine Empire, and crowned George as king at the Ruisi cathedral between 1050 and 1053, under the regency of Bagrat's sister Gurandukht. In fact, Liparit became the master of nearly half of the Georgian kingdom and the most powerful dynast in the country. By 1060, Bagrat IV had been able to secure the throne and made George his heir apparent to whom the Byzantine emperor attached the title of curopalates. In 1070, Prince George, at the head of a combined Georgian-Alan army, inflicted a decisive defeat on the Shaddadid emir of Arran, Fadl II, and ravaged his possessions at Ganja.

== Seljuk invasions ==
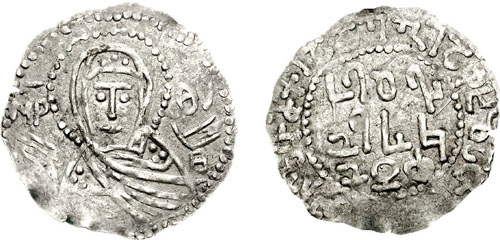
Coin of George II, 1081–1089

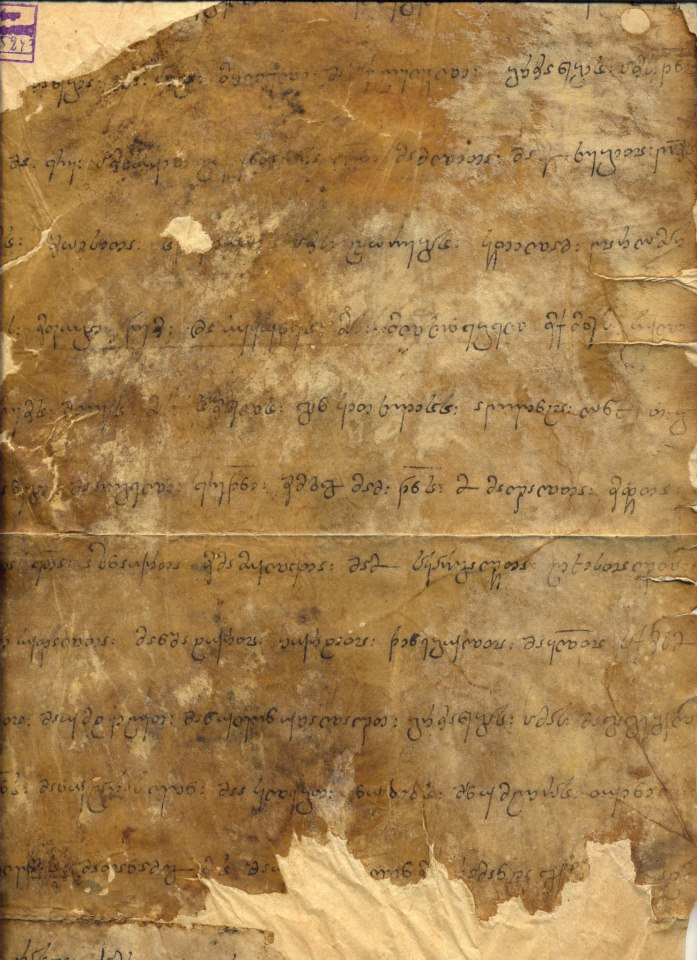
Charter of King George II of Georgia

George succeeded as King of Georgia upon the death of his father in 1072 and received the title of nobelissimos and later that of sebastos from the Byzantine emperor. A year later, he faced a major aristocratic revolt led by Niania Kvabulis-dze, Ivane Liparitis-dze, and Vardan of Svaneti. Although victorious, the king had to buy the rebels’ loyalty through generously awarding them additional estates. Soon, Georgia was attacked again by the Seljuks, a nomadic Turkic people, who would prove to be a major menace to George II's reign. Following the 1073 devastation of Kartli (central Georgia) by the Seljuk sultan Alp Arslan, George successfully repelled an invasion commanded by a Turkish general left by the sultan in charge of the Caucasus. The king also secured the formal return of Upper Tao/Tayk (Theme of Iberia), a frontier region which had been a bone of contention between Georgia and the Byzantine Empire early in the 11th century, by the Byzantine governor, Gregory Pakourianos, who began to evacuate the region shortly after the 1071 disaster inflicted by the Seljuks on the Byzantine army at Manzikert. On this occasion, George was bestowed with the Byzantine title of caesar, granted the fortress of Kars and put in charge of the Imperial Eastern limits. This did not help to stem the Seljuk advance, however. In 1076, the Seljuk sultan Malik Shah I surged into Georgia and reduced many settlements to ruins. Harassed by the massive Turkic influx, known in Georgian history as didi turkoba, or the Great Turkish Invasion, from 1079/80 onward, George was pressured into submitting to Malik-Shah to ensure a precious degree of peace at the price of an annual tribute. George II was even able to garner the Seljuk military support in his campaign aimed at bringing the eastern Georgian Kingdom of Kakheti, which had long resisted the Bagratid attempts of annexation, within a unified Georgian realm. However, tired with a protracted siege of the Kakhetian stronghold of Vezhini, George abandoned the campaign when snow fell, and headed for the Ajameti forests to ease his disappointment by hunting. The Seljuk auxiliaries also lifted the siege and plundered the fertile Iori Valley in Kakheti. Aghsartan I, king of Kakheti, went to the sultan to declare his submission, and in token of loyalty embraced Islam, thus winning a Seljuk protection against the aspirations of the Georgian crown.

== Deposition ==
George II's wavering character and incompetent political decisions coupled with the Seljuk yoke brought the Kingdom of Georgia into a profound crisis which climaxed in the aftermath of a disastrous earthquake that struck Georgia in 1088. In 1089, George handed over the crown to his vigorous sixteen-year-old son David. This changeover is shrouded in mystery and is mentioned only in passing in the Georgian chronicles. All that is recorded is that George crowned his son as king with his own hands, after which he disappears from the chronicle. He was most probably forced by his nobles, in a palace coup masterminded by the powerful minister Bishop Giorgi Chkondideli, to abdicate in favor of David. George is mentioned in prayers dated to 1103 as "king of kings, and caesar of all the East and West", suggesting that he was still alive and given some titles by his reigning son, but exercised no real power.

== Family ==
George II married Helen, and they had an only son: (Note: According to the contemporaneous Armenian chronicler Matthew of Edessa, George also had another children, Totorme, who is mentioned as David IV's sibling.)

- David IV the Builder (1073 – 24 January 1125), King of Georgia (r. 1089–1125).

== Notes ==
Preceded by Bagrat IV	King of Georgia; 1072–1089	Succeeded by David IV
