= Basil Argyros =

Basil Argyros (Greek: Βασίλειος Ἀργυρός, romanized: Basileios Argyros; c. 970 – after 1023) was a Byzantine nobleman and general of the Argyros family and a brother of the emperor Romanos III. Basil was the maternal grandfather of emperor Romanos IV Diogenes.

According to the Synopsis Historion by John Skylitzes, Basil Argyros was the strategos of Samos who was sent to fight the Italian rebel Meles c. 1010/11. It is possible that the account of Basil's career in Italy is the result of Skylitzes' conflation of Argyros with another contemporary Basil, surnamed Mesardonites, who was the catepan of Italy. On the other hand, he may have been a commander of the fleet sent to support Basil Mesardonites in his crackdown on the rebellion. He was recalled from Italy c. 1017. Modern scholars such as Guilou and Vannier consider Basil Argyros and Basil Mesardonites to have been the same person, a view not shared by Alexander Kazhdan.

After a gap in his recorded career, Basil appears as the first Byzantine governor of Vaspurakan, an Armenian kingdom, which was surrendered by its king Senekerim-John to the emperor Basil II in 1021/22. He was removed from the office for incompetence soon after his appointment. The gap in Basil's career can tentatively be filled by the information provided on a seal discovered at Preslav, Bulgaria, on which Basil is named as patrikios and strategos of Thrace.

Basil and his family members played a role in the Byzantine interaction with the empire's eastern neighbors. The marriage of Basil's daughter Helena to the Georgian king Bagrat IV was part of a peace deal negotiated by Bagrat's mother Queen Maria, daughter of the former king Senekerim-John of Vaspurakan, in 1032. Skylitzes also speaks of the sons of Basil as archons who lived in the Anatolic Theme in the mid-11th century. Basil's other daughter, whose name has not survived, was married to the general Constantine Diogenes and became the mother of the future emperor Romanos IV Diogenes.
