= Gregory Gabras =

Gregory Gabras (Greek: Γρηγόριος Γαβρᾶς, romanized: Grēgorios Gabras) was the son of the Byzantine governor of Trebizond, Theodore Gabras who was involved in a minor unsuccessful rebellion against the Emperor Alexios I Komnenos around the year 1091.

== Life at Constantinople ==
As Gregory's father was an important governor and a formidable general, Alexios I was keen to align him with the imperial family. Consequently, Gregory was with his father in Constantinople during the late 1080s when he became engaged to a daughter of Alexios’ brother, the sebastokrator Isaac Komnenos. Gregory was left with the imperial court as his father returned to Trebizond.

Shortly afterwards Gregory's mother died, and his father soon remarried, this time to a noblewoman of the Alani who happened to be the first cousin of Isaac Komnenos’ wife. When this became known in the capital, Gregory's engagement was quietly broken off as they were now considered close relatives and according to civil and the ecclesiastical laws, such marriages were forbidden. Alexios, however, was worried about Theodore's reaction, so he kept Gregory at the court as a hostage in order to ensure Theodore's continued good behaviour, reassuring Theodore with the claim that he was contemplating marrying Gregory to one of his own daughters.

Theodore soon returned to the capital and hatched a plan to abduct his son and return with him to Trebizond. He took the boy as far as the port of Pharus before fleeing by ship into the Euxine. Alexios was soon advised and he responded by sending a squadron of ships to capture father and son. They overtook Theodore near the town of Aeginus and advised him to hand over his son to the emperor's representatives. To persuade him they once again reiterated the emperor's desire to marry Gregory to one of his daughters, Maria Komnene. Seeing he had no choice Theodore complied and Gregory soon found himself once again sequestered within Constantinople.

== Defiance against Alexios I ==
On his return Alexios only ratified the marriage-contract by the usual legal formalities and placed Gregory in the care of one of the Empress’ attendants, the eunuch Michael. Michael soon instituted a rigorous educational and martial program for the boy, which Gregory soon grew to resent. He disliked his tutor, had a hard time following the rules, and was irritated at not being treated with the respect a future member of the imperial family deserved. His thoughts soon turned to how he could escape from the court and return to his father.

Gathering a small group of conspirators, some of whom were soldiers who were close to the emperor, Gregory outlined his plans for escaping. One of them did report Gregory's plans to Alexios, but the emperor refused to believe him. So those few who were loyal to Alexios then hatched a plot to capture the unsuspecting Gregory and his supporters red-handed. When Gregory insisted that he wanted to flee Constantinople immediately, they told him that they would not go along with his plan unless he guaranteed his plot to them by an oath. Gregory agreed and so they took him to the church where one of the nails of Jesus Christ’s crucifixion was kept. Here they told him to steal the sacred relic and bring it out so that he could swear by it. Gregory, being young and naïve, listened to them and stole the sacred object.

At that point, one of the men who had kept the emperor apprised of the conspiracy went to fetch some guards and returned shouting, "Look, here is Gabras, and the sacred nail is within his clothes next to his chest." Gregory was arrested and brought into the emperor's presence, where the nail was revealed. On being questioned he admitted everything while also revealing the names of his fellow conspirators. Alexios found him guilty and sent him to George Mesopotamites, Dux of Philippopolis, who was ordered to keep him imprisoned in one of the towers in the city. Gregory's co-conspirators were all banished or imprisoned.

== Sources ==
- Anna Comnena, The Alexiad, translated E.R.A. Sewter, Penguin Classics, 1969
- George Finlay, History of the Byzantine and Greek Empires from 1057 - 1453, Volume 2, William Blackwood & Sons, 1854
- Skoulatos, Basile (1980). Les personnages byzantins de l'Alexiade: Analyse prosopographique et synthèse [The Byzantine Personalities of the Alexiad: Prosopographical Analysis and Synthesis] (in French). Louvain-la-Neuve and Louvain: Bureau du Recueil Collège Érasme and Éditions Nauwelaerts. OCLC 8468871.
