= Alania Airlines =

Alania Airlines Авиакомпания «Алания»
IATA	ICAO	Call sign
2D	OST	ALANIA
- Founded: 1995
- Ceased operations: 2007 (acquired by VIM Airlines)
- Hubs: Beslan Airport
- Fleet size: 2
- Headquarters: Vladikavkaz, North Ossetia–Alania, Russia
- Key people: Leonid Nikolaevich Myshkin (General Director)
- Website: http://www.airalania.ru/ (defunct)

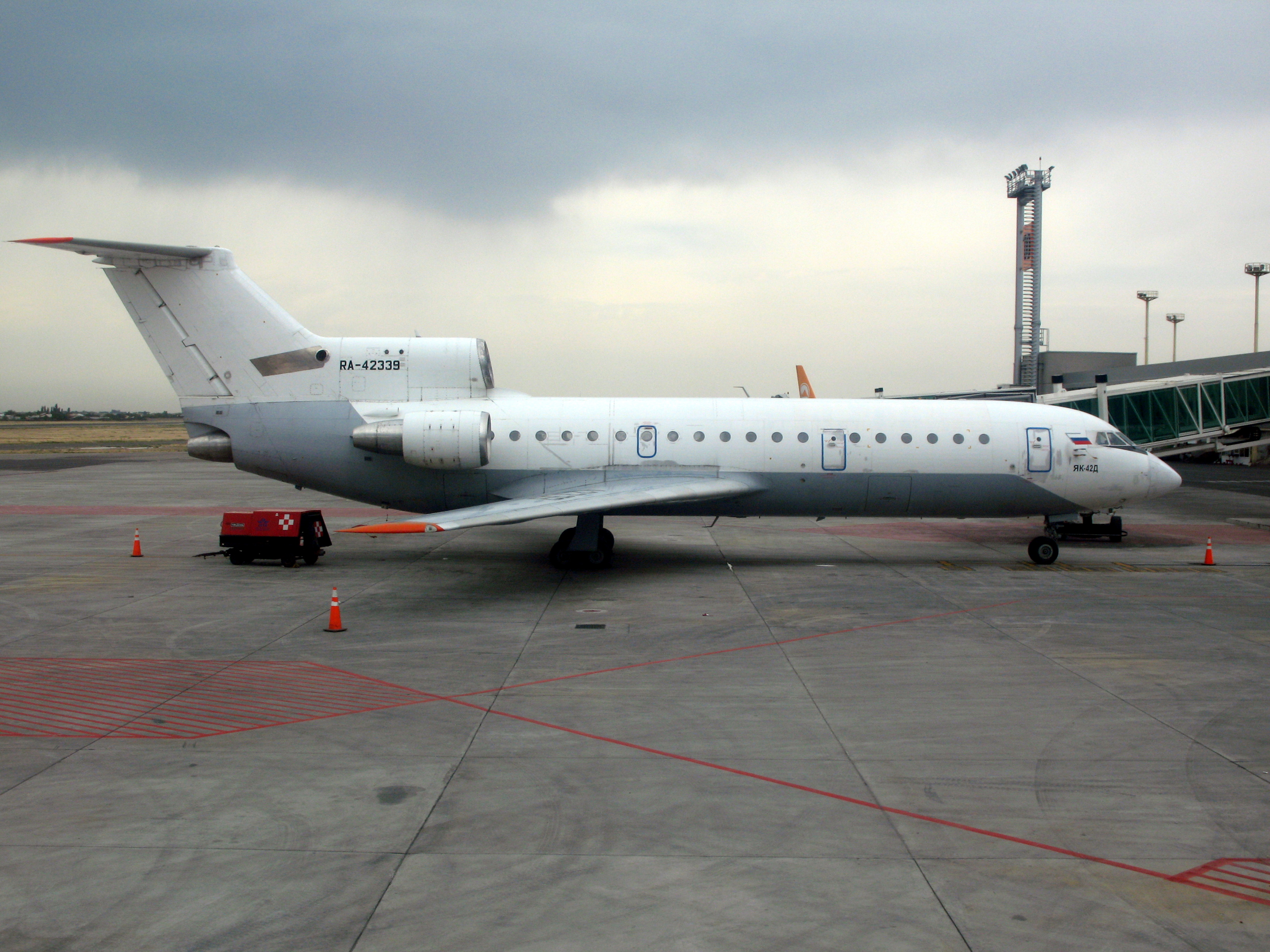
Alania Airlines Yak-42D at Zvartnots Airport

JSC Alania Airlines (Russian: ОАО Авиакомпания «Алания») was an airline based in Vladikavkaz, North Ossetia. It operated charter flights from its base at Beslan Airport. In 2007 it was acquired by VIM Airlines.

== History ==
"Alania" was founded in 1996 as a charter airline. On October 24, 1996, it received its air operator certificate. The airline operated flights from North Ossetia to Moscow using Yak-42D aircraft. Its first flight took place on February 17, 1997, on the Vladikavkaz–Moscow route.

In 2007, "Alania" was acquired by the airline VIM-Avia.

On November 16, 2009, the Federal Air Transport Agency (Rosaviatsiya) suspended Alania Airlines’ air operator certificate “due to non-compliance with the requirements in civil aviation”. On July 15, 2011, the certificate was officially revoked.

== Fleet ==
In August 2007, the Alania Airlines fleet consisted of the following aircraft:

- 2 Yakovlev Yak-42D
