= Maghas =

Medieval capital of the Alans

Political map of the Caucasus region in 1060

Maghas or Maas, more properly, Mags or Maks, was the capital city of Alania, a medieval kingdom in the Greater Caucasus. It is known from Islamic and Chinese sources, but its location is uncertain, with some authors favouring North Ossetia and others pointing to Arkhyz in modern-day Karachay–Cherkessia, where three 10th-century churches still stand.

Historian John Latham Sprinkle from the University of Ghent (Belgium) identified Maghas with an archeological site known as Il'ichevskoye Gorodische in Otradnensky District, Krasnodar Krai.

The destruction of Maghas is ascribed to Batu Khan, a Mongol leader and a grandson of Genghis Khan, in the beginning of 1239. Some Russian geographers, like D. V. Zayats, point to a location in Ingushetia.

The capital of the Russian Republic of Ingushetia, Magas, is named after Maghas.

== Name ==
The name is given in Arabic sources as Maghas or Ma'as, in Persian as Magas or Makas, and in Chinese as Muzashan (木栅山). The name Magas is a homonym of the Persian word magas, meaning "fly", and the medieval writers al-Mas'udi and Juvayni made plays on words about the city's name. The Chinese transcription Muzashan uses the characters for wood (mu, 木) and mountain (shan, 山), which John Latham-Sprinkle interprets as a possible reference to the city's location in rough terrain.

== Contemporary documentation ==
The main historical references for the city of Maghas are al-Mas'udi's Murūj al-Dhahab, written sometime in the 940s; Juvayni's Tarīkh-i Jahāngushāy, from the 1250s; Rashid al-Din Tabib's Jāmi' al-Tawārīkh, written c. 1310; and the Yuanshi, compiled in Ming China around 1369. Al-Mas'udi, who had travelled through the Caucasus in the 930s, wrote that Maghas was the capital of the Alans, or al-Lān, although their unnamed king periodically travelled from one residence to another. Juvayni's account, written three centuries later, is the earliest to mention the Mongol capture of Maghas, although he does not provide a specific date for this event. His account is fairly imprecise in general, and he was apparently misinformed on the location of Maghas in particular, since he implied it was located in Rus' rather than the northern Caucasus. In his description of the Mongol capture of Maghas, he wrote that it was heavily fortified and located in a heavily wooded area, so that the Mongols had to cut paths through the woods for their heavy siege equipment. He wrote that, after the Mongols captured Maghas, they massacred the population, so that there was nothing left of the city but its namesake flies.

The Yuanshi, which contains biographies of commanders serving the Yuan dynasty, provides the most detailed account of the siege of Maghas. In particular, its biography of Shiri-Gambu, an ethnically Tangut commander fighting for the Mongols, states that the siege began in the 11th lunar month of 1239 (i.e. 27 November through 26 December) and ended in the 2nd lunar month of 1240 (i.e. 6-24 February). The final assault of the city was "conducted by a number of small squads", which were apparently composed of ethnically diverse allied troops rather than Mongols themselves — besides the Tangut Shiri-Gambu, the Yuanshi also mentions that there were Qipchaq troops present at the siege, as well as a group of Alans who were Mongol allies. The biography of Shiri-Gambu also describes the city of Maghas as being "surrounded by a high wall, and in a strong natural position".

Vladimir Minorsky argued that another, garbled reference to the city may be found in the Hudud al-Alam, an anonymous Persian geographical text from the 10th-century. While it does not directly mention Maghas, it contains a passage claiming that the people of Sarir, the eastern neighbor of Alania, left food out in order to avoid being eaten by giant flies the size of partridges. Minorsky interpreted this as a possible, somewhat confused reference to Sarir sending tribute to the city of Maghas, based on the name being a homophone for "fly" in Persian.

Other historical sources mentioning Maghas either simply copy from earlier works, such as Yaqut al-Hamawi's Mu'jam al-Buldān, or only mention the city in passing, such as the 13th-century Secret History of the Mongols.

== Sources ==
- Alemany, Augusti (2000). Sources on the Alans: A Critical Compilation. Leiden; Boston; Köln: Brill. pp. 1–464. ISBN 90-04-11442-4.
- Latham-Sprinkle, John (2022). "The Alan Capital *Magas: A Preliminary Identification of Its Location". Bulletin of the School of Oriental and African Studies, University of London. 85 (1): 1–20. doi:10.1017/S0041977X22000453. hdl:1854/LU-8681124. S2CID 249556131.
