= Alda of Alania =

11th-century Alan princess

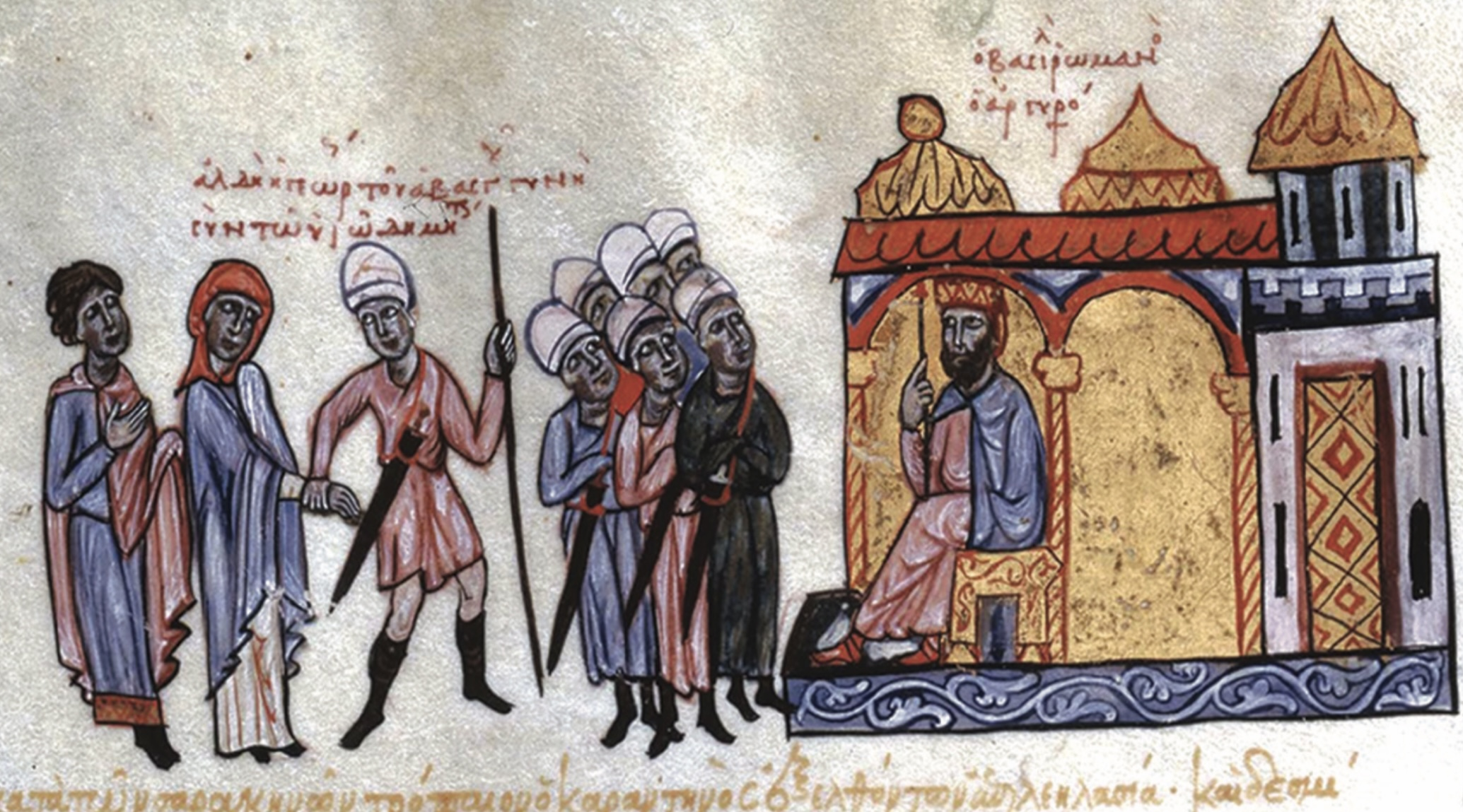
Alda and her son, Demetre shown at far left, meeting Byzantine emperor. Skylitzes Chronicle.

Alda (Georgian: ალდა) or Alde (ალდე) was an 11th-century Alan princess and the second wife of King George I of Georgia (r. 1014–1027). The couple had a son, Demetre, who played a notable role in the civil unrest of Georgia during the reign of his half-brother Bagrat IV.

The "second wife" of George I is mentioned by the medieval Georgian chronicles in a passage relating a futile attempt by a noble party to promote her son, who lived in Anakopia on the shores of Abkhazia, to the throne of Georgia after George's death. Subsequently, Demetre defected to the Byzantines and surrendered Anakopia to the emperor Romanos III Argyros (c. 1033). In the same passage, she is referred to as a "daughter of the king of the Ossetes", "Ossetes" being a Georgian designation of the Alans. Her name Alda (Greek: Ἀλδή) is known from the contemporaneous Byzantine sources. John Skylitzes, corroborating with the Georgian annals, reports that Alda, "wife of George... of the Alan race" surrendered "the very strong fort of Anakopia" to the emperor who honored her son Demetre with the rank of magistros.

As no direct reference to George's repudiation of his first wife Mariam is found in the Georgian chronicles, Alda is thought by some historians, such as Marie-Félicité Brosset, to have been a concubine, but the legitimacy of George's marriage to Alda does not appear to be questioned in the contemporary sources. After Mariam's return to prominence following George's death and her accession to the regency for her underage son Bagrat IV, Alda and her son Demetre fled to the Byzantine empire. Demetre spent nearly two decades in attempts to seize the Georgian crown, supported in his struggle by the powerful duke Liparit of Kldekari and the Byzantines. He died c. 1053. After this, according to the 18th-century Georgian historian Prince Vakhushti of Kartli, Demetre's son David was taken by his grandmother (i.e., Alda, not mentioned by her name) to Alania, where his descendants flourished, producing a local "royal" line, of which came David Soslan, the second husband of Queen Tamar of Georgia (r. 1184–1213).

== Notes ==
Royal titles
Preceded by Mariam of Vaspurakan	Queen consort of Georgia c. 1018–1027	Succeeded by Helena Argyre
