= Maria of Alania =

Byzantine empress from 1071 to 1081

- Augusta
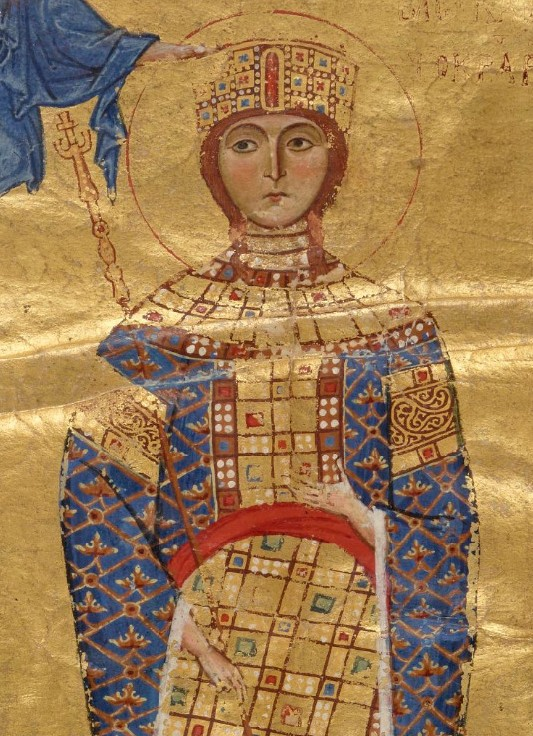

Byzantine empress consort
- Tenure: 1071–1081
- Born: 1053; Kingdom of Georgia
- Died: 1118 (aged 64–65); Byzantine Empire
- Spouse: Michael VII Doukas (1065–1078); Nikephoros III Botaneiates (1078–1081)
- Issue: Constantine Doukas
- Dynasty: Bagrationi
- Father: Bagrat IV of Georgia
- Mother: Borena of Alania
- Religion: Georgian Orthodox Church
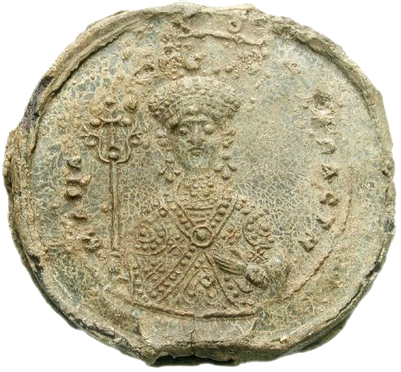
- Seal

Maria of Alania (Greek: Μαρία Ἀλανή; born Martha; Georgian: მართა; 1053–1118) was Byzantine empress by marriages to emperors Michael VII Doukas and Nikephoros III Botaneiates. Her status as empress was considered a significant success for a newly unified Kingdom of Georgia, which would achieve regional influence comparable to that of Byzantium only during the reign of Martha's nephew, King David IV, who refused to carry a Byzantine title. Maria was the only foreign Byzantine empress of the eleventh century.

== Early years ==
A daughter of the Georgian monarch Bagrat IV, Martha, at the age of 5 years, was sent as a hostage to Constantinople to ensure her father's good behavior and further her education at the Byzantine court under the patronage of Empress Theodora in 1056. The latter, however, died later in the year and Martha returned home to Georgia.

== Empress of Michael VII Doukas ==
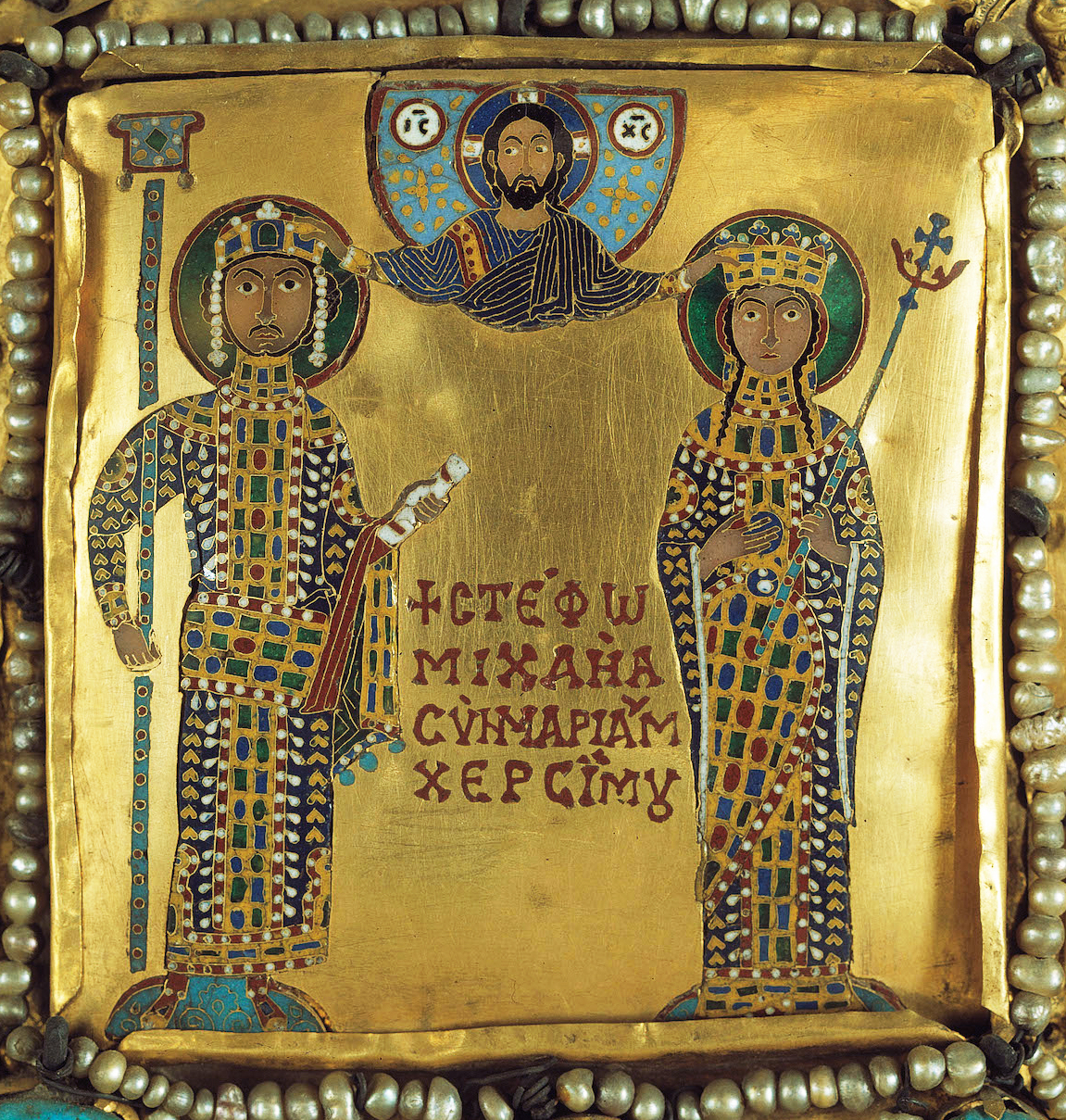
A medieval Georgian icon in gold and precious stones commemorating the marriage of then Princess Martha to Michael VII.

In 1065 she married the junior emperor Michael, a son of Constantine X Doukas, and became an empress when Michael became the senior emperor in 1071.

Maria's first marriage was marred by Michael's military failures in Anatolia against the Seljuk Turks, as well as currency devaluation, which caused growing dissatisfaction and culminated in a 1078 coup that ousted Michael and enthroned Nikephoros III Botaneiates. Michael was forced to become a monk at the Stoudios Monastery and Maria went to a Petrion monastery with her son Constantine, but she did not become a nun, possibly hinting that she had some future plans at the imperial court.

== Empress of Nikephoros III ==
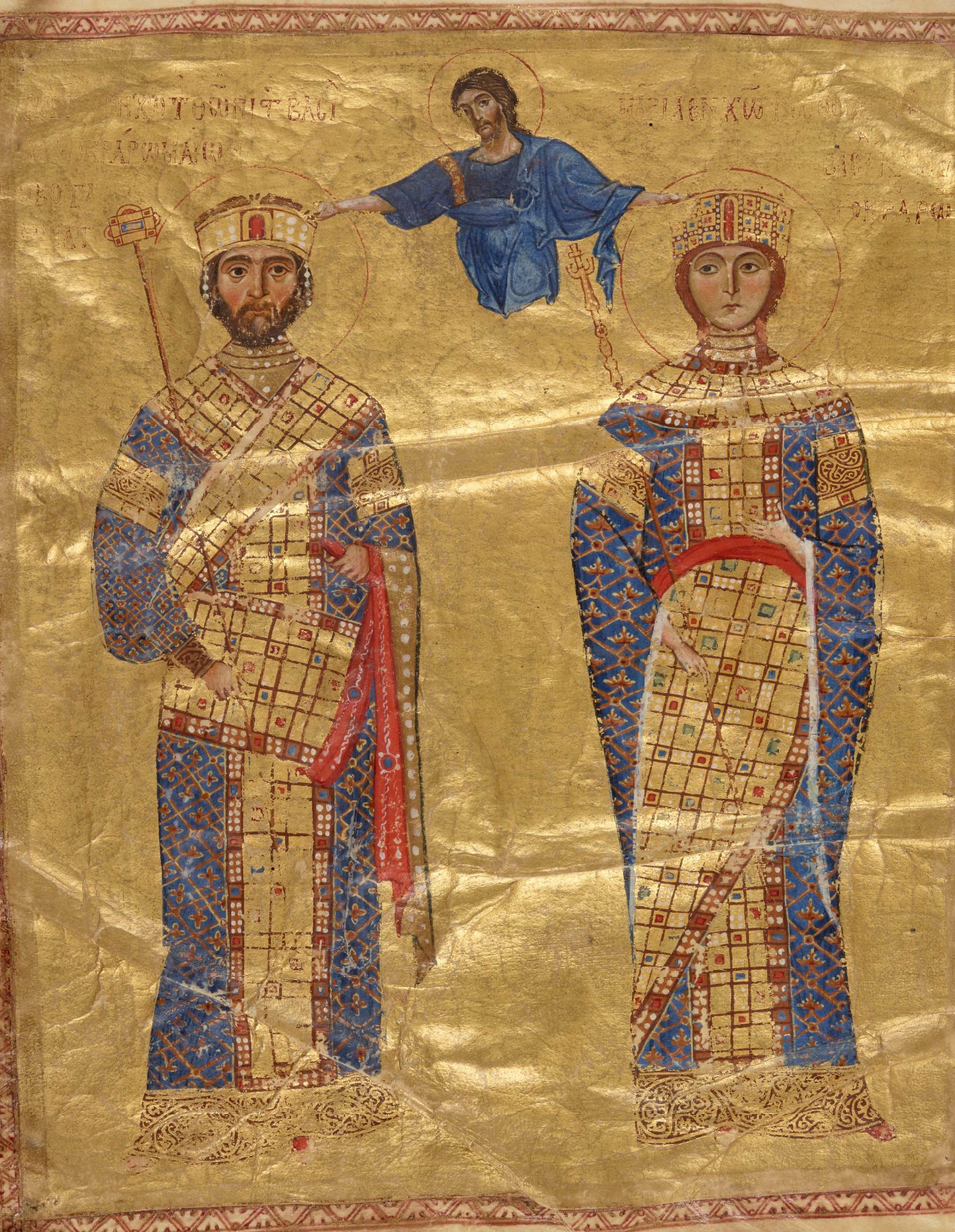
A medieval miniature commemorating the marriage of Maria and Nikephoros III Botaneiates.

Nikephoros' wife died shortly before his accession to the throne and he announced his intention to remarry, which triggered fierce competition among all the unmarried women of Constantinople, and even between Maria, her former mother-in-law Eudokia Makrembolitissa, and Eudokia's daughter Zoe. The new emperor was first inclined to marry Eudokia but Maria received a strong support of her Doukas in-laws, who convinced Nikephoros to select her because of her beauty and the benefits of having a foreign-born wife with no domestic relatives who could interfere in Nikephoros' rule. In addition, by this move Nikephoros would pacify the loyalists of the ousted Doukas.

Because Maria's first husband Michael was still alive, even as a monk, her marriage to the new emperor was considered adulterous by the Orthodox Church. The ceremony took place in 1078; a priest who refused to marry the couple was demoted, by order of Maria's prominent supporter John Doukas, and replaced with another priest who was more cooperative. As part of the marriage deal, Maria was promised that her son Constantine would be named an heir to the empire, but Nikephoros reneged on this promise at a later point. He otherwise treated Maria generously, granting her extensive lands and property and giving her brother, George II of Georgia, the title of Caesar, to acknowledge his close ties to the imperial family.

== Second imperial coup ==
According to princess Anna Komnene, daughter of emperor Alexios Komnenos who was under care of Maria, despite all the influence the empress wielded at the court, she remained dissatisfied with Nikephoros' refusal to name her son Constantine as an heir: "[Nikephoros] would have ensured his own safety to the end... the empress, moreover, would have had more confidence in him; she would have been more loyal. The old man did not realize the unfairness and inexpediency of his plans, unaware that he was bringing evil on his own head". The empress became an important part of a plot organized by the general Alexios Komnenos, who was rumored to be her lover. Alexios forced Nikephoros to abdicate the throne and was himself crowned emperor in 1081.

== Reign of Alexios ==
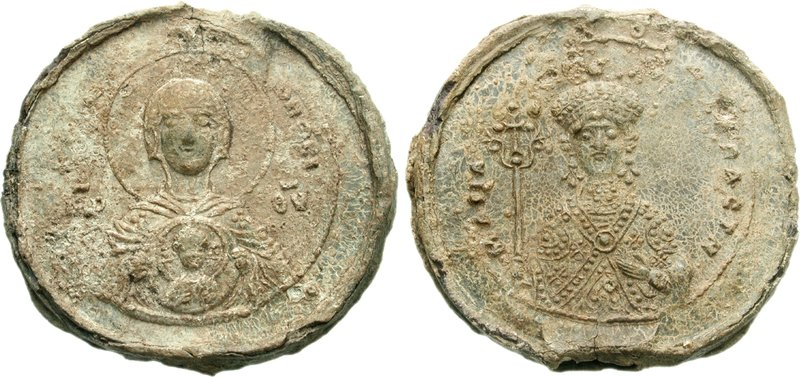
Lead seal of Empress Maria, 1070s

Alexios had Constantine proclaimed heir to the throne and later betrothed his daughter, Anna Komnene, to Constantine. This situation changed drastically when Alexios had a son, the future emperor John II Komnenos, by the Empress consort Irene Doukaina in 1087: Anna's engagement with Constantine was dissolved, the latter was deprived of his status of heir-apparent and Maria forced to retire to a monastery.

After her dethronement and a period at a monastery, Maria lived in the Mangana palace, where she organized "an alternative court" as mother of the co-emperor and mother-in-law designate of the emperor's eldest daughter. Despite being officially a nun and wearing a veil, this transition made little difference to Maria's lifestyle and she continued her usual charitable activities, including donations to the Georgian monastery of Iviron on Mount Athos, and the building of a convent named Kappatha at Jerusalem with her mother Borena. Maria commanded great wealth and owned the Mangana palace, as well as the Hebdomon Monastery, the burial place of Basil II. She was also patron of numerous literary figures, including Theophylact of Ohrid, future Archbishop of Bulgaria, and the Georgian neo-Platonist Ioane Petritsi.

Years of Maria's influence at the court, however, manifested itself in the fact that Constantine received a status of a co-emperor, a higher title than that of Emperor's older brother Isaac, and Maria received guarantees of personal safety. Maria was also charged with the care of young imperial princess Anna Komnene who was very fond of her and shared all her secrets with the former empress.

Anna Komnene describes Maria's beauty in her medieval biographical text Alexiad. She writes about Maria the following:

For once before he had succeeded in providing for her, namely, after Michael Ducas' deposition, when he had advised the latter's successor, Nicephorus Botaniates, to take her in marriage, because she came from another country and had not a crowd of kinsfolk to give the Emperor trouble, and he had told Botaniates a great deal about her family and personal beauty, and often praised her to him. And certainly she was as slender of stature as a cypress, her skin was white as snow, and though her face was not a perfect round, yet her complexion was exactly like a spring flower or a rose. And what mortal could describe the radiance of her eyes? Her eyebrows were well-marked and red-gold, while her eyes were blue. Full many a painter's hand has successfully imitated the colours of the various flowers the seasons bring, but this queen's beauty, the radiance of her grace and the charm and sweetness of her manners surpassed all description and all art. Never did Apelles or Pheidias or any of the sculptors produce a statue so beautiful. The Gorgon's head was said to turn those who looked upon it into stone, but anyone who saw the Queen walking or met her unexpectedly, would have gaped and remained rooted to the spot, speechless, as if apparently robbed of his mind and wits. There was such harmony of limbs and features, such perfect relation of the whole to the parts and of the parts to the whole, as was never before seen in a mortal body, she was a living statue, a joy to all true lovers of the beautiful. In a word, she was an incarnation of Love come down to this terrestrial globe.

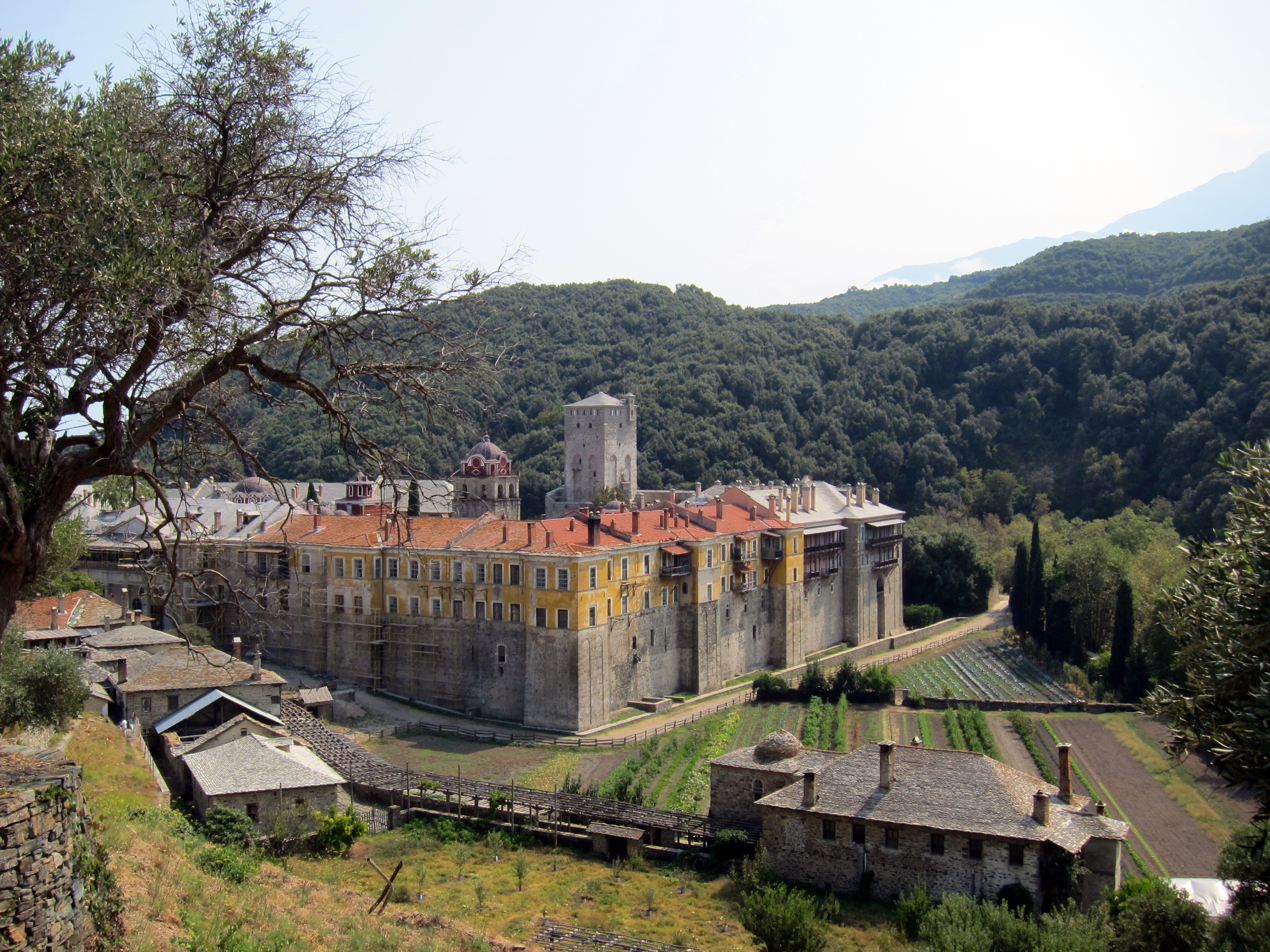
Empress Maria supported the Georgian Iviron Monastery.

== Final years ==
After Maria's son Constantine died in 1096, she finally moved herself to a monastery, purportedly in a heavily Georgian-influenced area like North Eastern Anatolia. She remained revered in her native Georgia, resulting in an increase in future marriages between the Georgian and Byzantine royalty, and strengthening of ties between the two countries. Maria was also an influence for Komnenian women who were impressed by her past political involvement and charitable work.

== Sources ==
- Lynda Garland, Byzantine Empresses: Women and Power in Byzantium AD 527–1204, first edition (1999), Routledge, ISBN 0-415-14688-7, pages 180–186
- Lynda Garland (2006), Byzantine Women: Varieties of Experience, 800–1200 p. 91–124, ISBN 0-7546-5737-X
- J. M. Hussey, editor, The Cambridge Medieval History, Volume IV The Byzantine Empire, Part 1 Byzantium and Its Neighbours (Bentley House, 200 Euston Road, London: The Syndics of the Cambridge University Press, 1966), p. 793

Maria of Alania Bagrationi dynasty Born: c. 1050 Died: after 1103
Royal titles
| Preceded by Eudokia Makrembolitissa | Byzantine empress consort 1071–1081 | Succeeded by Irene Doukaina |
