= Bagrat IV of Georgia =

King of Georgia from 1027 to 1072

Bagrat IV
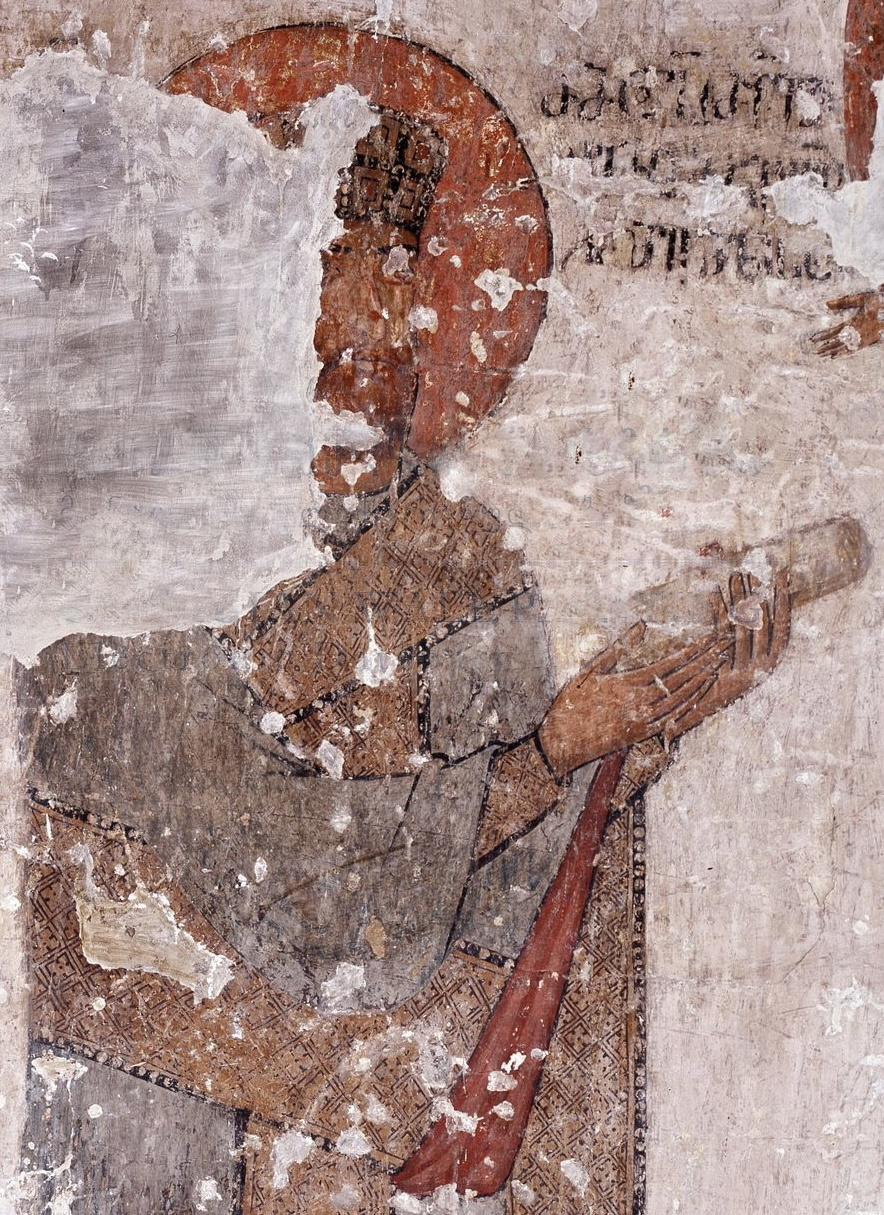
- Fresco of Bagrat IV from Ateni Sioni

King of Georgia
- Reign: 16 August 1027 – 24 November 1072
- Predecessor: George I
- Successor: George II
- Regent: Mariam of Vaspurakan (1027–1037)
- Born: 1018
- Died: 24 November 1072 (aged 53–54)
- Burial: Chkondidi Monastery
- Spouse: Helena Argyre; Borena of Alania
- Issue: George II of Georgia; Maria of Alania; Mariam
- Dynasty: Bagrationi
- Father: George I of Georgia
- Mother: Mariam of Vaspurakan
- Religion: Georgian Orthodox Church
- Khelrtva

Bagrat IV (Georgian: ბაგრატ IV; 1018 – 24 November 1072), of the Bagrationi dynasty, was the king (mepe) of the Kingdom of Georgia from 1027 to 1072. During his long and eventful reign, Bagrat sought to repress the great nobility and to secure Georgia's sovereignty from the Byzantine and Seljuk Empires. In a series of intermingled conflicts, Bagrat succeeded in defeating his most powerful vassals and rivals of the Liparitid family, bringing several feudal enclaves under his control and reducing the kings of Lori and Kakheti-Hereti, as well as the emir of Tbilisi to vassalage. Like many medieval Caucasian rulers, he bore several Byzantine titles, particularly those of Nobilissimus, Kouropalates, and sebastos.

== Early reign ==
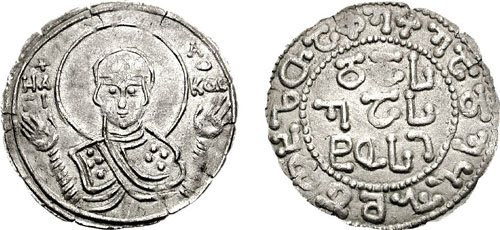
Coin of Bagrat IV, struck between 1060 and 1072.

Bagrat was the son of the king George I of Georgia (r. 1014–1027) by his first wife Mariam of Vaspurakan. At the age of three, Bagrat was surrendered by his father as a hostage to the Byzantine emperor Basil II (r. 976–1025) as a price for George's defeat in the 1022 war with the Byzantines. The young child Bagrat spent the next three years in the imperial capital of Constantinople and was released in 1025. He was still in Byzantine territory when Basil died and was succeeded by his brother Constantine VIII (r. 1025–1028). Constantine ordered the retrieval of the young prince, but the imperial courier was unable to overtake Bagrat – he was already in the Kingdom of Georgia.

After George I died in 1027, Bagrat, aged eight, succeeded to the throne. Queen dowager Mariam then returned to prominence and became a regent for her underage son. She shared the regency with the grandees, particularly Liparit IV of Kldekari, and Ivane, Duke of Kartli.

By the time Bagrat became king, the Bagratids' drive to complete the unification of all Georgian lands had gained irreversible momentum. The kings of Georgia sat at Kutaisi in western Georgia from which they ran all of what had been the Kingdom of Abkhazia and a greater portion of Iberia/Kartli; Tao/Tayk had been lost to the Byzantines while a Muslim emir remained in Tbilisi and the kings of Kakheti obstinately defended their autonomy in easternmost Georgia. Furthermore, the loyalty of great nobles to the Georgian crown was far from stable. During Bagrat's minority, the regency had advanced the positions of the high nobility whose influence he subsequently tried to limit when he assumed full ruling powers. Simultaneously, the Georgian crown was confronted with two formidable external foes: the Byzantine Empire and the rising Seljuq Turks. Although the Byzantine Empire and Georgia had centuries-long cultural and religious ties, and the Seljuqs posed a substantial threat to the empire itself, Constantinople's aggressiveness on the Caucasian political scene contributed to an atmosphere of distrust and recrimination, and prevented the two Christian nations from effective cooperation against the common threat. With assertion of the Georgian Bagratid hegemony in the Caucasus being the cornerstone of Bagrat's reign, his policy can be understood as the attempt to play the Seljuqs and Byzantines off against one another.

== Dynastic wars ==
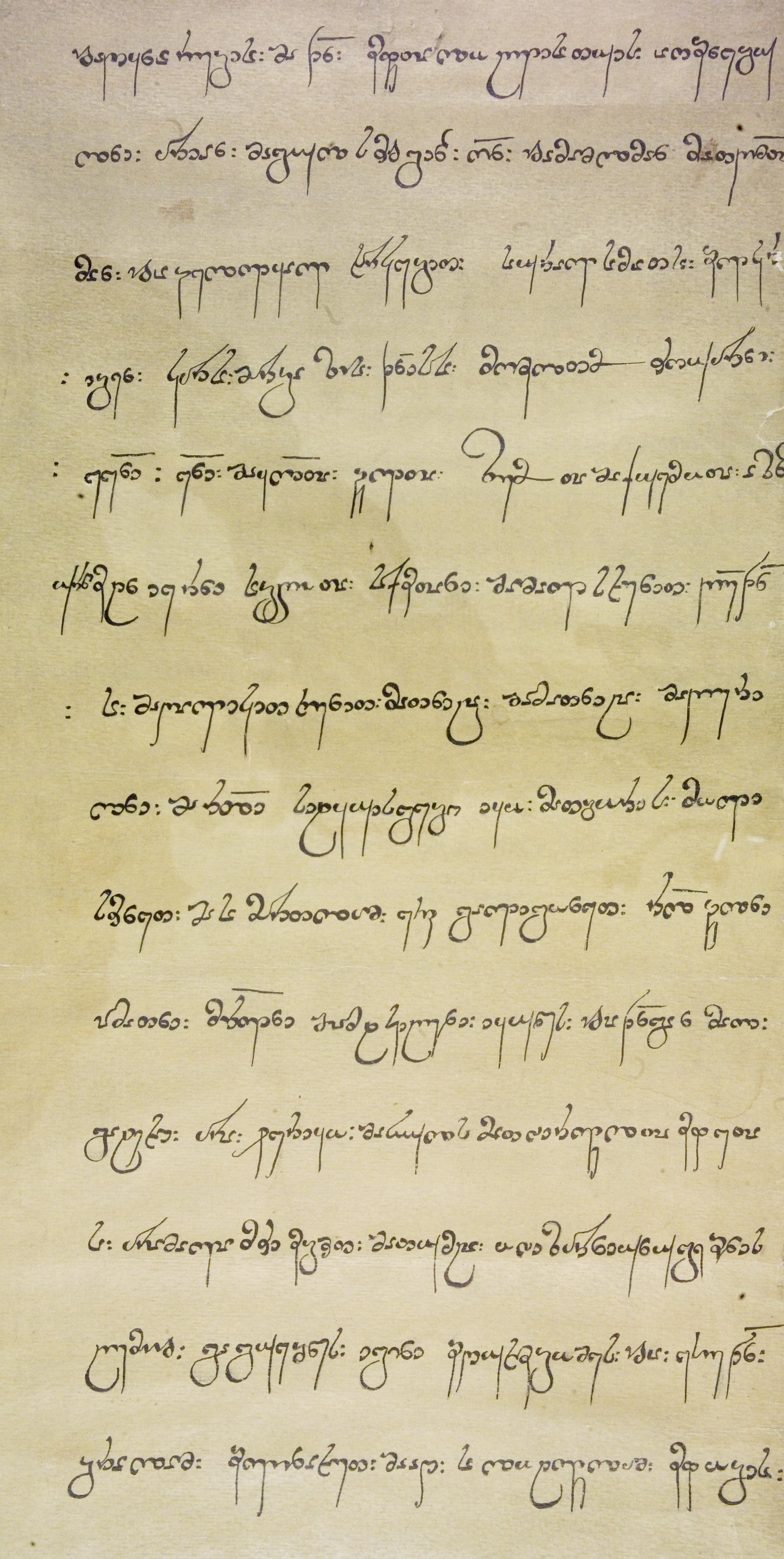
Bagrat IV's charter, 1060–1065

Shortly after Bagrat's ascension to the throne, Constantine VIII sent in an army to take over the key city-fortress of Artanuji (modern Ardanuç, Turkey) on behalf of the Georgian Bagratid prince Demetre, son of Gurgen of Klarjeti, who had been dispossessed by Bagrat IV's grandfather, Bagrat III, of his patrimonial fief at Artanuji early in the 1010s. Several Georgians nobles defected to the Byzantines, but Bagrat's loyal subjects put up a stubborn fight.

Constantine's death in 1028 rendered the Byzantine invasion abortive, and, in 1030, Queen Mariam paid a visit to the new emperor Romanos III (r. 1028–1034). She negotiated a peace treaty, and returned with the high Byzantine title of curopalates for her son in 1032. Mariam also brought him the Byzantine princess Helena Argyre as wife. Helena was a daughter of Basil Argyros, brother of Emperor Romanos, and the marriage was a diplomatic effort to establish a strategic association. However, Helena's death shortly afterwards at Kutaisi presented the Georgian court with the opportunity to pursue yet another diplomatic initiative through Bagrat's marriage with Borena, daughter of the king of Alania, a Christian country in the North Caucasus.

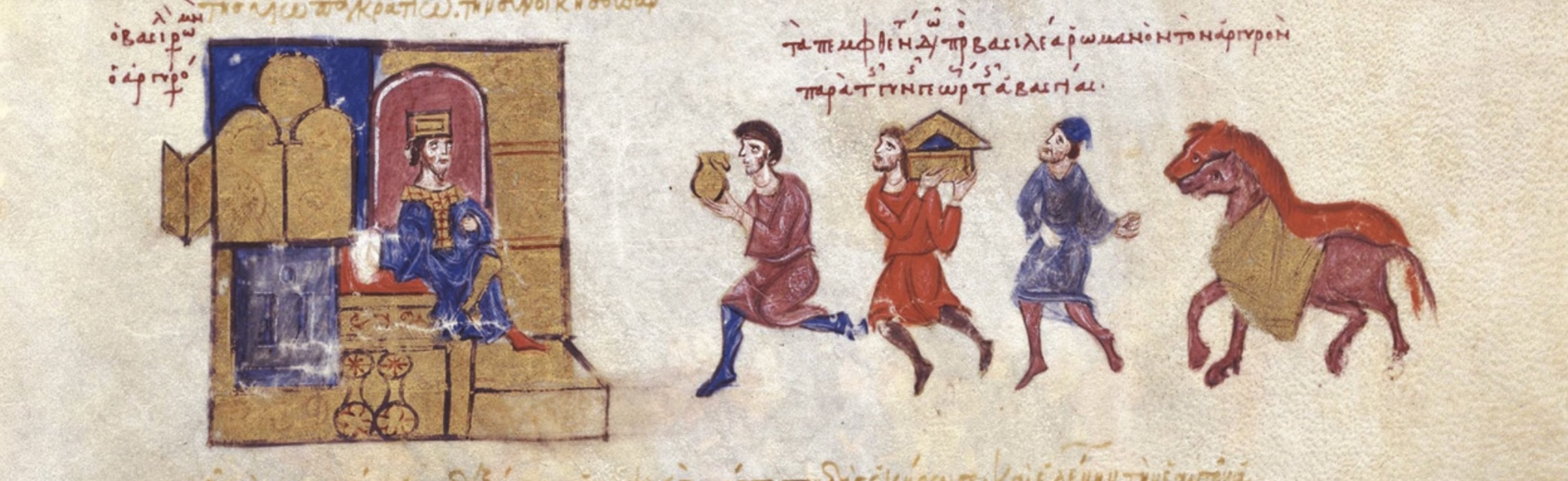
Georgian ambassadors presenting gifts to Emperor Romanos Argyros.

In 1033, the royal court faced another dynastic trouble, this time with Bagrat's half-brother Demetrius, a son of George I of his second marriage with Alda of Alania. Demetrius and Alda lived in Anakopia, a fortress in Abkhazia, which had been bequeathed to them by the late king George I. Although an attempt by some great nobles to exploit Demetrius' possible aspirations to the throne in their opposition to Bagrat's rule failed, the Georgian court's efforts to win his loyalty also went in vain. Threatened by Bagrat, the dowager queen Alda defected to the Byzantines and surrendered Anakopia to the emperor Romanos III who honored her son Demetrius with the rank of magistros.

In 1039, Demetrius returned to Georgia with Byzantine troops. This time, he was supported by Liparit IV, of the Liparitid clan, the most powerful noble in Georgia.

Liparit, as duke of the district of Trialeti and later as a commander-in-chief of the royal armies, had appeared as the defender of a boy-king Bagrat early in the 1030s. Liparit's military prowess had been demonstrated once again in 1034 when, at the head of a combined Georgian-Armenian army, he defeated a Shaddadid troops in Arran. In 1038, Liparit was on the verge of capturing the ancient Georgian capital of Tbilisi, which had been a Muslim stronghold since the 8th century. Fearing his growing power, the Georgian nobles persuaded Bagrat to withdraw Liparit's army and thus thwarted the plan. As a result, Liparit became a sworn enemy of the king and began actively cooperating with the Byzantines for vengeance on Bagrat and his nobles.

On behalf of the pretender Demetrius, Liparit enjoyed a series of successes against Bagrat. In spite of Demetrius' death in 1042, Liparit continued his struggle in alliance with the Byzantines and David I of Lorri. After the defeat at Battle of Sasireti, Bagrat was left with the western provinces only. During the Seljuk campaigns in Anatolia in 1048, Liparit, who had been fighting on the Byzantine side, was captured at the Battle of Kapetron. Bagrat took advantage of this, and returned to his eastern possessions. The king's fortunes were quickly reversed, however, upon Liparit's return from captivity. The rebellious duke forced Bagrat to flee to Constantinople where he was kept, as a result of Liparit's intrigues, for three years. In the absence of Bagrat (1050–1053), Liparit was an effective ruler of Georgia; he even installed Bagrat's son George as king and declared himself a regent. After Bagrat's return, Liparit again warred against him. Eventually in 1060 his followers conspired and surrendered the duke to King Bagrat, who forced him into a monastery. Now, Bagrat gained a momentum to restrict the power of dynastic princes, reduced the kings of Lorri and Kakheti to impotence, and briefly held Tbilisi.

== Seljuk attacks ==
In the 1060s, Bagrat faced with an even greater problem: the Seljuks under Alp Arslan started to penetrate the frontier regions of Georgia. Bagrat had to buy peace through marrying his niece to Alp Arslan sometime after 1064. She later married the Seljuk Persian vizier Nizam al-Mulk.

The Seljuk threat prompted the Georgian and Byzantine governments to seek a closer cooperation. To secure the alliance, Bagrat's daughter Mart'a (Maria) married, at some point between 1066 and 1071, the Byzantine co-emperor Michael VII Ducas. The choice of a Georgian princess was unprecedented, and it was seen in Georgia as a diplomatic success on Bagrat's side.

On 10 December 1068, Alp Arslan accompanied by the kings of Lorri and Kakheti as well as the emir of Tbilisi again marched against Bagrat. The provinces of Kartli and Argveti were occupied and pillaged. Bagrat's long-time rivals, the Shaddadids of Arran, were given compensation: the fortresses of Tbilisi and Rustavi. After Alp Arslan left Georgia, Bagrat recovered Kartli in July 1068. Fadl ibn Shavur, of the Shaddadids, encamped at Isani (a suburb of Tbilisi on the left bank of the Mtkvari) and with 33,000 men ravaged the countryside. Bagrat defeated him, however, and forced the Shaddadid troops to flight. On the road through Kakheti, Fadl was taken prisoner by the local ruler Aghsartan. At the price of conceding several fortresses on the Iori River, Bagrat ransomed Fadl and received from him the surrender of Tbilisi where he reinstated a local emir on the terms of vassalage.

The last years of Bagrat's reign coincided with what Professor David Marshall Lang described as "the final débacle of eastern Christendom" — the Battle of Manzikert — in which Alp Arslan dealt a crushing defeat to the Byzantine army, capturing the emperor Romanos IV, who was soon deposed and died in misery. Bagrat IV died the following year, on 24 November 1072, and was buried at the Chkondidi Monastery. The suzerainty over the troubled kingdom of Georgia passed to his son George II.

== Family ==
Bagrat IV was married to Helena, daughter of Basil Argyros and niece of the Byzantine emperor Romanos III Argyros, in 1033. They had no children together.

He later married Borena of Alania, and from this marriage, their children were:

- George II of Georgia (c. 1050 – 1112), king of the Kingdom of Georgia from 1072 to 1089
- Maria of Alania (1053–1118), married to emperors Michael VII Doukas and Nikephoros III Botaneiates.
- Mary, who around 1091 possibly married Theodore Gabras, Duke of Trebizond

== See also ==
- Bagrat III of Klarjeti
- Gurandukht of Georgia

Preceded by George I	King of Georgia; 1027–1072	Succeeded by George II
