= Alania =

State in North Caucasus, 9th-13th centuries

Kingdom of Alania
- Late 9th century–1240
- Map of the Caucasus c.1060, with Alania in teal
- Status: Kingdom
- Capital: Maghas
- Common languages: Alanic
- Religion: Scythian religion Orthodox Christianity (since the 10th century)
- Government: Monarchy
- Historical era: Middle Ages
  - Independence from the Khazars: Late 9th century
  - Fall of Maghas during Mongol invasion of Alania: 1240
Preceded by	Succeeded by
Khazar Khaganate	Mongol Empire

Alania was a medieval kingdom of the Alans that flourished between the 9th and 13th centuries in the Northern Caucasus area, inhabited by the Iranian-speaking Alans and various native north Caucasian ethnic groups. With its capital known as Maghas, the location of which is still disputed, it became independent from the Khazars and in the late 9th century. The state was Christianized by a Byzantine missionary sent by Constantinople soon after, in the early 10th century.

Reaching its peak in the 11th century, under the rule of King Durgulel, it profited from controlling a vital trade route through the Darial Pass. It maintained close relations not only with the Byzantine Empire but also the Kingdom of Georgia, as well as the small Dagestani kingdom of Sarir; the first two also employed Alan mercenaries, who were infamous horsemen. It was responsible for spreading Orthodox Christianity among neighboring pagan peoples such as the Circassians and Vainakhs. The kingdom eventually declined from the 12th century and had largely ceased to function as a political entity by the early 13th century. In 1239/1240 the Mongols invaded, stormed and destroyed the capital, Maghas, in the process.

== Name ==
The name Alania derives from the Old Iranian stem *Aryāna-, a derivative form of the Indo-Iranian stem *arya- ('Aryan'). It is cognate with the name of Iran (Ērān), which stems from the Old Persian *Aryānām ('of the Aryans').

In other sources, they are mentioned as "Ās". In Russian chronicles, a designation of the Ossetians created by the Georgians. and in Hungarian sources they are called "Yas".

== Territory ==
The Caucasian Alans occupied part of the Caucasian plain and the foothills of the main mountain chain from the headwaters of the Kuban river and its tributary, Zelenchuk in the west, to the Darial Gorge in the east. In the 10th century the Arab historian al-Masʿūdī indicates that the Alan kingdom stretched from Daghestan to Abkhazia. According to Ḥudūd al-ʿĀlam, In the north, the Alans bordered on the Hungarians and the Bulgars. In the east they gave their name to the Darial Gorge, called "Gate of the Alans". Before the Mongol invasion, the Alans lived in the territory from the Laba River to the Argun.

== Society ==
According to al-Masʿūdī, the Alan ruler was powerful and influential among the neighboring rulers being able to muster 30,000 horsemen. He also said "The Alan kingdom consisted of an uninterrupted series of settlements; when the cock crows (in one of them), the answer comes from the other parts of the kingdom, because the villages are intermingled and close together." According to Ḥudūd al-ʿĀlam, Alania is described as a vast country with 1,000 settlements. The population consisted of both Christians and Pagans, mountaineers and nomads.

== History ==
The Alans (Alani) originated as an Iranian-speaking subdivision of the Sarmatians. They were split by the invasion of the Huns into two parts, the European and the Caucasian. The Caucasian Alans occupied part of the North Caucasian plain and the foothills of the main mountain chain from the headwaters of the Kuban River in the west to the Darial Gorge in the east.

=== As vassal of Khazaria ===
Alania was an important buffer state during the Byzantine-Arab Wars and Khazar-Arab Wars of the 8th century. Theophanes the Confessor left a detailed account of Leo the Isaurian's mission to Alania in the early 8th century. Leo was instructed by Emperor Justinian II to bribe the Alan leader Itaxes into severing his "ancient friendship" with the Kingdom of Abkhazia, which had allied itself with Caliph Al-Walid I. He crossed the mountain passes and concluded an alliance with the Alans, but was prevented from returning to Byzantium through Abasgia. Although the Abkhazians spared no expense to have him imprisoned, the Alans refused to convey the Byzantine envoy to his enemies. After several months of adventures in the Northern Caucasus, Leo extricated himself from the precarious situation and returned to Constantinople.

The Darial Gorge on a 19th-century photo by Alexander Roinashvili. On the hill behind the modern Russian fortress are the remains of the medieval border castle (sometimes called "Tamara's castle") separating Alania from Georgia.

After Leo assumed the imperial title, the land of his mountaineer allies was invaded by Umar II's forces. The Khazar Khagan, Barjik, hastened to their succour and, in 722, the joint Alan-Khazar army inflicted a defeat on the Arab general Tabit al-Nahrani. The Khazars erected Skhimar and several other strongholds in Alania at this period. In 728 Maslamah ibn Abd al-Malik, having penetrated the Gate of the Alans, devastated the country of the Alans. Eight years later, Marwan ibn Muhammad passed by the Gate in order to ravage the forts in Alania. In 758, as Ibn al-Faqih reports, the Gate was held by another Arab general, Yazid ibn Usayd.

As a result of their united stand against the successive waves of invaders from the south, the Alans of the Caucasus fell under the overlordship of the Khazar Khaganate. They remained staunch allies of the Khazars in the 9th century, supporting them against a Byzantine-led coalition during the reign of the Khazar king Benjamin. According to the anonymous author of the Schechter Letter, many Alans were during this period adherents of Judaism.

=== Independence and Christianization (late 9th–10th centuries) ===
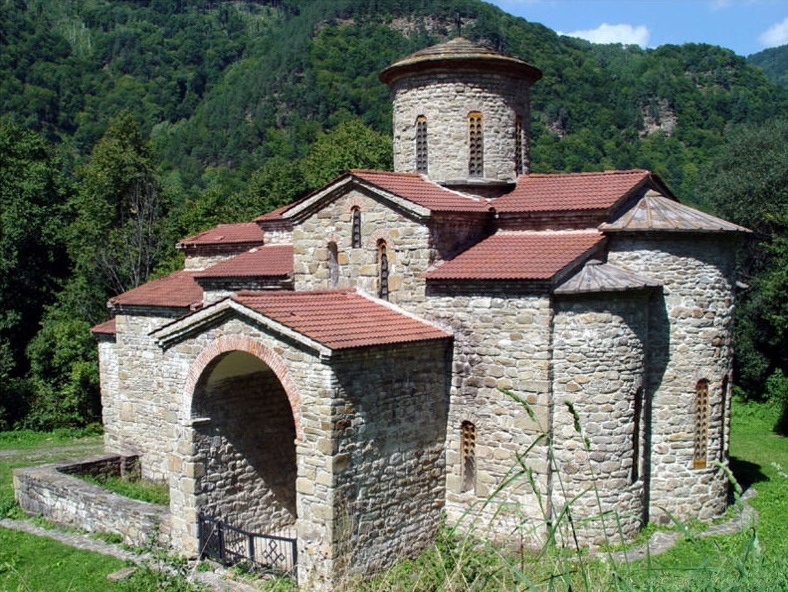
Surviving architectural monuments of the Alanian kingdom include three churches in Arkhyz, the Shoana Church, and the Senty Church.

In the late 9th century, Alania became independent from the Khazars. In the early 10th century, the Alans fell under the influence of the Byzantine Empire due to King Constantine III of Abkhazia's activities in the North Caucasus and were converted to Christianity. The conversion is documented in the letters of Patriarch Nicholas Mysticus to the local archbishop, Peter, who was appointed here through King George II of Abkhazia's efforts. Richard Foltz has suggested that only certain elite Alan families were Christianized, the bulk of the population continuing to follow their original pagan traditions.

When Ibn Rustah visited Alania at some point between 903 and 913, its king was Christian by then. The Persian traveler came to Alania from Sarir, a Christian kingdom immediately to the east:

You go to the left from the kingdom of Sarir and, after three days of journey through mountains and meadows, arrive in the kingdom of Al-Lan. Their king is Christian at heart, but all his people are idolaters. Then you travel for ten days among rivers and woods before arriving at a fortress called the "Gate of the Alans". It stands on the top of a mountain at the foot of which there is a road; high mountains surround it and a thousand men from among its inhabitants guard its walls day and night.

In around 932, however, the Alans abandoned Christianity, and expelled their priests.

=== Later history (11th–13th centuries) ===
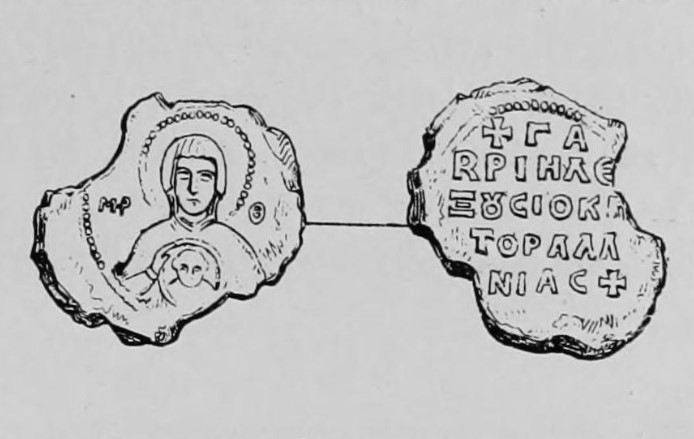
Greek seal of Gabriel, exousiokrator and king of Alania, c. 1030–1045

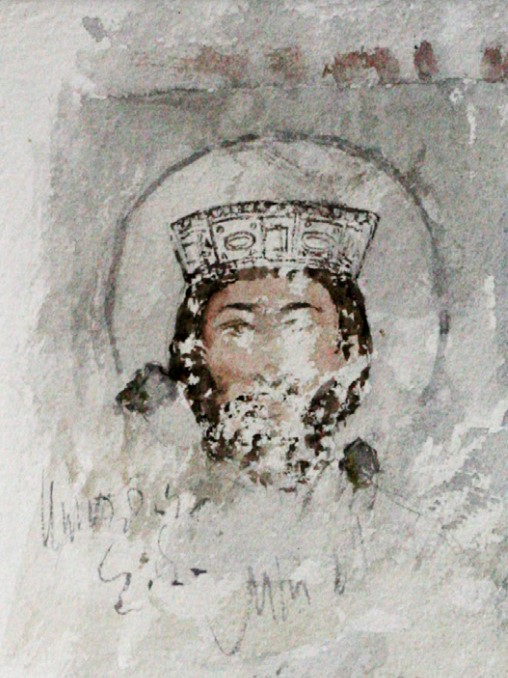
Possible depiction of an 11th-century Alan king, perhaps Durgulel the Great, in the Senty church

After the downfall of Khazaria, the Alan kings frequently allied with the Byzantines and various Georgian rulers for protection against encroachments by northern steppe peoples such as the Pechenegs and Kipchaks. John Skylitzes reports that Alda of Alania, after the death of her husband, "George of Abasgia" (i.e., George I of Georgia), received Anakopia as a maritime fief from Emperor Romanus III. This happened in 1033, the year when the Alans and the Rus sacked the coast of Shirvan in modern-day Azerbaijan.

The raids were possibly orchestrated by the Byzantine Empire and its Rus vassal in Tmutarakan, prince Mstislav, and might have been meant to intimidate the various Muslim emirates in the Caucasus in face of the planned Byzantine expansion in Armenia. The Rus raiders might have been arrivals from Scandinavia who entered Byzantium in 1030. The Alan king at that time seems to have been called Gabriel, known from a contemporary Greek seal where he styled himself by the Byzantine title exousiokrator.

Alania is not mentioned in East Slavic chronicles, but archaeology indicates that the Alans maintained trade contacts with the Rus' principality of Tmutarakan. There is a stone grave cross, with a Cyrillic inscription from 1041, standing on the bank of the Bolshoi Yegorlyk River in present-day Stavropol Krai, immediately north of Alania. Two Russian crosses, datable to ca. 1200, were discovered by archaeologists in Arkhyz, the heartland of medieval Alania.

The Alans and Georgians probably collaborated in the Christianization of the Vainakhs and Dvals in the 12th and 13th centuries, Georgian missionaries were active in Alania and the Alan contingents were frequently employed by the Georgian monarchs against their Muslim neighbors. The Alanian-Georgian alliance was cemented in the 1060s, when the Alans struck across Muslim Arran and sacked Ganja. In the 1120s King David the Builder of Georgia visited the Darial to reconcile the Alans with the Kipchaks, who thereupon were allowed to pass through Alania to the Georgian soil. David's son, Demetre I, also journeyed, c. 1153, to Alania accompanied by the Arab historian Ibn al-Azraq. The alliance culminated in 1187, when the Alanian prince David Soslan married Queen Tamar of Georgia, a half-Alanian herself, with their descendants ruling Georgia until the 19th century. The medieval Alanian princesses also married Byzantine and Russian Rurikid rulers more than once. For instance, Maria the Ossetian, who founded the Convent of Princesses in Vladimir, was the wife of Vsevolod the Big Nest and grandmother of Alexander Nevsky.

=== Mongol conquest and aftermath (13th–14th centuries) ===
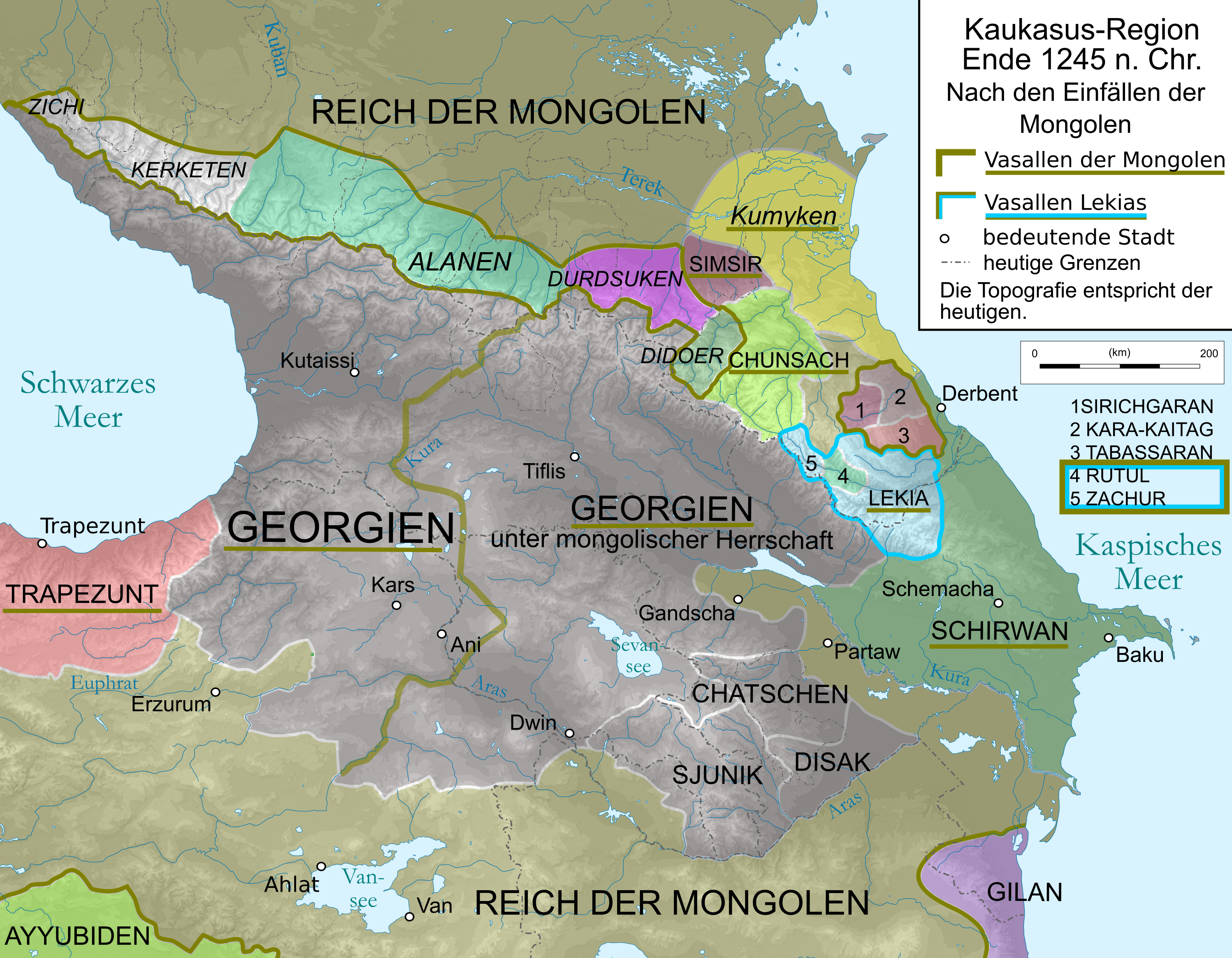
Political map of the Caucasus region in 1245

By the early 13th century the kingdom of Alania had factually disintegrated into a large number of autonomous clans and villages ruled by infighting chiefs leading several dozen to several hundred retainers. This state of anarchy was described by the Hungarian monk Julian, who in 1236 observed that "there are as many princes as villages, none of whom owes allegiance to another. The war there is incessant, leader against leader, village against village." In 1220, Genghis Khan sent his military leaders Subudei and Jebe on a campaign to reach "eleven countries and peoples", among which were "Asut" (Alania). The Mongols, led by the generals Jebe and Subutai, met the Alans for the first time in 1222 after passing through Shirvan and Daghestan. They were confronted by a Kipchak-Alan alliance, which they defeated by scheming with the Kipchaks. Afterwards, they pushed further west, crushing a Rus alliance at the Kalka river in 1223.

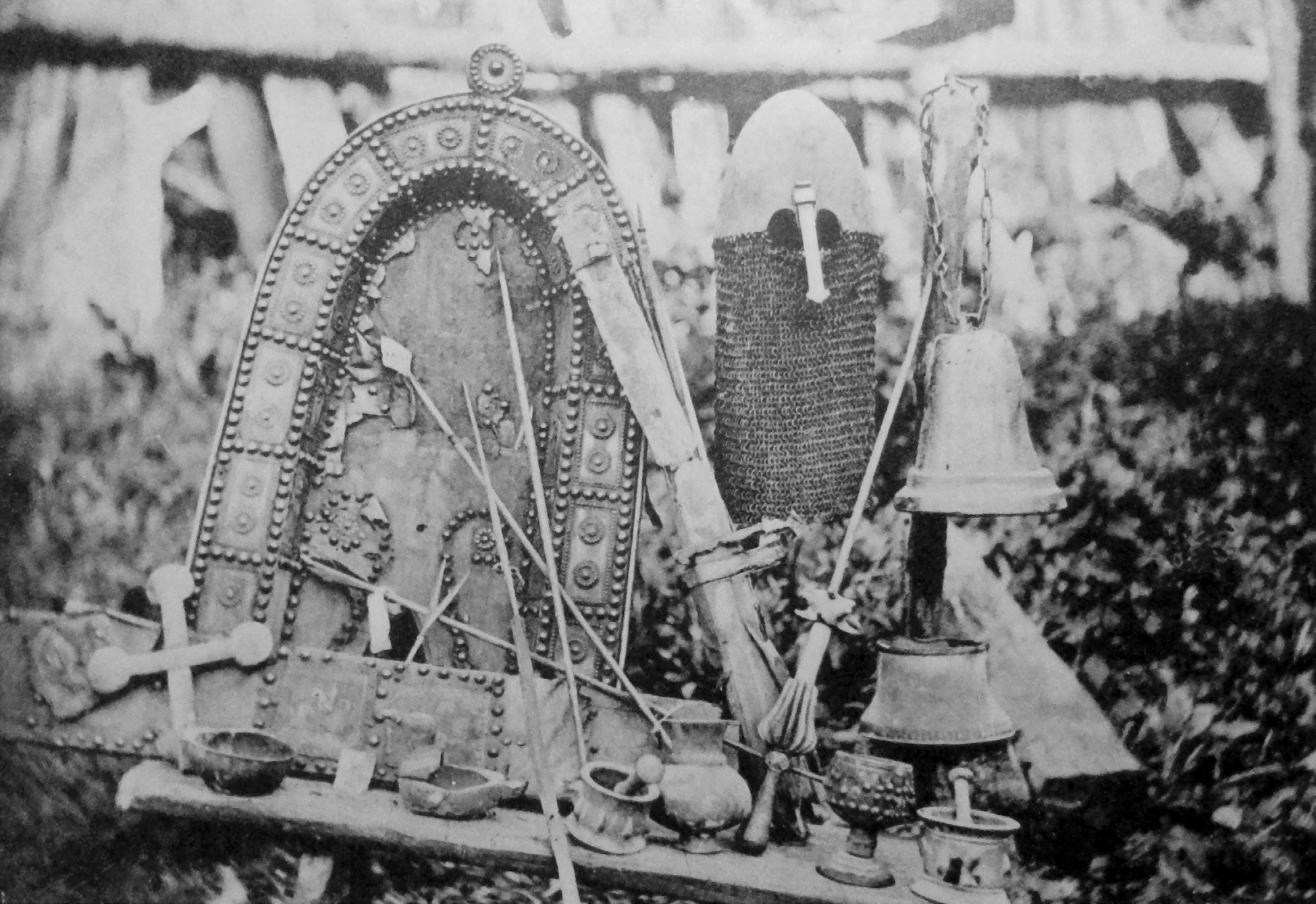
The shrine of Rekom, North Ossetia-Alania. The helmet is said to have belonged to legendary "Os Baqatar", an Alan warrior chief who lived around the turn of the 14th century.

The second Mongol invasion of Alania began in 1239 under Möngke and Güyük. While some Alanian fortresses, in particular the capital; Maghas, resisted the Mongols it seems that many local noblemen actually collaborated with the invaders to gain an advantage over their rivals. Those who resisted formed a confederation led by a certain Ajis. The climax of the invasion was the siege of Maghas, which began in November or December 1239 and lasted until February 1240. Aided by Alan auxiliaries, the fortress eventually fell and the population got massacred. Ajis himself was captured. A sizeable portion of the Alans fled westwards into Europe, where some settled in Hungary probably still in 1239, where they became known as the Jassic people (jászsok) who preserved their language until the 16th century. While others continued on reaching as far as Northern Africa.

After the invasion the Mongols installed two local vassal princes, called, according to the Yuan chronicle, Arslan and Hanghusi, to rule on their behalf. Both joined the Mongol army, but were killed in combat soon afterwards. With the departure of the army in 1240 Mongol influence quickly weakened, especially in the highlands. Appreciating their skill as horsemen, the Mongols deported thousands of Alans to Mongolia in their need of fresh warriors for the conquest of the Southern Song and Dali. They became known as asud in Mongolian or asu in Mandarin and were part of the privileged semu class, foreigners from western and central Asia who were employed in the administration and the higher echelons of the military. When Kubilai Khan, who had a daughter with an Alan woman himself, founded the Yuan Dynasty in 1271 he also established an influential Alan guard unit of 3.000 men that until 1309 was said to number 30.000 men. Converted to Catholicism by a Franciscan missionary in 1299, they stayed loyal to the Yuan until the fall of the dynasty in 1368, when they escorted Toghon Temür to Mongolia. They continued to play a significant factor (Note: A prominent asud figure was Arughtai, who from 1400 to 1434 acted as a kingmaker in the Northern Yuan dynasty.) in Mongolian politics until a failed rebellion in 1510, although remaining, while now completely Mongolized, distinct clans to this day.

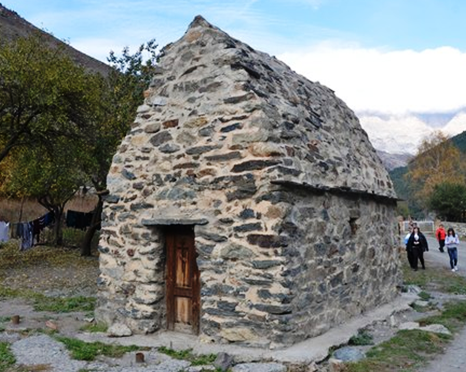
The Nuzal chapel, which was probably built in the second half of the 13th century and still contains various Christian frescoes.

Bishop Theodore of Alania described the plight of his metropolis in a lengthy epistolary sermon written during the tenure of Patriarch Germanus II (1222–40). The French-Flemish monk and traveller William of Rubruck mentions Alans numerous times in the account of his 1253–1255 journey through Eurasia to the Great Khan, e.g. Alans living as Mongol subjects in Crimea, Old Astrakhan, the Khan's capital Karakoram, and also still as freemen in their Caucasian homeland ("the Alans or Aas, who are Christians and still fight the Tartars").

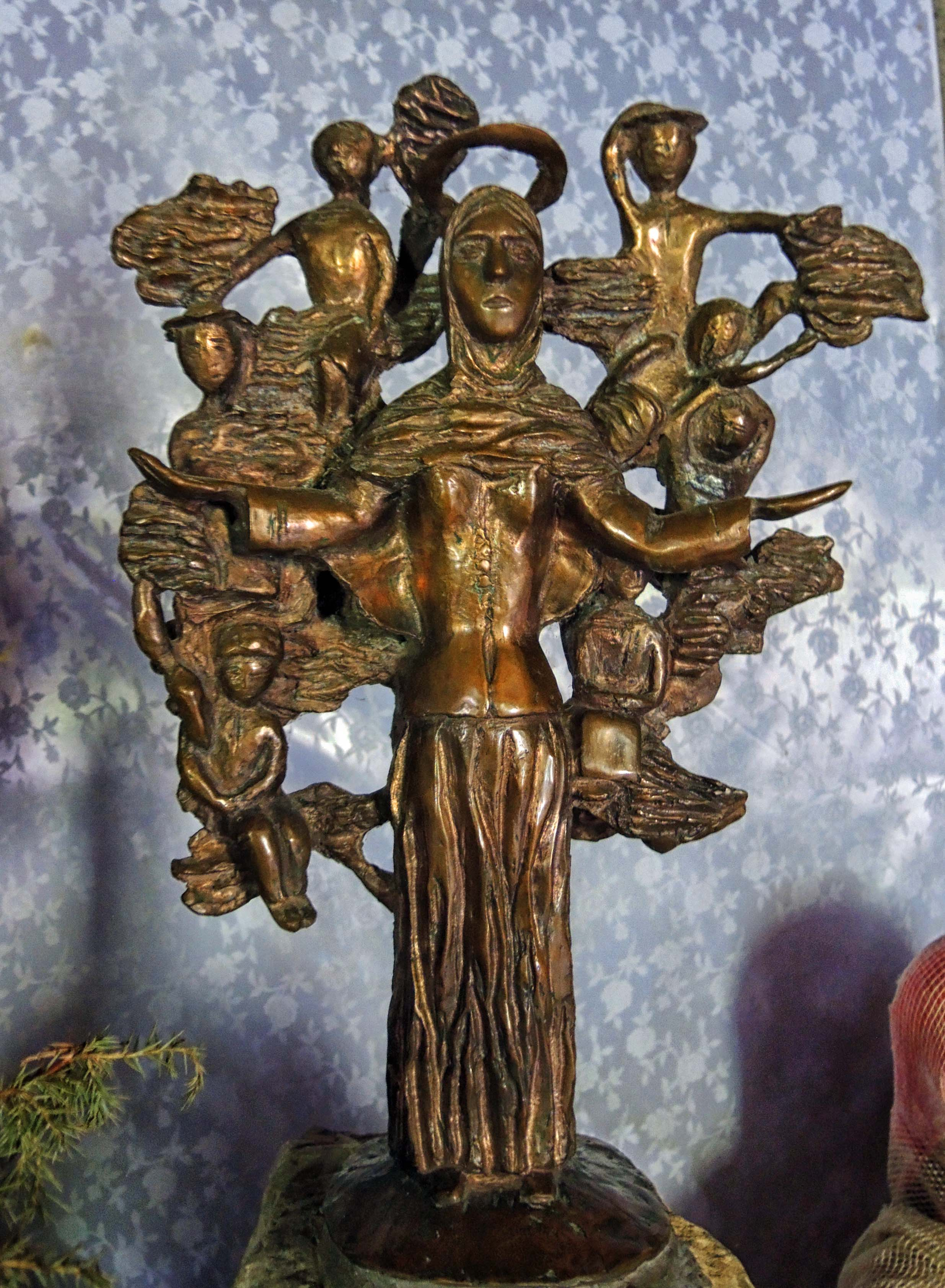
Figurine of folk heroine "Zadaleski Nana" ("the mother of Zadalesk"), also known as "mother of the Ossetes", who is said to have hid orphaned children in a cave during Tamerlane's invasion.

Classic Alania finally came to an end in the late 14th century, when the Turco-Mongol warlord Tamerlane invaded. Crushing the Golden Horde at the Battle of the Terek River in 1395, he subsequently attacked several Alan chiefs, resulting in months of massacres and enslavement that are still remembered in a popular Ossetian folk song called "the mother of Zadalesk". The invasion of Tamerlane resulted in the flight of the Alans deep into the Caucasian mountains and the end of the Alans' presence in the steppes north of the Caucasus. The few who remained were eventually absorbed into the Circassian Kabardians and the Turkic Karachays and Balkars. The Alanian retreat into the mountains resulted in the subsequent ethnogenesis of the modern-day Ossetians, represented by various subgroups like the Digor in the west and the Iron in the east. The Ossetes/Ossetians remained in a state of near-total isolation until 1774, when they requested protection from the Russian Empire, resulting in the foundation of Vladikavkaz in 1784 and the beginning of the Russian conquest of the Caucasus.

== Known rulers ==
The nomenclature used by the rulers of Alania is unknown. Where they are mentioned by historical records, they are variously called "lord", "prince", "king", "tsar", and by the Byzantines, exousiokrator. Notably, the Byzantines never referred to other foreign rulers by this title, using arkhon or exousiastes instead.

=== Non-dynastic/dynasty unknown ===
- Bazuk - c. late 1st/early 2nd century; allied with the Arsacid kings of Iberia
- Anbazuk/Ambazuk - co-ruled with previous
- Ashkhadar - c. early 4th century; father of Ashkhen, wife of Trdat III of Armenia
- Itaz - waged war against Abkhazia in the early 8th century
- David - c. late 10th century, fl. 964/965; named by Byzantine Greek inscriptions in the Senty Church as the exousiokrator of Alania during the reign of Nikephoros II Phokas, when the Senty Church was built. The same inscription names a woman called Maria as his exousiokratorissa. David and Maria may be baptismal names.

=== Tsarazon/Tsærasantæ dynasty ===
- Urdur/Urdura/Urdure/Ordur - c. early 11th century;Prince Ordur united alans into a powerful state, in honor of which he received the title of King of Ossetia; invaded Kakheti around 1029 and died in battle against Kvirike III. According to Vakhushti of Kartli, Kvirike was assassinated by an Alan slave in revenge.
- Durgulel the Great - c. 11th century; son of previous, father or brother of Alda of Alania and Borena of Alania. Byzantine seals refer to him as Gabriel, which may represent a baptismal name. Sometimes considered to be identical with his predecessor.
- Rosmik - c. early 12th century; fought with the Byzantines against the Normans invading Epirus c. 1107/8
- Khuddan - c. 12th century; father of Burdukhan of Alania, wife of George III of Georgia

=== Bagrationi dynasty ===
- David - c. 12th century; grandson of Alda of Alania; forced to flee Georgia after his father Demetrius unsuccessfully tried to claim the throne. He and his descendants married into the Tsarazon dynasty and became the rulers of Alania
- Aton - son of previous
- Jadaron - son of previous
- David Soslan - c. 1207; son of Jadaron, married Tamar of Georgia

=== Non-dynastic/dynasty unknown ===
- Kachir-Ukule/Kachiruk Ulu (Kachiruk/Atsyrukh the Senior? Compare with David Ulu) - c. 1237 - last known ruler of the united Alan kingdom. Captured and killed by the Mongols.
- Indiabu - c. 13th century

=== Akhsartaggata ===
- Unknown Alanian ruler from the Akhsartaggata dynasty - c. 13th century. Died in the battle between Berke and Hulagu in 1263.
- Peredjan - c. 1280–1291; son of the previous one. Alanian ruler in exile in Georgia, ally of David VIII.
- Os-Bagatar - c. 1292–1306; is the younger brother of the previous. After his brother's death, he began to ravage Kartli, in 1292 he captured the city of Gori, the fortress of Dzami and its environs, thereby creating Transcaucasian Alania. He also controlled the territory of the Alagir Gorge. He died in 1306, after which Alania weakened, and George the Brilliant in 1326 after three years of struggle expelled the Alans from the South Caucasus.

== Legacy ==
In the last years of the Soviet Union, Ossetians rekindled their connection to the name "Alania" by formally making it part of their republican title. With other north Caucasian nationalities also preserving traditions and cultural links tied to the medieval Alan's. A leading Ossetian philologist T. A. Guriev was the main advocate of this idea, insisting that the Ossetians should accept the name of the Alans as their self-designation and rename North Ossetia into Alania. The term "Alania" quickly became popular in Ossetian daily life through the names of various enterprises, a TV channel, political and civic organizations, a publishing house, a soccer team, an airline company, etc. In November 1994, the name of "Alania" was officially added to the republican title (Republic of North Ossetia–Alania). The partially recognised republic of South Ossetia is formally known as the State of Alania since 2017.

== Gallery ==
Alanic inscription on a (lost) Christian funeral stele (Zelenchuk Inscription)

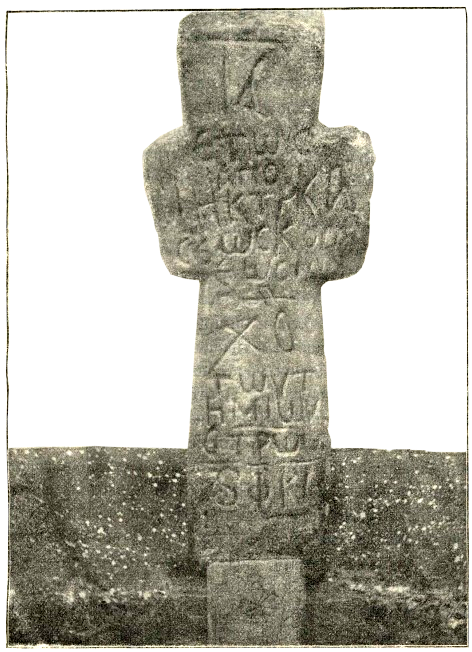
Stone cross from the North Zelenchusky Church with Greek inscription dated to the year 1012/1013

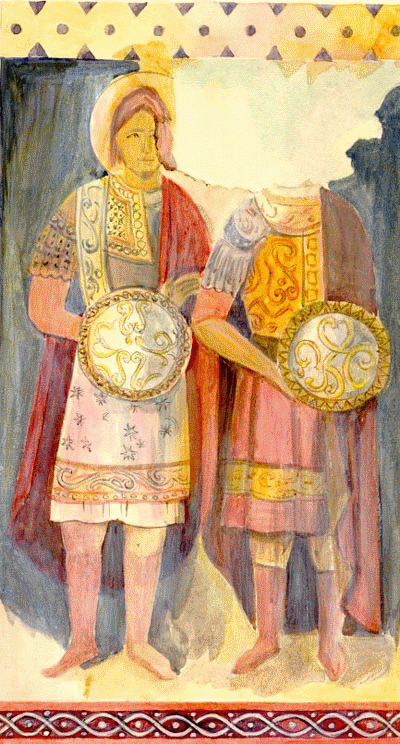
Late 19th century copy of a mural from the Central Zelenchuksky Church

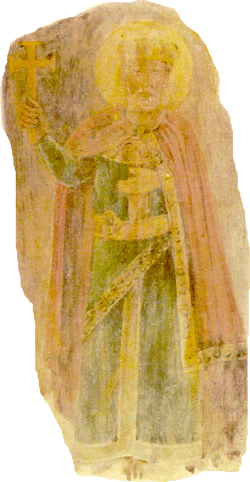
Late 19th century copy of a mural from the Central Zelenchuksky Church
