= George I of Georgia =

King of Georgia from 1014 to 1027

George I გიორგი I
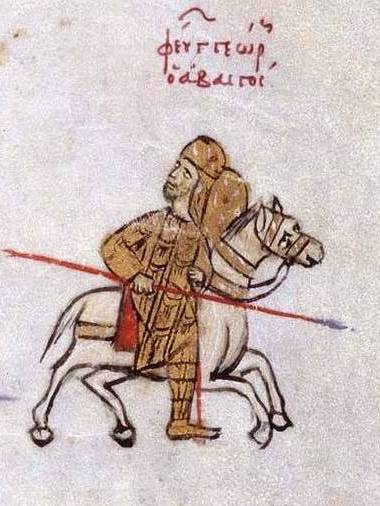
- Depiction of George I ("Georgios of Abasgia") fleeing on horseback from Emperor Basil II after defeat, Skylitzes Chronicle

King of Georgia
- Reign: 7 May 1014 – 16 August 1027
- Predecessor: Bagrat III
- Successor: Bagrat IV
- Born: 998 or 1002
- Died: 16 August 1027; Mqinwarni or Itaroni
- Burial: Bagrati Cathedral, Kutaisi
- Spouse: Mariam of Vaspurakan; Alda of Alania
- Issue: Bagrat IV of Georgia; Princess Gurandukht; Princess Kata; Princess Martha; Prince Demetrius
- Dynasty: Bagrationi
- Father: Bagrat III of Georgia
- Mother: Martha
- Religion: Georgian Orthodox Church

There was also a Giorgi I, Catholicos of Kartli who ruled in 677–678.

George I (Georgian: გიორგი I, romanized: giorgi I; 998 or 1002 – 16 August 1027), of the Bagrationi dynasty, was the 2nd king (mepe) of the Kingdom of Georgia from 1014 until his death in 1027.

George I, who ascended the throne at a young age and could not yet match the stature of his father Bagrat III, first faced a defeat at the hands of the nobles, who forced him to recognize the renewed independence of Kakheti-Hereti. However, he soon managed to regain strength and expanded his influence throughout the region, acquiring numerous vassals in North Caucasus and establishing a genuine, though short-lived, sphere of influence in Armenia.

The Byzantine Empire, with which his father had already experienced growing tensions, proved powerful enough to confront him in a conflict initiated by George during the reign of Basil II. This war devastated the southern regions of Georgia and resulted in the annexation of the former Kingdom of the Iberians, Tao.

Nevertheless, through skillful diplomacy—including an alliance with the Fatimids—George succeeded in preserving the independence of his realm. Under his rule, Georgia remained free from vassalage and paid no tribute to any foreign power.

== Early life ==
George was born in either 998 or 1002, probably in Abkhazia or in Iberia (western Georgia), the domains of his father, Bagrat III, who had already begun his work of unifying the Georgian lands. Through his father, George was the adoptive grandson of the powerful David III Kurapalates, the principal architect of Georgian unification, and the biological grandson of Gurgen of Iberia, the last ruler to hold the title King of the Georgians. From these two ancestral lines, George inherited the legacy of the ancient and prominent Bagrationi dynasty, a dynasty that ruled most of the ten or so Georgian states prior to 1010.

As noted earlier, in the year 1010, after a two-year war, Kvirike III, ruler of Kakheti and Hereti, was finally defeated, and his domains were annexed, bringing about the long-sought unification of Georgia. George’s father thus became one of the most powerful monarchs in the Caucasus, reducing the Emirate of Ganja to vassalage and, according to Georgian charters, extending his authority over the Armenian territories as well as all the Caucasian tribes of North Caucasus. However, Bagrat III died four years later, on 7 May 1014. His only son and heir, George, then about eighteen years old, was ascended to the throne.

== Reign ==
=== Kakheti crisis ===
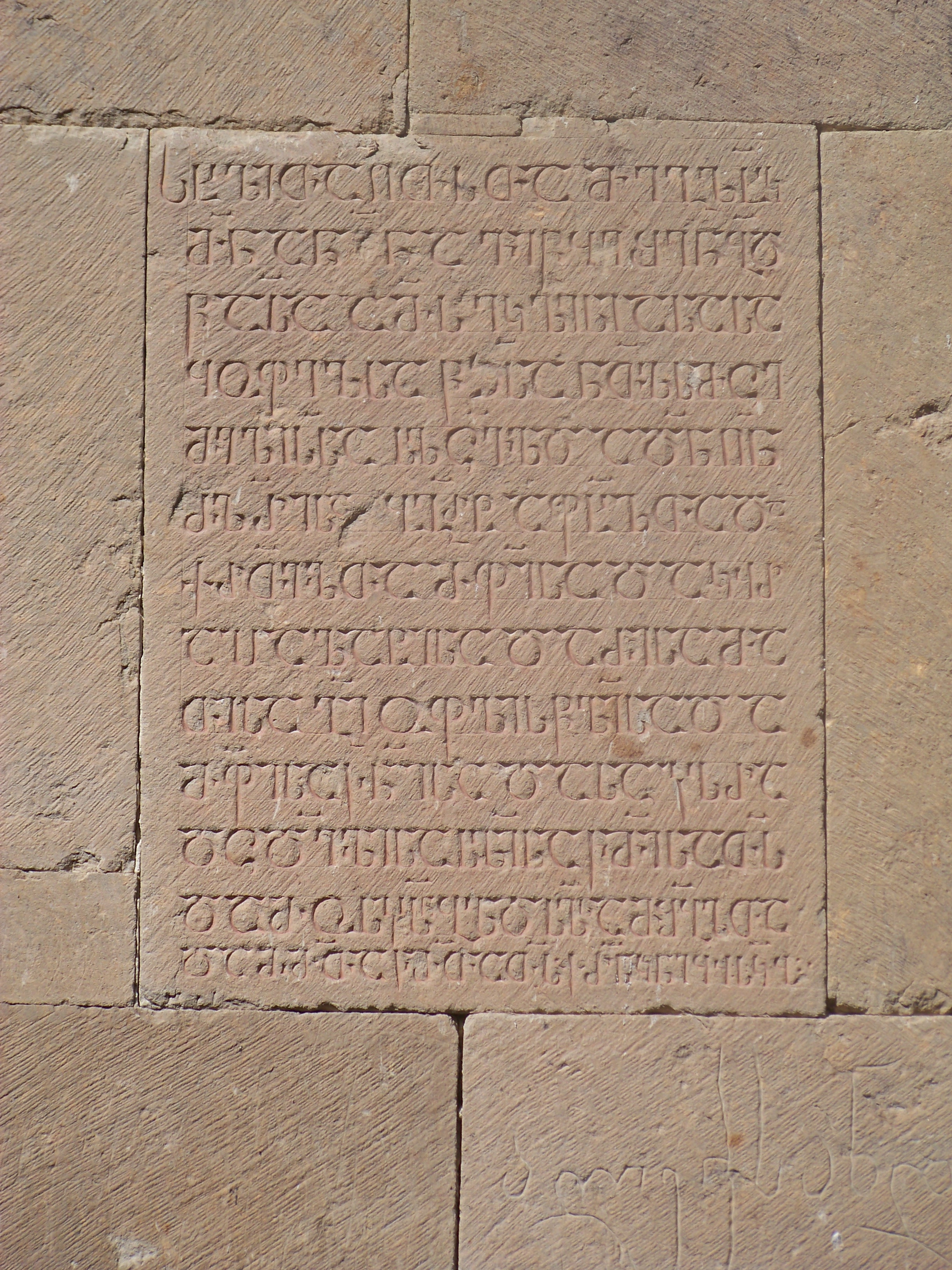
Inscription of Khtsisi John the Baptist church, mentioning Prince George

The new king, George I, was therefore largely inexperienced in political affairs, unlike his father, owing to his young age. At eighteen, the monarch had not yet acquired sufficient knowledge of the complex issue of the nobility, yet he was already too old for the appointment of a regent—or even a highly influential advisor—without risking becoming the puppet of some powerful lord motivated only by his own aristocratic allies. For this reason, George was unable to prevent the first crisis of his reign, which erupted between the crown and the nobility. This class, representing the former Georgian high aristocracy from before unification, chose to target the most vulnerable region of the kingdom, one that had joined last and under difficult circumstances: Kakheti.

The aznauri (lords), described as “treacherous” by the Georgian Chronicles, had lived in comfortable conditions when Kakheti was an independent kingdom, but were exiled to western Georgia by King Bagrat III in 1010. They rebelled against royal authority and the unity of the country. Upon returning to their homeland, they (whose names remain unknown) seized and took hostage the local governors (eristavi, meaning “grand duke”) appointed by Georgia, demanding the restoration of an independent Kakheti similar to that which had existed until 1010. Taken by surprise, King George I had no choice but to comply with the nobles’ demands. In an agreement that deprived Georgia of more than a third of its territory within the first year of his reign, he recognized the independence of Kakheti and released the former chorepiscopus Kvirike III, who assumed the title of “King of Kakheti and Hereti.”

As a consequence, King George I was obliged to remove the title of Ranis and Kakhetians from his father’s former royal title, retaining only that of “King of the Abkhazians and Iberians.”

However, it cannot truly be said that Kvirike III saw himself as anything other than a Georgian monarch. Both he and his people continued to depend on the Georgian Orthodox Church, with only a de facto independent bishop residing in Alaverdi. Despite any claims to the contrary, the Georgian language remained in common use among the Kakhetians. Politically, Kvirike later became an ally of Georgia against two shared enemies—the Alans, who lived on the northern slopes of the Greater Caucasus, and the Shaddadids—beginning as early as the reign of George I’s successor, Bagrat IV.

Why, then, did George I deprive his kingdom of a third of its territory when Kvirike considered himself an ally of the same culture and faith? The true reason remains uncertain. However, historian Nodar Assatiani proposed a theory that may explain the Kakhetian–Georgian affair: either the young Georgian king reached an agreement with the Kakhetian nobility and took advantage of Kakheti’s diplomatic isolation to ally himself with Alaverdi, or George I voluntarily granted the region to Kvirike III in order to avoid a Byzantine invasion and the devastation of that area.

=== Georgia's regional power ===
Kingdom of Georgia in 1014

When Bagrat III died in 1014, Georgia could rightly be considered the leading power of the Caucasus. Few others could lay claim to that title. To the north, nearly all the nomadic tribes and peoples who once sought to form “countries” had already fallen under the suzerainty of the first ruler of unified Georgia, though some groups—such as the Alans—remained de facto beyond the jurisdiction of Georgia. To the east, as previously mentioned, neither the Kingdom of Kakheti-Hereti nor the Emirate of Ganja—still paying tribute at the time—posed a threat to Georgia; one was regarded as an ally, the other a vassal. In the south, only the Kingdom of Armenia matched Georgia’s military strength.

King Gagik I Shahanshah had ruled the Armenian kingdom since 989. Both Armenian and foreign chronicles describe him as a strong and powerful monarch in the region, comparable in prestige to David Kuropalates. However, he died nearly thirty years later, in 1020, believing he had left behind a firmly established realm for his descendants. His eldest son and designated heir, Hovhannes-Smbat III, proved far less capable than his father, provoking the anger of his younger brother Ashot, known as the Valiant. Ashot rebelled and, without extensive warfare, succeeded in carving out an independent principality in northeastern Armenia in 1021. Senekerim-Hovhannes, King of Vaspurakan, cleverly positioned himself as mediator between the two brothers to prevent a civil war that could invite Byzantine intervention. Yet no lasting resolution emerged, and he remained the most prominent figure in Armenia.

At this point, George I of Georgia entered the scene. Replacing Senekerim-Hovhannes as arbiter, he proposed a genuine settlement: dividing the lands of Gagik I, he granted the region of Ani to Hovhannes-Smbat III, while Ashot received the territories situated between Georgia and the Abbasid Caliphate. However, a minor incident soon broke the agreement. According to Aristakes Lastivertsi, Ashot became enraged upon learning that his brother, on his journey to Ani, had stopped overnight at Chatik—territory belonging to Ashot. He sent envoys to George I, who decided to “come to his aid”.

The Georgian king marched to Ani, encountered no resistance, seized the city, and plundered and destroyed it. Subsequently, nobles loyal to Gagik I’s legitimate successor defected and handed Hovhannes-Smbat over to George, who released him in exchange for several fortresses and Ani’s formal vassalage. Georgia now stood as the foremost power in the Caucasus. Yet this was not enough for George: he sought not only titles, but new lands. Having apparently recovered from the earlier loss of eastern Georgia, he was ready to confront a far greater adversary.

=== War with the Byzantine Empire ===
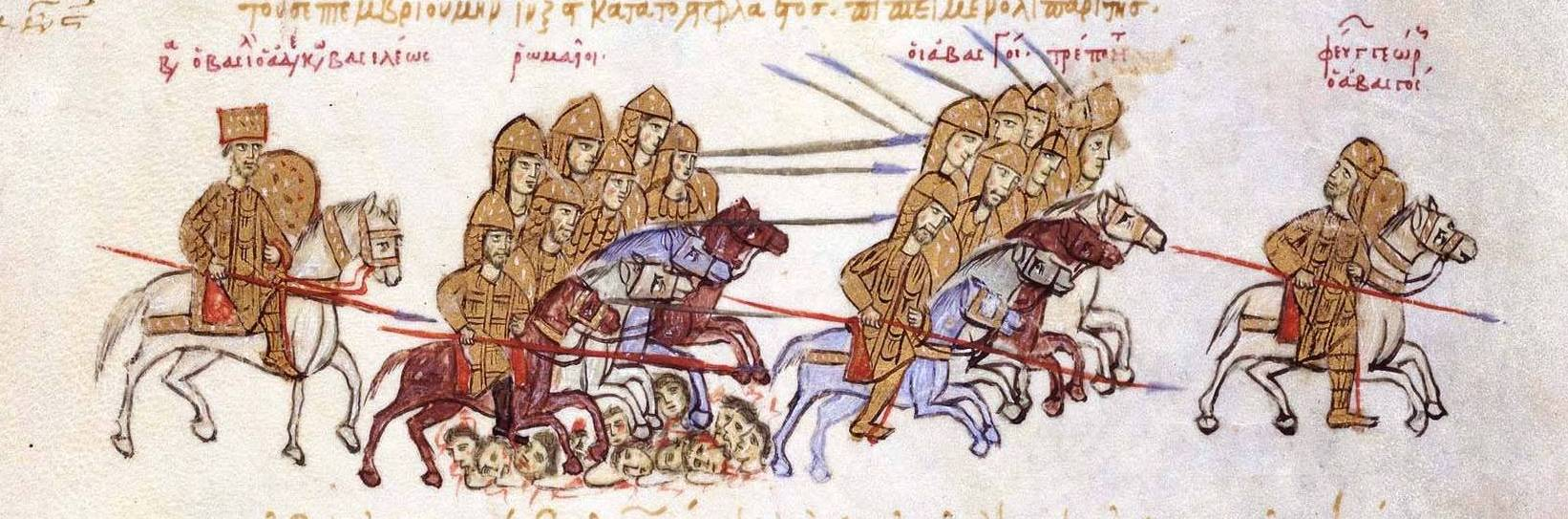
A miniature depicting the defeat of King George I at the Battle of Shirimni. The Skylitzes Chronicle. George is shown as fleeing on horseback on the right and Basil II holding a shield and lance on the left.

Still young and proud of his early achievements, George I decided to rekindle the old tensions between his kingdom and the Byzantine Empire, which had pursued imperialist ambitions in the Caucasus region since at least the reign of Justinian (527–565). Considering himself the true successor of those who sought to unite the Georgian lands, the loss of Kakheti and Hereti drove him to seek new territories in the southwest. He set his sights on Tao, the former Kingdom of the Iberians and hereditary domain of the early Bagrationi dynasty. This region had been bequeathed by testament to Emperor Basil II by David III Kurapalates as a form of punishment for the latter’s support of the rebel Bardas Phokas; part of it had later been granted by Byzantine to Bagrat III.

Since the year 1000, Basil II had been fully engaged in a long and brutal war against the Bulgarians—earning him the epithet Bulgar Slayer—and thus had little time to concern himself with Georgia. Taking advantage of this, George I invaded the disputed territory for the first time in 1015 or 1016, without provoking an immediate military response from the emperor. However, Aristakes Lastivertsi reports a written exchange between Basil and the Georgian monarch, in which the emperor declared:

“—Abandon the portion of the Kuropalate’s inheritance that I granted to your father, and be content to reign over your own patrimony.”
“—Of what my father possessed, I will not yield a single house to anyone.”

Following this defiance, Basil II personally intervened despite his ongoing difficulties in Bulgaria. Yet the renewed alliance between Georgia and Byzantium’s principal rival, the Fatimid Caliphate—against which Basil had waged war between 992 and 995—initially repelled the Greek forces.

By 1018, however, Bulgaria had been completely subdued by Byzantine arms: Tsar Presian II was deposed, and his kingdom was made a province of the Byzantine Empire. Soon after, the Fatimid Caliph al-Hakim bi-Amr Allah died and was succeeded by his inexperienced son, Ali az-Zahir, who proved too weak to maintain any focus on Georgian affairs. Left isolated on the international stage, George I now faced the full might of the Byzantine army.

The two forces met on the plains of Basiani, in Tao. George retreated, burning the town of Oltisi to block the Greek advance, but was overtaken at Kola. Nearby, at the village of Shirimni, the Georgian rearguard was attacked by the Byzantine vanguard, leading to a fierce battle on 11 September 1021. The engagement was narrowly won by Basil II’s troops, with the emperor himself present on the battlefield, though many of Georgia’s greatest generals perished.

The Georgian army hastily withdrew toward Samtskhe, pursued by the Byzantines, who ravaged Javakheti and set fire to the city of Artaani.

A pursuit ensued following the initial encounters. From Samtskhe, upon sighting the approach of enemy forces, King George I withdrew to the region of Trialeti. Once there, he prevented the Byzantine troops from catching up, while his own army was reinforced by soldiers from Kakheti-Hereti and the mountains of the Greater Caucasus. Emperor Basil II, in turn, retreated and spent the winter at Artaani, using the season to devastate the surrounding regions in retaliation. Later, he established his camp within imperial territory near Trebizond, where he received the submission of Hovhannes-Smbat III of Armenia—a vassal of Georgia—and initiated the first attempts at negotiation with the Georgian kingdom. Around the same time, Vaspurakan was ceded to Byzantium by King Senekerim-Hovhannes, who sought protection from the advancing Seljuks. Surrounded on all sides, Georgia found itself in a precarious position and, as a last resort, intervened in the internal affairs of the Byzantine Empire.

In 1022, the strategos of Anatolia, Nikephoros Xiphias—a distinguished Byzantine general who had previously fought in the war against the Bulgarians—rose in rebellion alongside his namesake, Nikephoros Phokas (nicknamed “the Twisted-Neck”), son of the former rebel Bardas Phokas. Together, they opposed Emperor Basil II. Officially, their revolt stemmed from their exclusion from the Caucasian campaign; however, in reality, the rebellion was instigated by George I, who exploited the envy and resentment of the Byzantine generals. On 11 September 1022, exactly one year after the Georgian defeat at Shirimni, Basil II decisively crushed the revolt and brought the rebels to Constantinople. Realizing the Georgian monarch’s involvement, Basil once again turned his forces against Georgia, compelling George I to sue for peace.

George attempted to recover from this setback by sending Prince Zviad Liparitisdze with a large contingent to meet the Byzantine emperor. During the winter of 1022–1023, he seized the opportunity to reoccupy Tao. Acting on the treacherous counsel of several Georgian nobles, George I ordered an attack on the imperial troops. Personally leading his army onto the plain of Basiani, he engaged the Byzantines in a fierce and bloody battle. The Greek division of the enemy army was routed, yet the contingents from the Kievan Rus’ continued their assault with great tenacity, ultimately defeating the Georgian forces. Many Georgian nobles and soldiers fell in battle.

Peace negotiations resumed soon afterward, resulting in a treaty between Basil II and George I. Under its terms, the young prince Bagrat, the king’s eldest son—then three years old—was sent to Constantinople as a hostage for three years. Georgia was also compelled to cede fourteen fortresses and to renounce all claims to the territories of David Kuropalates. Consequently, Georgia lost control over Tao, Javakheti, Shavsheti, the plains of Basiani, and the towns of Artaani and Kola. The first Byzantine–Georgian war thus concluded with a decisive Byzantine victory.

=== End of the reign and death ===
Two years after the end of the war, Basil II died on December 15, 1025. His brother Constantine VIII succeeded him on the imperial throne, just as the three-year period during which Crown Prince Bagrat was to remain in Constantinople had come to an end. Constantine didn't see it that way, however, and asked the catapan of Iberia, Nikita, to take back the six-year-old Bagrat, who was still on Georgian territory. The catapan Nikita tried to recover the prince by force, but it was already too late: an innumerable Georgian army, ready for battle to defend the future king, stood in front of him.

Later, the Catholicos-Patriarch of All Georgia Melchizedek I (c. 1010 - 1033) traveled in Constantinople for what can be considered the first discussions between Byzantium and Georgia since the end of the war. There, as his country's ambassador to the empire, he bought the Tao villages of Zadvareki, Orota and another whose name is unknown. In Shavsheti, Naghvarevi was also taken, as were Tontio in Javakheti, Orotan in the Kola region, Makharovani in Phanavari and Nakalakevi and Berdadzoni in Sacoeti. All these lands were later assigned to the Georgian Orthodox Church.

Two more years later, on August 16, 1027, King George I died while traveling in the Trialeti region, in the village of Mkinvarni (also known as Itsroni or Vironi). He was buried in the Bagrati Cathedral in his capital Kutaisi. A recently discovered grave, presumably robbed in the 19th century, is proposed to have belonged to George I. According to the Georgian Chronicles, the whole country mourned him, for during his reign he had surpassed all his ancestors in every possible quality. His son, then aged seven, was recognized and proclaimed King of Georgia, under the name of Bagrat IV.

== Heritage ==
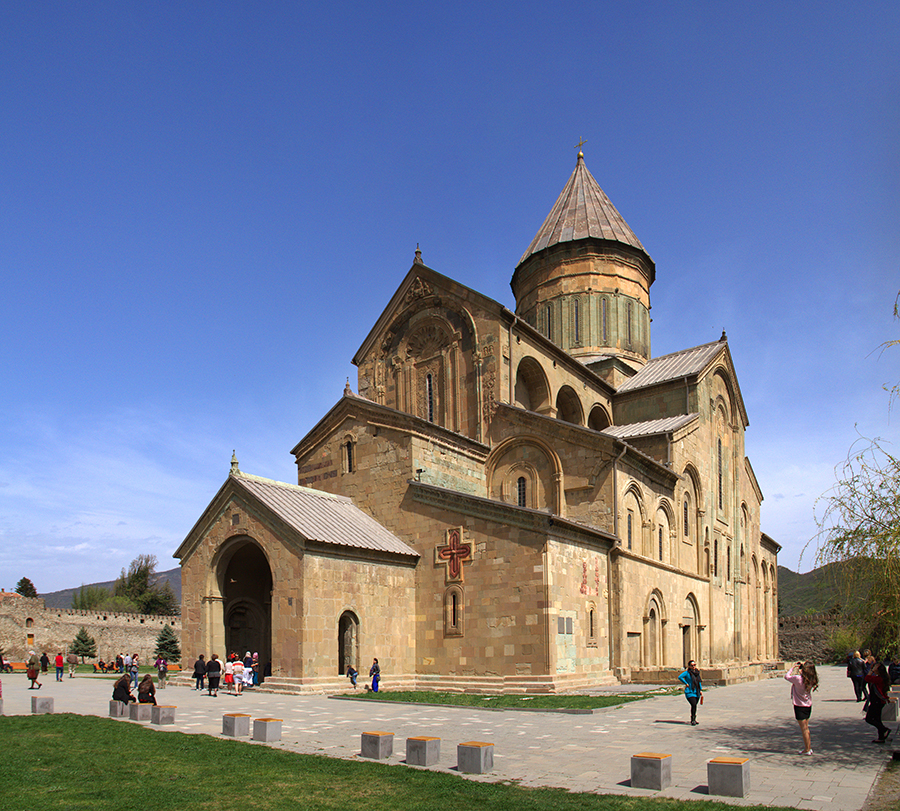
The construction of Svetitskhoveli Cathedral in Mtskheta, now a UNESCO World Heritage Site, was initiated in the 1020s by George I.

When King George I died, he left a dubious legacy. On the one hand, he let a third of his territories fall into the hands of the nobles, but diplomatically, he truly outdid his father, turning the man who was supposed to be his closest enemy (Kvirike III of Kakheti) into a loyal ally who helped him in his future campaigns. Diplomatically, he also succeeded in taking control of the internal affairs of his Armenian neighbor, but also made alliances that enabled him to avoid a first invasion by Byzantium. However, the same enemy defied all these dangers to invade southwestern Georgia in 1021-1023. But this did not prevent his distant eighteenth-century descendant Vakhushti Bagrationi from venerating him to the point of praising him in the Georgian Chronicles:

" King George I died, still young and full of all sorts of qualities. No one among his ancestors had been his equal in energy, heroism, generosity, perfections of body and face, and ability to govern. He died leaving all the peoples of his royal domains in affliction, each one regretting his goodness, his heroism, his bravery."

Traces of George I's reign are few and far between. The main one is the construction of the Svetitskhoveli Cathedral on the site of the former wooden church built under the protection of the Iberian rulers Mirian III and his wife Nana, in the 4th century. From the time of George I onwards, almost all future Georgian kings were crowned in the town of Mtskheta, the former administrative and now religious capital of Georgia. Indeed, Svetistskhoveli was the official seat of the Catholicos-Patriarch of All Georgia until 2004, when it was transferred to Holy Trinity Cathedral of Tbilisi.

== Family ==
George was married twice. His first wife was Mariam, daughter of Senekerim-Hovhannes Artsruni. His second wife was Alda, daughter of the King of Alania. George's children were:

- Bagrat IV of Georgia (1018–1072), born to Mariam, King of Georgia (r. 1027–1072);
- Princess Gurandukht, born to Mariam; she married Smbat, son of David I Anhoghin;
- Princess Kata, born to Mariam; she married Abbas I of Kars;
- Princess Martha, born to Mariam; she died young;
- Prince Demetrius, born to Alda; he unsuccessfully claimed the throne.

== In literature ==
The most important representation of Giorgi I in historical fiction is probably in Konstantine Gamsakhurdia's magnum opus, The Hand of the Great Master. The author has often noted that he has been deeply interested in George's character and historical figure for a long time, as well as his reign full of turmoil and turbulence. In the story, the king is portrayed as a philanderer who enjoys feasting in low-class taverns with his comrades disguised as random peasants. The author seems to be emphasizing on the king's human, fleshly wishes and desires, despite his position on the social ladder, such as lust, love, loathing and compassion.

== Bibliography ==
- Asatiani, Nodar; Bendianashvili, Alexandre (1997). Histoire de la Géorgie. Paris: L'Harmattan. ISBN 2-7384-6186-7.
- Asatiani, Nodar; Janelidze, Otar (2009). History of Georgia. Tbilisi: Publishing House Petite. ISBN 978-9941-9063-6-7.
- Brosset, Marie-Félicité (1849). Histoire de la Géorgie depuis l'Antiquité jusqu'au XIXe siècle. Volume I [History of Georgia from Ancient Times to the 19th Century, Volume 1] (in French). Saint-Petersburg: Imperial Academy of Sciences.
- Grousset, René (1995) [1947]. Histoire de l'Arménie des origines à 1071 (in French). Payot. ISBN 2-228-88912-1.
- Grousset, René (1949). L'Empire du Levant : Histoire de la Question d'Orient. Bibliothèque historique (in French). Paris: Payot. p. 153. ISBN 2-228-12530-X.
- Javakhishvili, Ivane (1949). Histoire de la Géorgie. XIe – XVe siècles (in Georgian). Tbilisi: Publication d'État de la RSS de Géorgie..
- Mikaberidze, Alexander (2015). Historical Dictionary of Georgia. Rowman & Littlefield Publishers. ISBN 9781442241466.
- Muskhelishvili, David L. (2003). A Historical Atlas of Georgia. Tbilisi: I. Javakhishvili Institute of History and Ethnology of the Academy of Sciences of Georgia.
- Salia, Kalistrat (1980). Histoire de la nation géorgienne [History of the Georgian nation] (in French). Paris: Nino Salia.

Preceded by Bagrat III	King of Georgia; 1014–1027	Succeeded by Bagrat IV
