= The Right Hand of the Grand Master =

1939 novel by Konstantine Gamsakhurdia

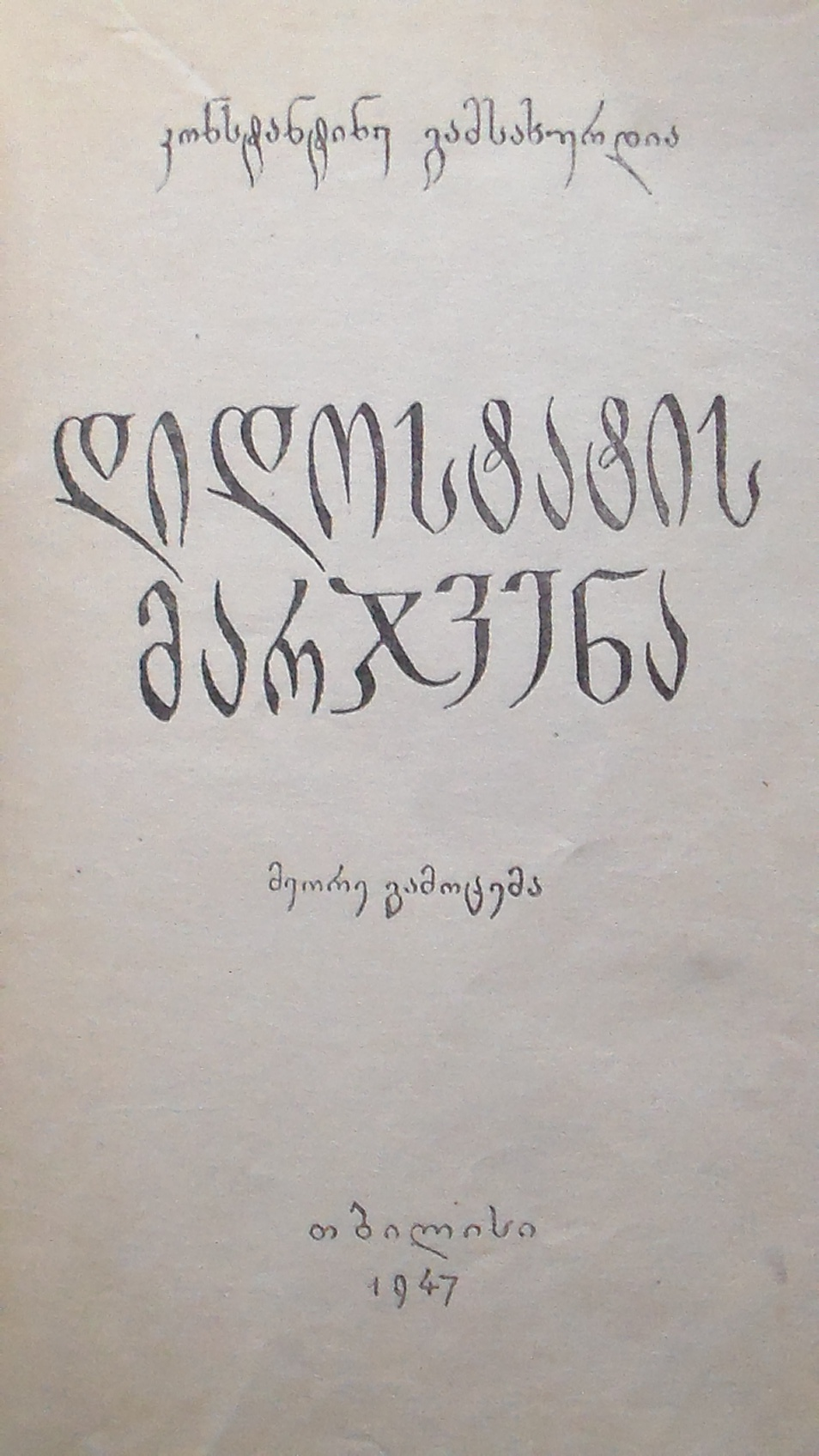
- Author: Konstantine Gamsakhurdia
- Original title: დიდოსტატის კონსტანტინეს მარჯვენა
- Translator: Vakhtang Eristavi (to English)
- Language: Georgian
- Genre: Historical fiction, historical romance, Modernist novel
- Published: March 31, 1939
- Publication place: Georgia
- Pages: 397
- ISBN: 978-9941-422-77-5

The Right Hand of the Grand Master (Georgian: დიდოსტატის კონსტანტინეს მარჯვენა, The Right Hand of the Grand Master Constantine), also published as The Hand of the Great Master is a historical novel by 20th century Georgian writer Konstantine Gamsakhurdia, who first published it in 1939 in a literary magazine Mnatobi. Subtitled a "knightly novel" by the author, the book received much critical acclaim in Georgia and in the Soviet Union as a whole, selling 700,000 copies of 12 publications of its Russian-translated version in the author's lifetime alone. A two-episode feature film The Right Hand of the Grand Master based on the novel and directed by Vakhtang Tabliashvili and Devi Abashidze was premiered in 1969.

== Plot ==
The story is based on the partially legendary story of renovation of Svetitskhoveli Cathedral in 1010s Kingdom of Georgia by a young enigmatic architect Arsukidze (stylized as Constantine Arsakidze in the book). It is set during the 11th century and tells of the reign of King George I. George has a host of problems. The most immediate one is that the various mountain tribes, including, in particular, the Pkhovi (Pshavi and Khevsureti), periodically revolt. George is (nominally) Christian. Though he professes the faith and his wife, Mariam, is an enthusiastic builder of churches, he is not as fully committed as either Mariam or the catholicos Melkisedek would have liked, not being averse, for example, to making an alliance with the Saracens when it is convenient. The Pkhovi and other mountain tribes have partially converted to Christianity but are even less enthusiastic than King George and several times during this novel, they destroy churches, imprison and kill priests and put back their pagan idols. At the start of the novel, Lord Mamamze is visiting King George though we soon know and King George soon suspects that he is there more to spy on the king, to see how he will react to the latest rebellion of the mountain tribes. Mamamze has long been a friend and ally of King George, so his rebellion is disappointing. George has other problems. Tbilisi is occupied by the Arabs and there is a continual war in Georgia . He is also at war with the Byzantines under Emperor Basil II, who has taken King George's son, Bagrat (the future Bagrat IV) hostage. But we start with the mountain tribes. Mamamze's son, Chiaberi, seems to be a major part of the rebellion, as is Talagva Kolonkelidze, Dukeof Kvetari, and father of Shorena, who is engaged to Chiaberi. The archbishop is sent to Mamamze's castle where he persuades the assembled lords to recognize Christianity and gets Chiaberi to kiss the cross, which he does reluctantly. When Chiaberi dies soon afterwards, there is a suspicion that the cross has been poisoned in some way. With the aid of his general Zviad, King George is able to put the rebellion down and punishes some of the rebels and pardons others. The rebels will revolt twice more during the book, even though, after the second time, Talagva Kolonkelidze will have his eyes put out and others will suffer the same punishment or be executed. King George, prompted by his wife and the archbishop, is a keen builder of churches, a task made more difficult by regular earthquakes. His chief architect is Parsman the Persian, who is not Persian. Parsman has had a colourful life. He was originally Georgian but when his father was killed after revolting against the king (father and predecessor of George I, — Bagrat III), he traveled the world and picked up various languages and religions, hence his nickname. He has faced many difficulties and always managed to survive as he will do in the book when he faces death more than once.

But though King George and his political and military problems take up most of the book, the title indicates that the hero is not the King but Konstantine Arsakidze. King George likes to go out hunting incognito, dressed as a poor man, with his friends. They hunt, they drink and they chase women. On one occasion one of them sees what he assumes is a goblin. The others see the same goblin the next day but it turns out to be a young Laz, who is both a good hunter and a good artist. King George is having serious doubts about Parsman at the time and he appoints Konstantine to be his chief architect. He does not have Parsman's skills or ability but he does build cathedrals in the Georgian style, which Parsman does not. However, King George is unaware that Konstantine is the foster-brother of Shorena. In this context, foster-brother means that they both had the same wet nurse. In fact, this turns out not to be true, as Konstantine was the foster-brother of Shorena's older sister but as the older sister died when very young, it is Konstantine and Shorena who grew up together. Problems start when King George falls in love with Shorena while, unbeknownst to him, Shorena and Konstantine start an affair.

Gamsakhurdia tells a tale of treachery and military action, of religious clashes and bravery in battle. The themes of plague, earthquakes, wars, rebellions, and love, are present in this novel giving insight into events in the region over a thousand years ago.

== Characters ==
- George I of Georgia — King of Georgia
- Mariami — Queen of Georgia
- Melchizedek I of Georgia — Catholicos-Patriarch of All Georgia
- Konstantine Arsakisdze — Architect, Svetitskhoveli Cathedral's builder.
- Zviad — Amirspasalar
- Parsman the Persian — Chief architect
- Talagva Kolonkelidze — Eristavi
- Shorena — Talangva Kolonkelidze's daughter
- Mamamze — Eristavi
- Chiaberi — Mamamze's son
- Bordokhan — Mamamze's wife
- Vardisakhar — a concubine
- Katay — Mamamze's daughter

== Publishing history ==
The novel is translated into several languages, namely in English, Russian (Десница Великого мастера), Bengali, Ossetian, Hindi, Urdu, Chinese, Romanian (by Victor Kernbach), German (by Gertrud Pätsch - Die rechte Hand des großen Meisters), Armenian, French and other languages.

- First published in 1939 by Izdatelstvo "Zaria Vostoka"
- First English translation by Foreign Languages Publishing House, Moscow in 1955
