= Great Cathedrals (Georgian Orthodox) =

Term for Georgian cathedrals

Great Cathedrals (Georgian: დიდი კათედრალები) is a term used in historiography and architecture that refers to four large Georgian cathedrals built in the 10th and 11th centuries AD.

The first of these cathedrals was Oshki, one of the most important architectural and religious centers in the Tao-Klarjeti historical region. Second one was Svetitskhoveli, first built as a basilica in the second half of the 5th century and significantly rebuilt in 1010-1029 under the supervision of architect Arsukidze. The third Great Cathedral was the Temple of Bagrat, erected in Kutaisi during the reign of Bagrat III as the main cathedral of his kingdom and consecrated in honor of the Assumption of Mary in 1003. The last of the four Great Cathedrals was Alaverdi built in the first quarter of the 11th century.

== Gallery ==
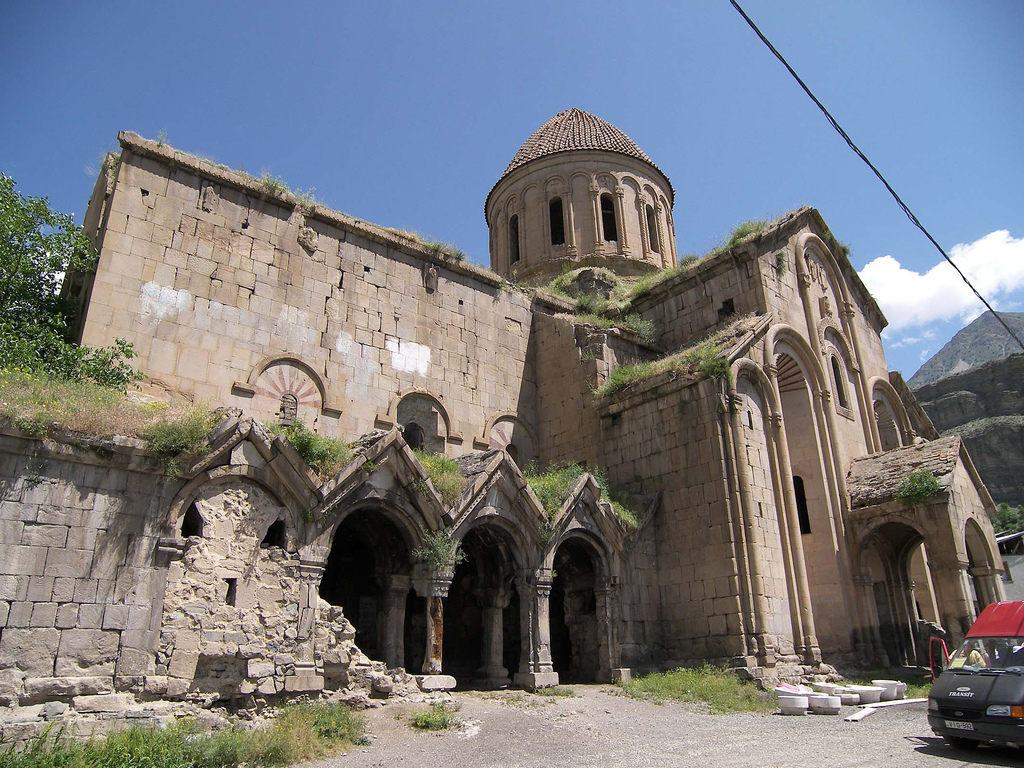
Oshki, the first Cathedral, circa 963-973

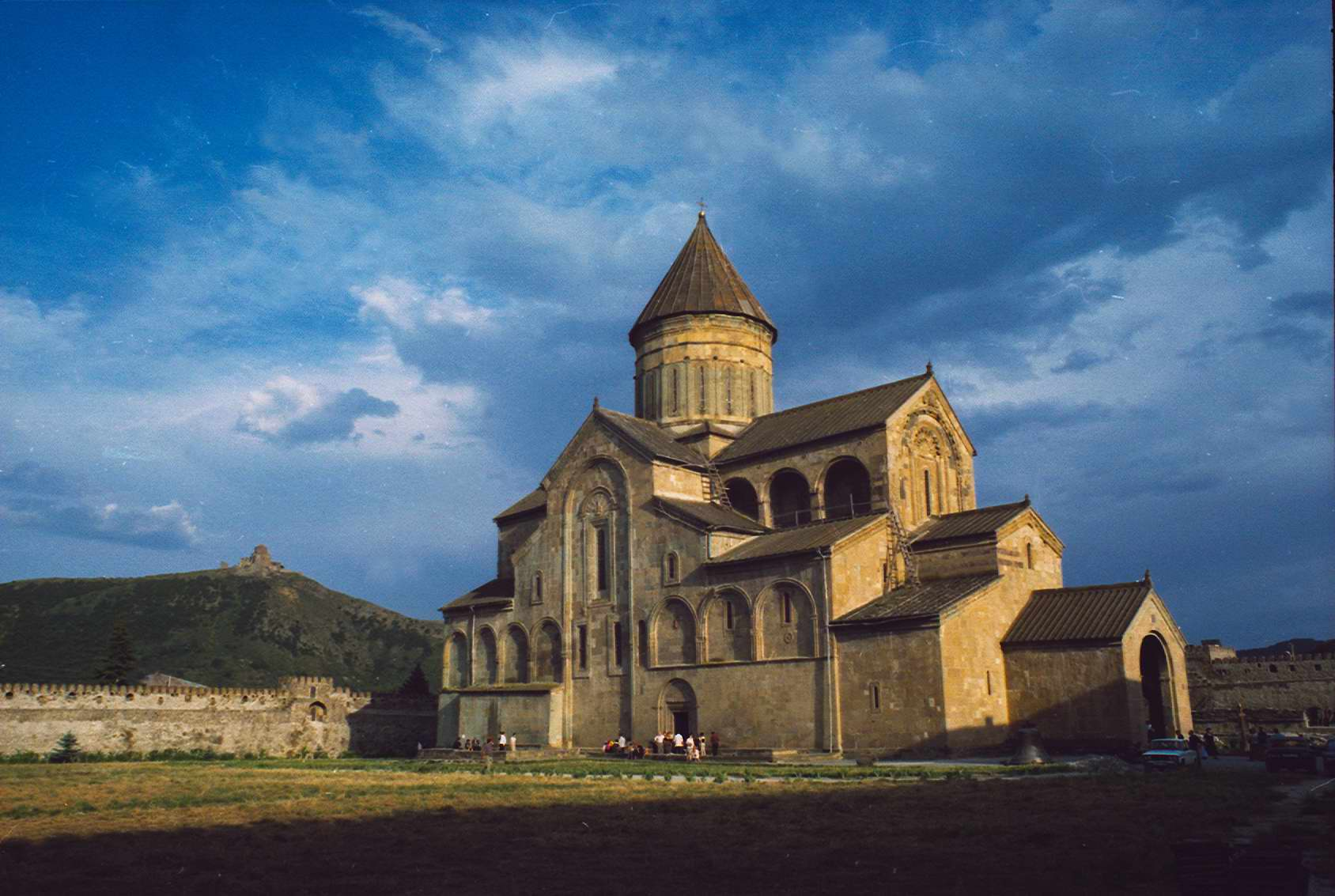
Svetitskhoveli, the second Cathedral, 1010-1029

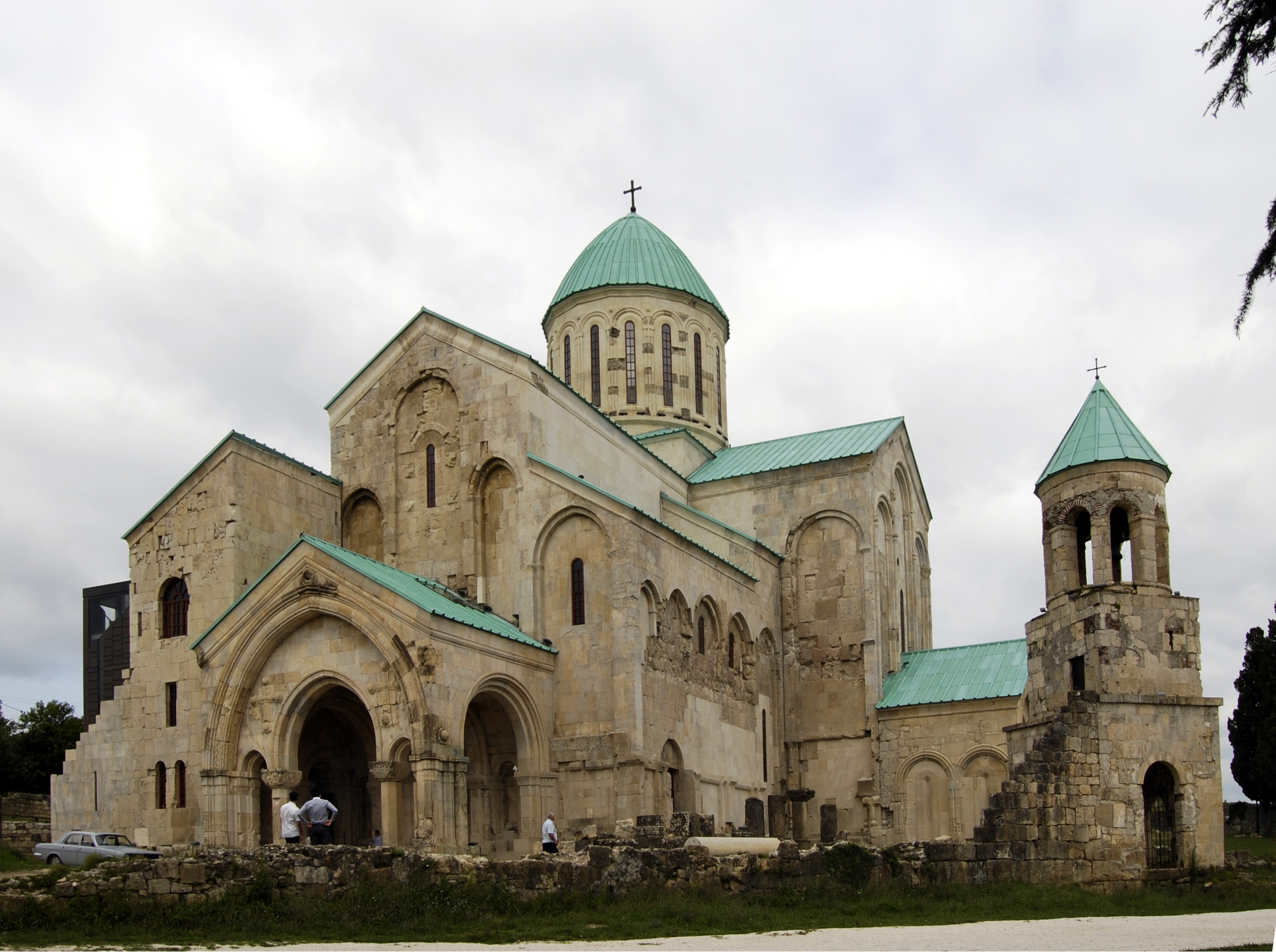
Bagrati, the third Cathedral, 1003

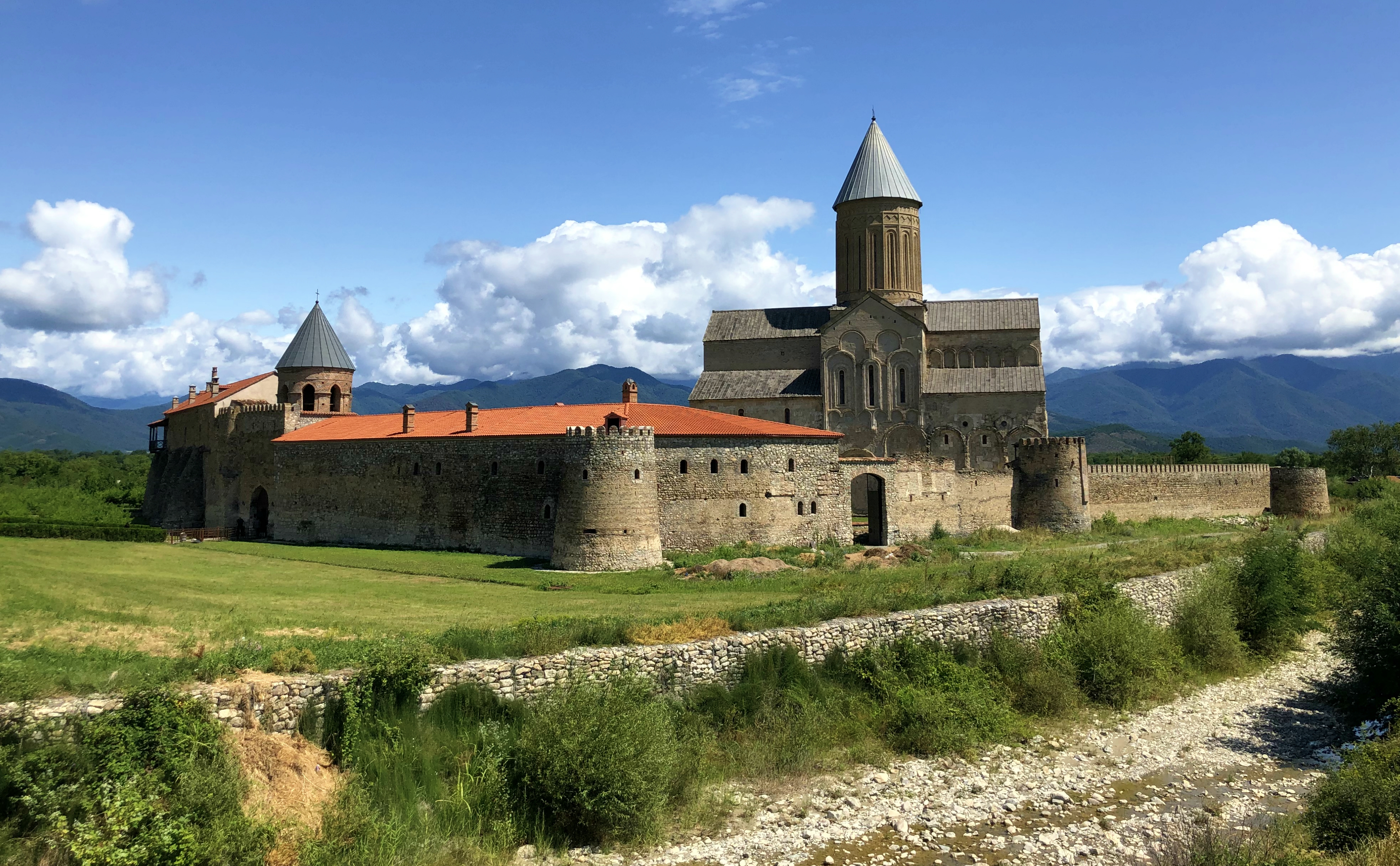
Alaverdi, the 4th Cathedral, first quarter of the 11th century
