= Alaverdi Monastery =

Georgian Orthodox monastery near Akhmeta, Georgia

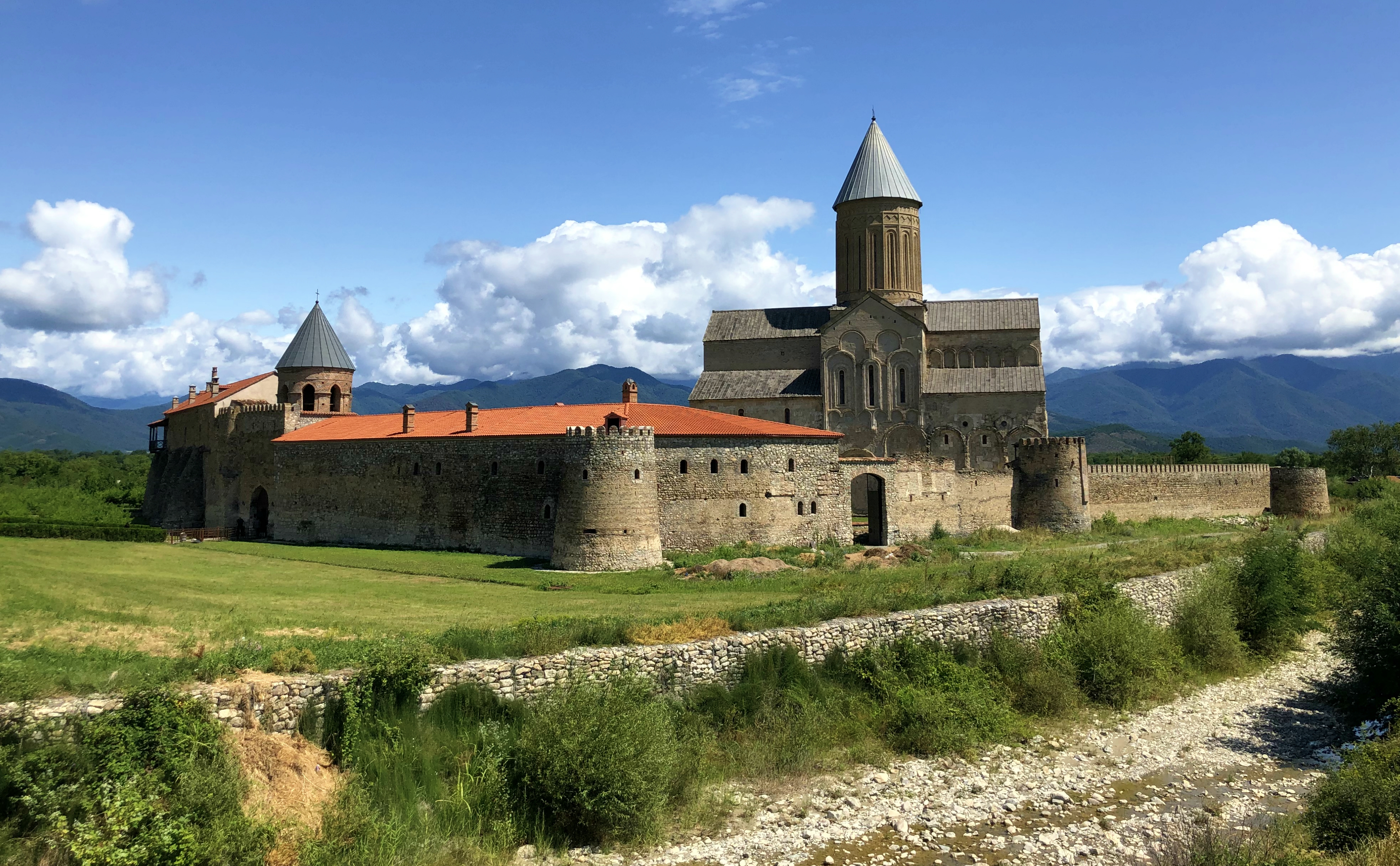
- Alaverdi Monastery

- Location within Georgia Location within Kakheti

Religion
- Affiliation: Georgian Orthodox Church
- Region: South Caucasus

Location
- Location: 25 km from Akhmeta, Kakheti Province (Mkhare), Georgia
- Coordinates: 42.032497°N 45.377108°E

Architecture
- Style: Georgian; Monastery
- Founder: Monk Joseph (Yoseb, Amba) Alaverdeli
- Funded by: Kvirike III of Kakheti
- Completed: 6th-11th centuries

Alaverdi Monastery (Georgian: ალავერდის მონასტერი, romanized: alaverdis monast'eri) is a Georgian Eastern Orthodox monastery located 25 km (16 mi) from Akhmeta, in the Kakheti region of Eastern Georgia. While parts of the monastery date back to 6th century, the present day Cathedral of Saint George was built in the 11th century by Kvirike III of Kakheti, replacing an older church of St. George. It is considered one of the four Great Cathedrals of the Georgian Orthodox world.

== History ==
The monastery was founded by the Assyrian monk Joseph (Yoseb, Amba) Alaverdeli, who came from Antioch and settled in Alaverdi, then a small village and former pagan religious center dedicated to the Moon. At a height of over 55 m (180 ft), Alaverdi Cathedral was the tallest religious building in Georgia, until the construction of the Holy Trinity Cathedral of Tbilisi, which was consecrated in 2004. However its overall size is smaller than the cathedral of Svetitskhoveli in Mtskheta. The monastery is the focus of the annual religious celebration Alaverdoba. Situated in the heart of the world's oldest wine region, the monks also make their own wine, known as Alaverdi Monastery Cellar. The cellar has been dated to between the 10th and 12th centuries.

== Burials ==
- Ketevan of Kakheti
- Teimuraz I of Kakheti

== See also ==
- Kvetera Church
- Matani monastery
- Bakhtrioni
