= Konstantine Gamsakhurdia =

(1893–1975) Georgian writer

Konstantine Gamsakhurdia კონსტანტინე გამსახურდია
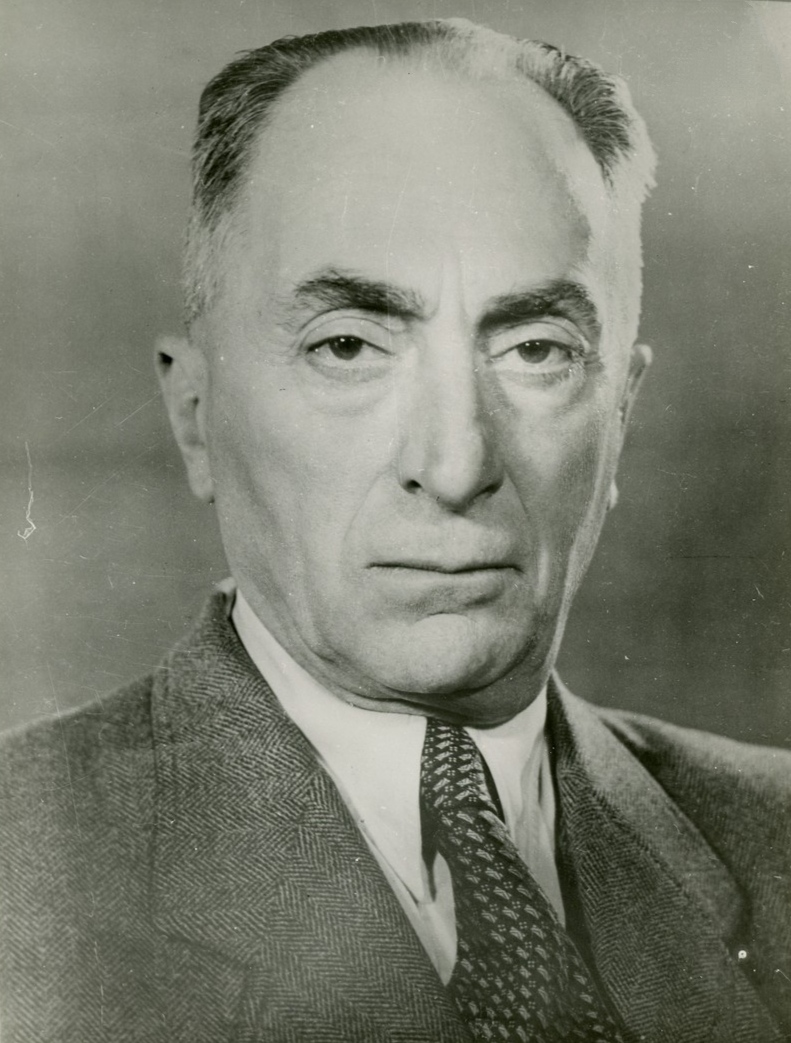
- Born: May 3, 1893; Abasha, Kutais Governorate, Russian Empire
- Died: July 17, 1975 (aged 82); Tbilisi, Georgian SSR, Soviet Union
- Occupations: writer, poet, social activist
- Spouse: Miranda Palavandishvili
- Children: Zviad Gamsakhurdia
- Writing career
- Language: Georgian
- Notable works: "The Right Hand of the Grand Master" "The Abduction of the Moon" "Dionysus' smile"
- Notable awards: Order of Lenin; Order of the Red Banner of Labour; Shota Rustaveli Prize
- Movements: Expressionism, Literary modernism

Konstantine Gamsakhurdia (Georgian: კონსტანტინე გამსახურდია, romanized: k'onst'ant'ine gamsakhurdia) (May 3, 1893 – July 17, 1975) was a Georgian writer and public figure. Educated and first published in Germany, he married Western European influences to purely Georgian thematic to produce his best works, such as The Right Hand of the Grand Master and David the Builder. Hostile to the Soviet rule, he was, nevertheless, one of the few leading Georgian writers to have survived the Stalin-era repressions, despite exile to a White Sea island and several arrests. His works are noted for their character portrayals of great psychological insight. Another major feature of Gamsakhurdia's writings is a new subtlety he infused into Georgian diction, imitating an archaic language to create a sense of classicism.

Konstantine Gamsakhurdia's son, Zviad, became a Soviet-era dissident who was subsequently elected the first President of Georgia in 1991, but died under suspicious circumstances in the civil war in 1993.

== Early life and career ==
Young Gamsakhurdia, 1923

Born into a petty noble family in Abasha, in the western Georgian province of Mingrelia, then under Imperial Russian rule, Gamsakhurdia received his early education at the Kutaisi gymnasium and then studied in St. Petersburg, where he quarrelled with Nicholas Marr. He spent most of the First World War years in Germany, France, and Switzerland, taking his doctorate at Berlin University in 1918. As a Russian subject, he was briefly interned at Traunstein in Bavaria, where Thomas Mann sent him chocolate. Gamsakhurdia published his first poems and short stories early in the 1910s, influenced by German Expressionism and by French Post-Symbolist literature. While in Germany, he regularly wrote for the German press on Georgia and the Caucasus, and was involved in organising a Georgian Liberation Committee. After Georgia's declaration of independence in 1918, he became an attaché at Georgia's embassy in Berlin, responsible for the repatriation of Georgian First World War prisoners and placing Georgian students in German universities.

Gamsakhurdia met the 1921 Bolshevik takeover of Georgia with hostility. He edited Tbilisi-based literary journals and, for a short time, led an 'academic group' of writers which placed artistic values above political correctness. Gamsakhurdia published his writings in defiance of growing ideological pressure, and went on to lead a peaceful protest rally on the anniversary of Georgia's forcible Sovietization in 1922. In 1925, Gamsakhurdia published his first and one of his most impressive novels, The Smile of Dionysus (დიონისოს ღიმილი), which took him eight years to write. It tells the tale of a young Georgian intellectual in Paris who is detached from his native society and remains a complete stranger in the city of his ideals. This novel, like his earlier works, was partially 'Decadent' and did not please the Soviet ideologists, who suspected Gamsakhurdia of fostering discontent.

== Later life and works ==
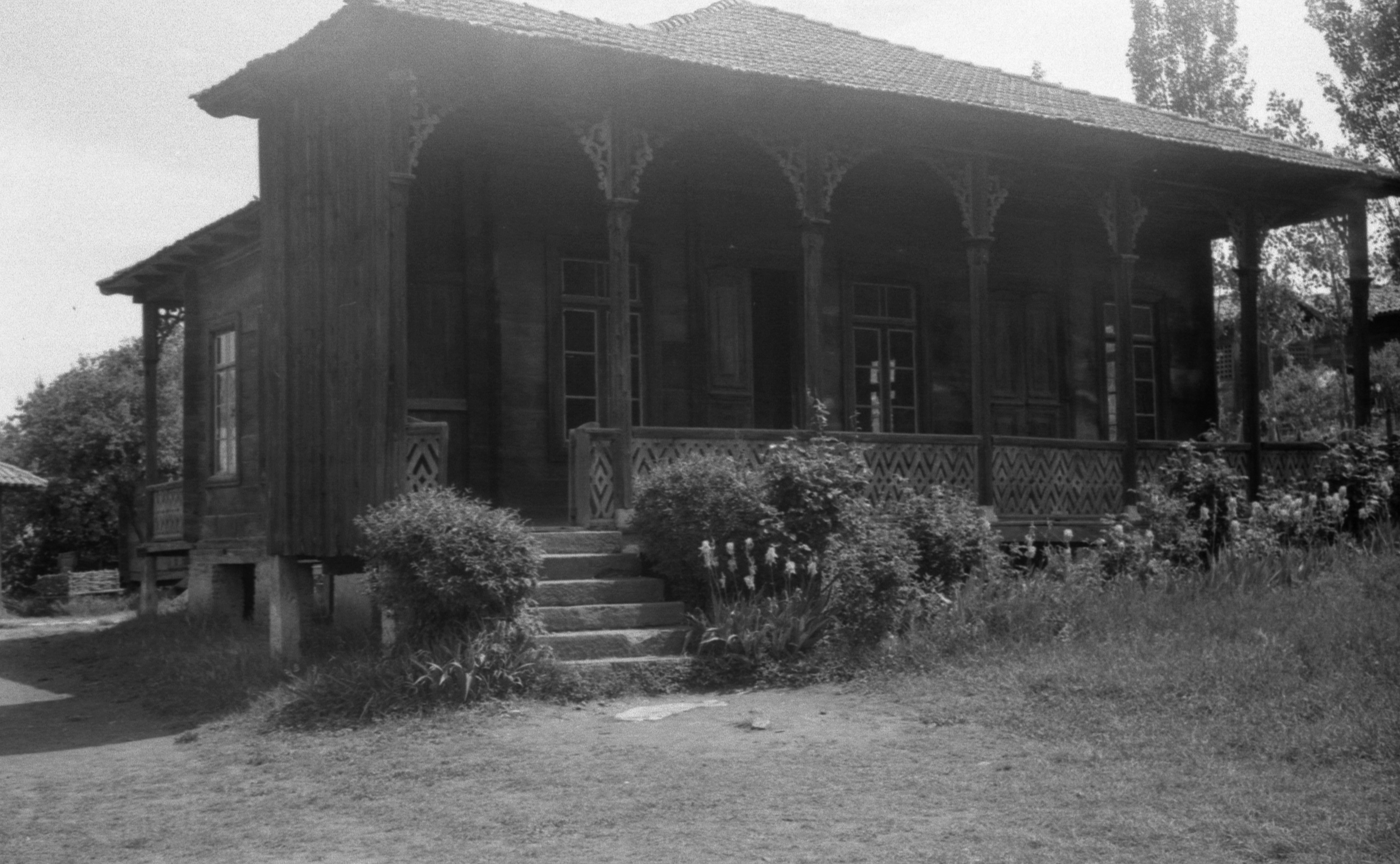
Home of Gamsakhurdia in Abasha

After the suppression of the 1924 anti-Soviet uprising in Georgia, Gamsakhurdia was excluded from Tbilisi State University, where he taught German literature. He was soon arrested and deported to the Solovetsky Islands in the White Sea, where he was to spend a few years. On his release, Gamsakhurdia was forced to keep silent. On the verge of suicide, the writer fought his depression by translating Dante. Early in the 1930s, he obtained Lavrentiy Beria's protection and was able to resume writing, with an attempt at a 'socialist' novel, Stealing the Moon (მთვარის მოტაცება, 1935–6), a story of love and collectivisation in Abkhazia. Next came the psychological novella Khogais Mindia (ხოგაის მინდია, 1937), yet another appeal in classical Georgian literature to this Khevsur myth. Beria was critical of these works, though. Soon Gamsakhurdia was arrested for an affair with Lida Gasviani, a young charming Trotskyist director of the State Publishing House, but was interrogated and released by Beria, who told him ironically that sexual relations with enemies of the people were permitted.

Gamsakhurdia survived the Joseph Stalin–Lavrentiy Beria purges, which destroyed a large part of Georgian literary society, but resolutely refused to denounce others. He had to pay tribute to the Stalinist dogma, conceiving a novel on Stalin's childhood in 1939. However, as the first published part of this work was not approved by the authorities, it was promptly discontinued and withdrawn from public libraries.

At the height of the Stalinist terror, Gamsakhurdia turned to the more favoured genre of historical and patriotic prose, embarking on his magnum opus, the novel The Right Hand of the Grand Master (დიდოსტატის მარჯვენა, 1939), set in the early 11th century around the legend of the building of the Cathedral of the Living Pillar against a broad panorama of 11th-century Georgia. It deals with the tragic fate of the devoted architect Konstantine Arsakidze, from whom King Giorgi I commissions a cathedral, but Arsakidze becomes the king's rival in love for the beautiful Shorena, a daughter of the rebellious nobleman. The clash of powerful human passions, between illicit love and duty, culminates in the mutilation and execution of Arsakidze at Giorgi's behest. The story conveys a subtle allegorical message, and the harassed artists of Stalin's era can be recognised in Arsakidze.

Gamsakhurdia's major post-World War II works are The Flowering of the Vine (ვაზის ყვავილობა, 1955), which deals with a Georgian village shortly before the war, and the monumental novel David the Builder (დავით აღმაშენებელი, 1942–62), a tetralogy about the venerated king David the Builder, who ruled Georgia from 1089 to 1125. This work won for the author a prestigious Shota Rustaveli State Prize in 1965. Gamsakhurdia also wrote a biographical novel about Goethe, and literary criticism of Georgian and foreign authors. Publication of his memoirs, Flirting with Ghosts (ლანდებთან ლაციცი, 1963), and of his testament (1959) was aborted at that time.

== Death ==
He died on 17 July 1975 and was interred at his mansion, which he called a 'Colchian Tower'. He refused to be buried in the Mtatsminda Pantheon because he detested that Jesus and Judas were buried side by side there, referring to the proximity of the graves of the national writer Ilia Chavchavadze and his outspoken critic and political foe, the Bolshevik Filipp Makharadze, who is believed to have been involved in Chavchavadze's assassination. While Gamsakhurdia's death was officially attributed to natural causes, Zviad penned an open letter to Yuri Andropov in 1975 in which he asserted that the KGB had poisoned his father.

== Bibliography ==
=== Novels ===
- დიონისოს ღიმილი; English translation: The Smile of Dionysus (1925)
- გოეთეს ცხოვრების რომანი; English translation: Novel of the life of Goethe (1934)
- მთვარის მოტაცება; English translation: Kidnapping the Moon (1935—1936)
- ევროპა გალიაში; English translation: Europe in the Cage (1937, Unfinished)
- ბელადი; English translation: The Leader (1938—1939, Unfinished)
- დიდოსტატის კონსტანტინეს მარჯვენა; English translation: The Right Hand of the Grand Master (1939)
- დავით აღმაშენებელი; English translation: David the Builder (1946—1958)
- ვაზის ყვავილობა; English translation: Flowering of Vine (1956)
- თამარ; English translation: Tamar (Unfinished)

=== Selected novellas and short stories ===
- საათები; English translation: Hours
- დედავ, მისტიურო ქალო!; English translation: Mother, Mystical woman!
- დამსხვრეული ჩონგური; English translation: Broken Chonguri
- ნაპოლეონი; English translation: Napoleon
- სიბრძნე სიცრუისა; English translation: The Wisdom of Lies
- ტაბუ; English translation: Taboo
- ქალის რძე; English translation: Woman's Milk
- ქართული ჩაბალახი; English translation: Georgian Chabalakhi
- დიდი იოსები; English translation: Great Ioseph
