= Arsukisdze =

Medieval Georgian architect

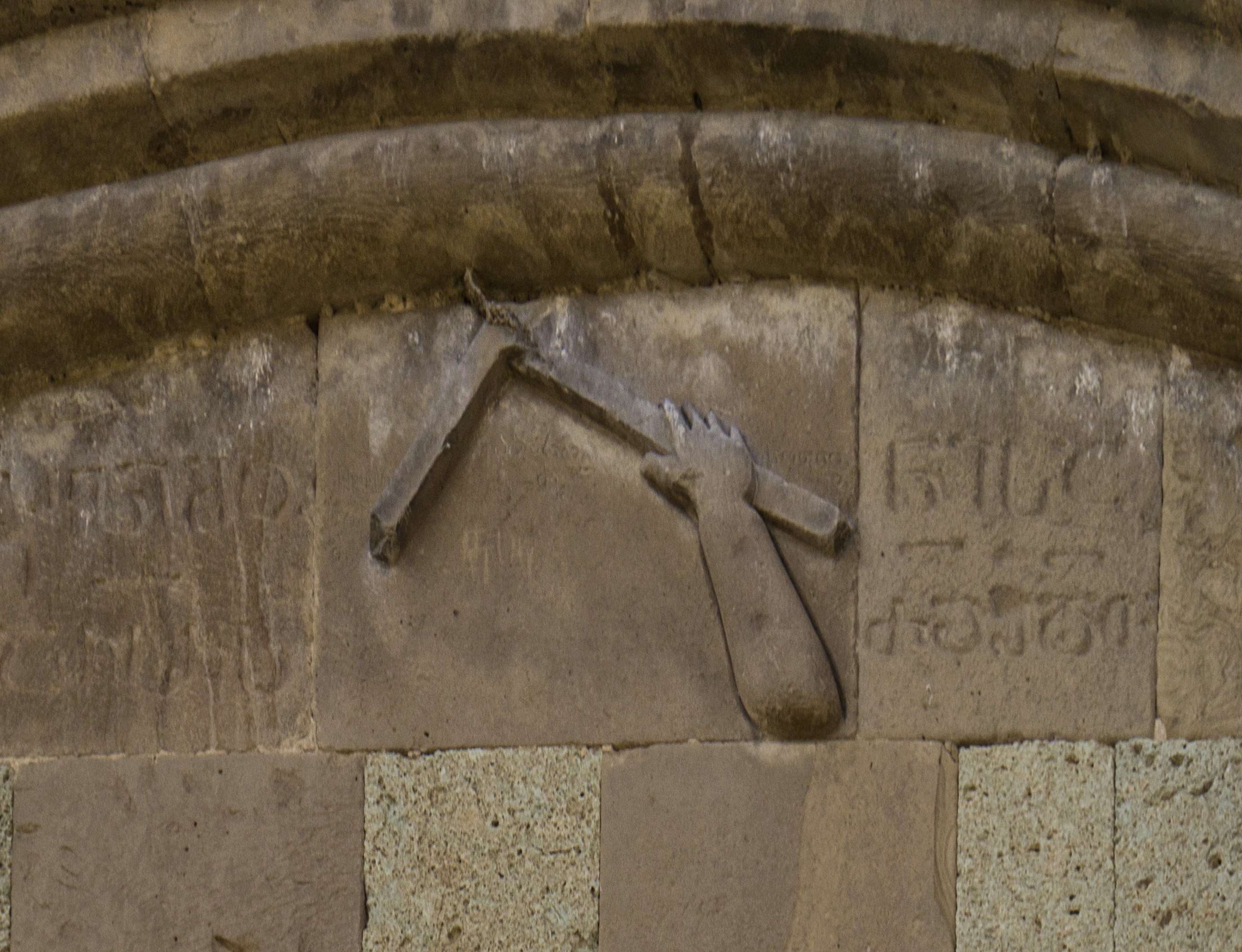
The relief sculpture on the northern wall of Svetitskhoveli Cathedral

Arsukidze or Arsukisdze (Georgian: არსუკისძე, romanized: arsuk'isdze) was a Georgian architect who built Svetitskhoveli Cathedral in Mtskheta, the then capital of the Kingdom of Georgia.

His name is inscribed on the external northern wall of the Svetitskhoveli Cathedral. A relief sculpture shows a right arm and hand holding an L-square - symbol of the stonemason – with an inscription reads:

The Hand of Arsukidze,

slave of God,

may forgiveness be his.

An inscription on the east façade further attests to the fact that Arsukidze did not live to see his masterpiece finished (in 1029):

This holy church was built by the hand of Thy wretched servant, Arsukidze. May your soul rest in peace, O Master.

His given name or other details are unknown.

== In popular culture ==
Konstantine Gamsakhurdia's novel, The Right Hand of the Grand Master is based on the person of Arsukidze. In the novel, Gamsakhurdia uses Konstantine as his given name and changes the Surname Arsukidze with Arsakidze. Soso Sigua thinks that he does so for political reasons. SUK (Georgian: სუკი) was a Georgian abbreviation of KGB and according to Sigua, Gamsakhurdia did not want the readers to associate the character with the security forces. However, this is a far-fetched theory, because the novel was written and published in the 1930's, while the name KGB didn't exist until the mid-1950's
