= Khtsisi John the Baptist church =

Church in Khashuri, Georgia

- ხცისის იოანე ნათლისმცემლის ეკლესია
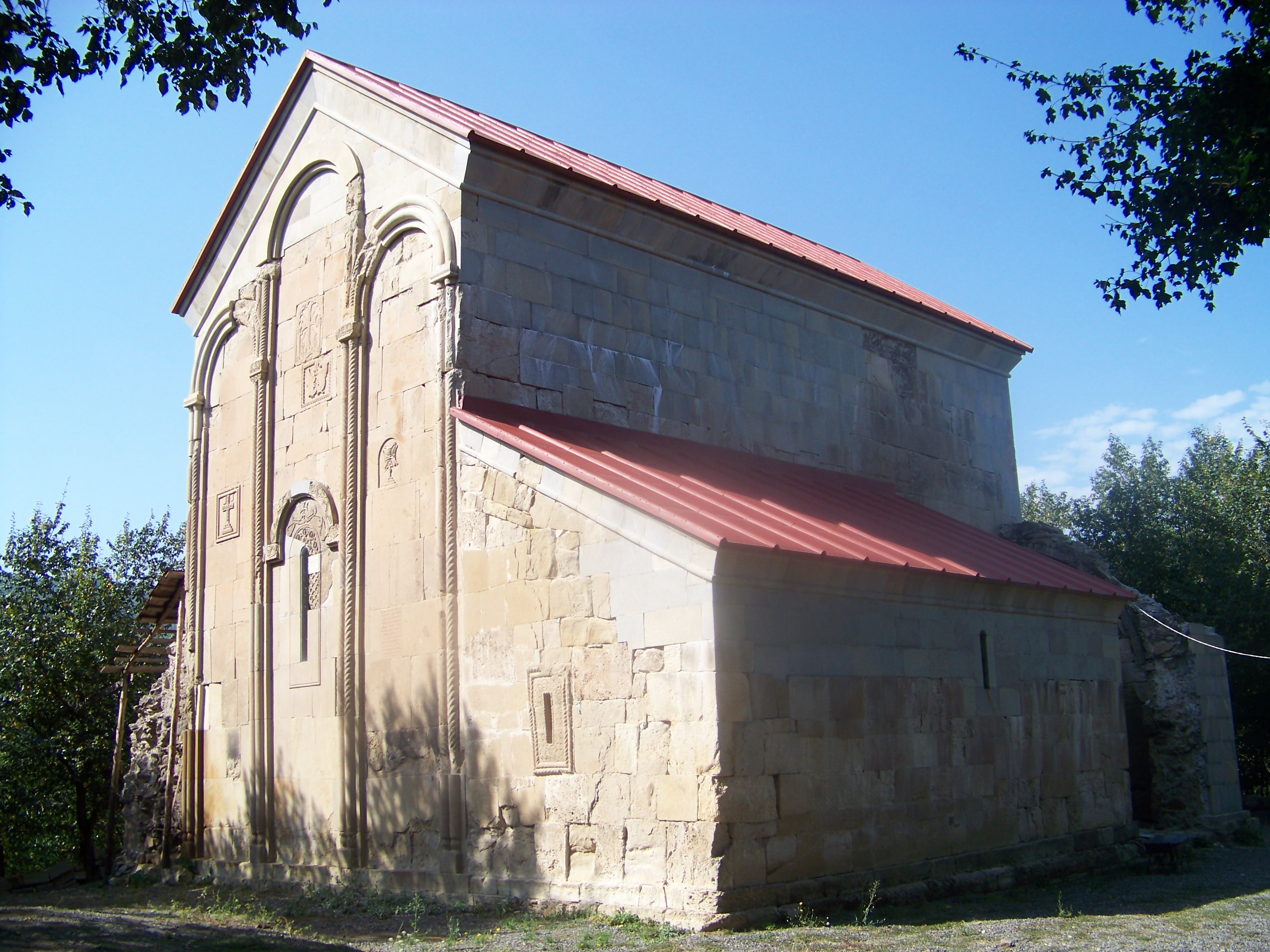
- Khtsisi John the Baptist church

- Location within Shida Kartli Location within Georgia

Religion
- Affiliation: Georgian Orthodox Church
- District: Khashuri Municipality
- Region: Caucasus
- Status: Active

Location
- Location: Likhauri, Khashuri Municipality, Georgia
- Coordinates: 41°58′51″N 43°40′30″E

Architecture
- Style: Georgian; Church

Khtsisi John the Baptist church (Georgian: ხცისის იოანე ნათლისმცემლის ეკლესია) Tsvimoeti church is a church in Georgia, Shida Kartli region, Khashuri municipality. It is 1.5 km from the village Khtsisi (Khashuri district).

== History ==
The church of John the Baptist is a hall-type church. In the inscription on the eastern façade is said that the church was built in 1002 in time of Bagrat III. The monument is considered one of the best examples of single-nave churches. The most important are the rich ornaments, bas-relieves with animal figures. The arcades and the upper parts of the church are broken down, in the south there is a small chapel-eukterion. The church has two entrances from the south and from the west. There is only one window on the west, south and eastern walls. There are three arches on the eastern facade, the middle arch is taller than other arches. The same thing happens on the north and west facades.

In 2006, Khtsisi John the Baptist church was indicated as a National Cultural Monuments of Georgia.

== Literature ==
- Description of Georgian historical and cultural monuments, volume 5. pages:460-462, Tbilisi; 1990.
