= Melchizedek I of Georgia =

Catholicos-Patriarch of All Georgia from 1010 to 1033

Saint Melchizedek I
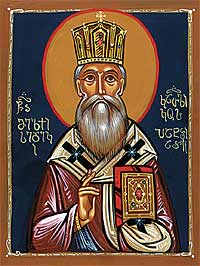
- Icon of Melchizedek

Catholicos-Patriarch of All Georgia
- Died: 1033
- Venerated in: Eastern Orthodox Church
- Canonized: October 17, 2002, Georgia by Georgian Orthodox Church
- Feast: October 1

Melchizedek I (Georgian: მელქისედეკ I) was the first Catholicos-Patriarch of All Georgia, serving from c. 1010 to 1033, and was based in Ani. He is venerated as a saint by the Eastern Orthodox Church. Prior to his tenure, the heads of the Georgian Church bore the title of Catholicos of Kartli. The unification of Georgia into a single kingdom under Bagrat III (r. 975–1014) contributed to the adoption of the combined title of Catholicos-Patriarch.

Following the repose of Catholicos Simeon, Melchizedek succeeded to the leadership of the Georgian Church, serving during the reigns of Bagrat III, George I, and Bagrat IV. He is traditionally regarded as the first Georgian hierarch to bear the title of Catholicos-Patriarch.

According to historical sources, Melchizedek was of noble origin and received his education at the royal court, possibly as a pupil of King Bagrat III. His close association with the monarchy strengthened the institutional position of the Church within the unified Georgian state.

One of the most significant achievements of his tenure was the restoration and embellishment of Svetitskhoveli Cathedral in Mtskheta. To support this project, Melchizedek undertook several journeys to Constantinople, where he met the Byzantine emperor Basil II. He returned with substantial gifts and resources, which enabled the cathedral to be adorned with gold, silver, pearls, and precious stones.

It is believed that during one of his visits to Byzantium, the eastern patriarchs recognized the title “Catholicos-Patriarch” as the official designation of the head of the Georgian Apostolic Orthodox Church. This title is also attested in Melchizedek’s surviving testament.

In 1031, Melchizedek successfully petitioned Bagrat III to grant tax immunity to the Church, reflecting the considerable influence of the Church within the state at the time.

Melchizedek’s will records his donations of churches, monasteries, villages, and sacred objects to Svetitskhoveli Cathedral and specifies the location of his intended burial.

He was glorified by the Georgian Orthodox Church on October 17, 2002. His feast day is observed on October 1.
