= Svetitskhoveli Cathedral =

Orthodox Christian cathedral in Mtskheta, Georgia

- სვეტიცხოვლის საკათედრო ტაძარი
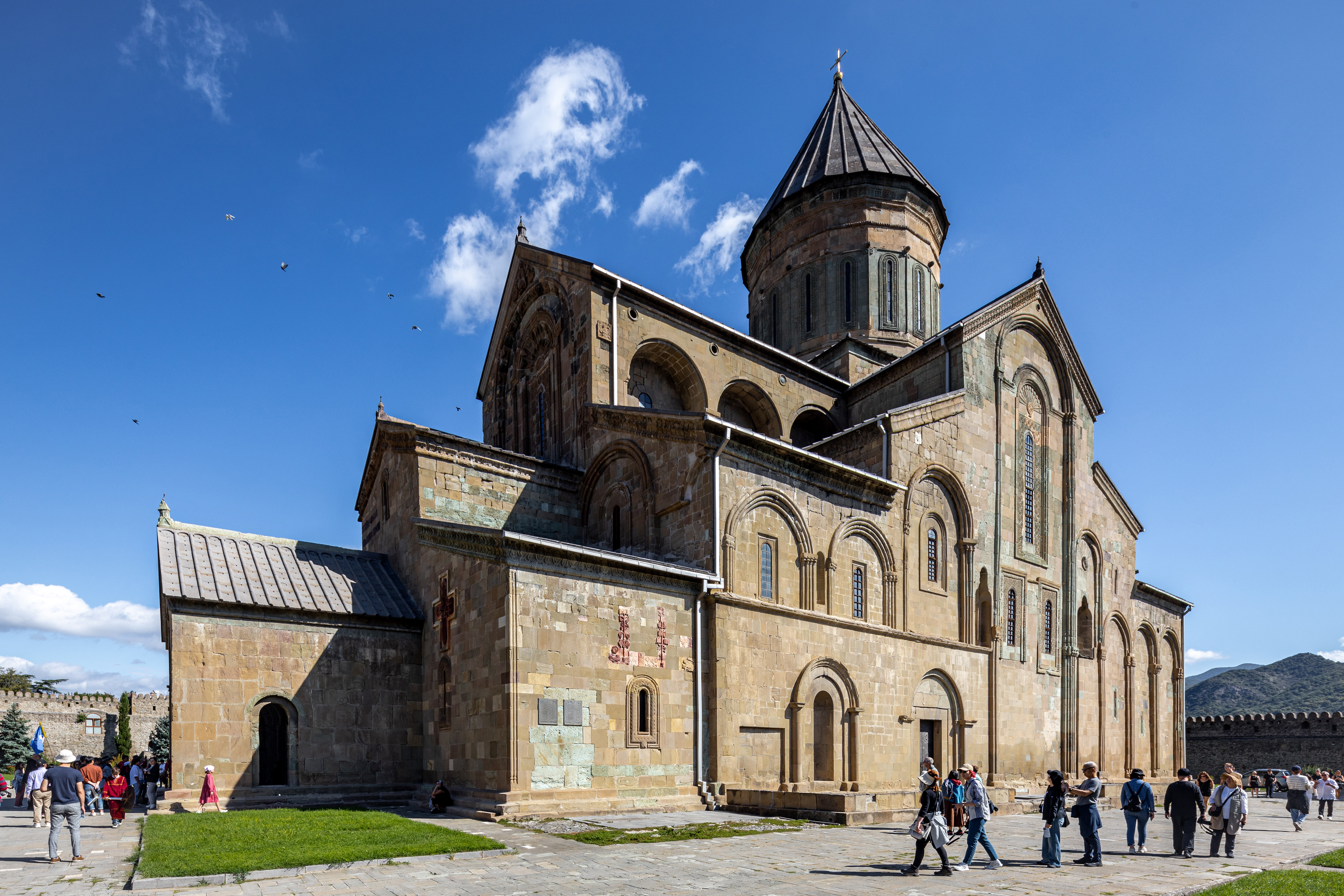
- Svetitskhoveli Cathedral
- 41.8419°N 44.7211°E
- Location: Mtskheta, Mtskheta-Mtianeti
- Country: Georgia
- Denomination: Georgian Orthodox Church

Architecture
- Previous cathedrals: One built in the 4th century AD (by King Mirian III); Second one built in the 5th century AD (during the reign of Vakhtang I)
- Architect: Arsukisdze
- Architectural type: Cathedral
- Style: Cross-in-square
- Groundbreaking: 1010
- Completed: 1029 (during the reign of King George I)

Specifications
- Length: 57.7 metres (189 ft)
- Width: 27 metres (89 ft)
- Height: 49 metres (161 ft)
- Materials: stone

UNESCO World Heritage Site
- Official name: Historical Monuments of Mtskheta
- Type: Cultural
- Criteria: iii, iv
- Designated: 1994 (18th session)
- Reference no.: 708
- Region: Europe

Immovable Cultural Monument of National Significance of Georgia
- Official name: Svetitskhoveli Complex
- Designated: November 7, 2006; 19 years ago
- Reference no.: 2507
- Item Number in Cultural Heritage Portal: 5080
- Date of entry in the registry: October 3, 2007; 18 years ago

The Svetitskhoveli Cathedral (Note: Georgian: სვეტიცხოვლის საკათედრო ტაძარი, romanized: Svet’itskhovlis sak’atedro t’adzari, pronounced [sʷetʼit͡sʰχovlis sakʼatʰedɾo tʼad͡zaɾi]; lit. 'Cathedral of the Living Pillar') is an Orthodox Christian cathedral located in the historic town of Mtskheta, Georgia, northwest of the Georgian capital Tbilisi. A masterpiece of the Early and High Middle Ages, Svetitskhoveli is recognized by UNESCO as a World Heritage Site. It is currently the second-largest church building in Georgia, after the Holy Trinity Cathedral.

Known as the burial site of the claimed Christ's mantle, Svetitskhoveli has long been one of the principal Georgian Orthodox churches and is among the most venerated places of worship in the region. Throughout the centuries, the cathedral served as the burial place for kings. The present cross-in-square structure was completed between 1010 and 1029 by the medieval Georgian architect Arsukisdze, although the site itself dates back to the early fourth century. The exterior archature of the cathedral is a well-preserved example of typical 11th-century decoration.

Svetitskhoveli is considered an endangered cultural landmark; it has survived various adversities, and many of its priceless frescoes were lost due to being whitewashed by the Russian Imperial authorities. It is considered one of the four Great Cathedrals of the Georgian Orthodox world.

== History ==
=== Early history ===
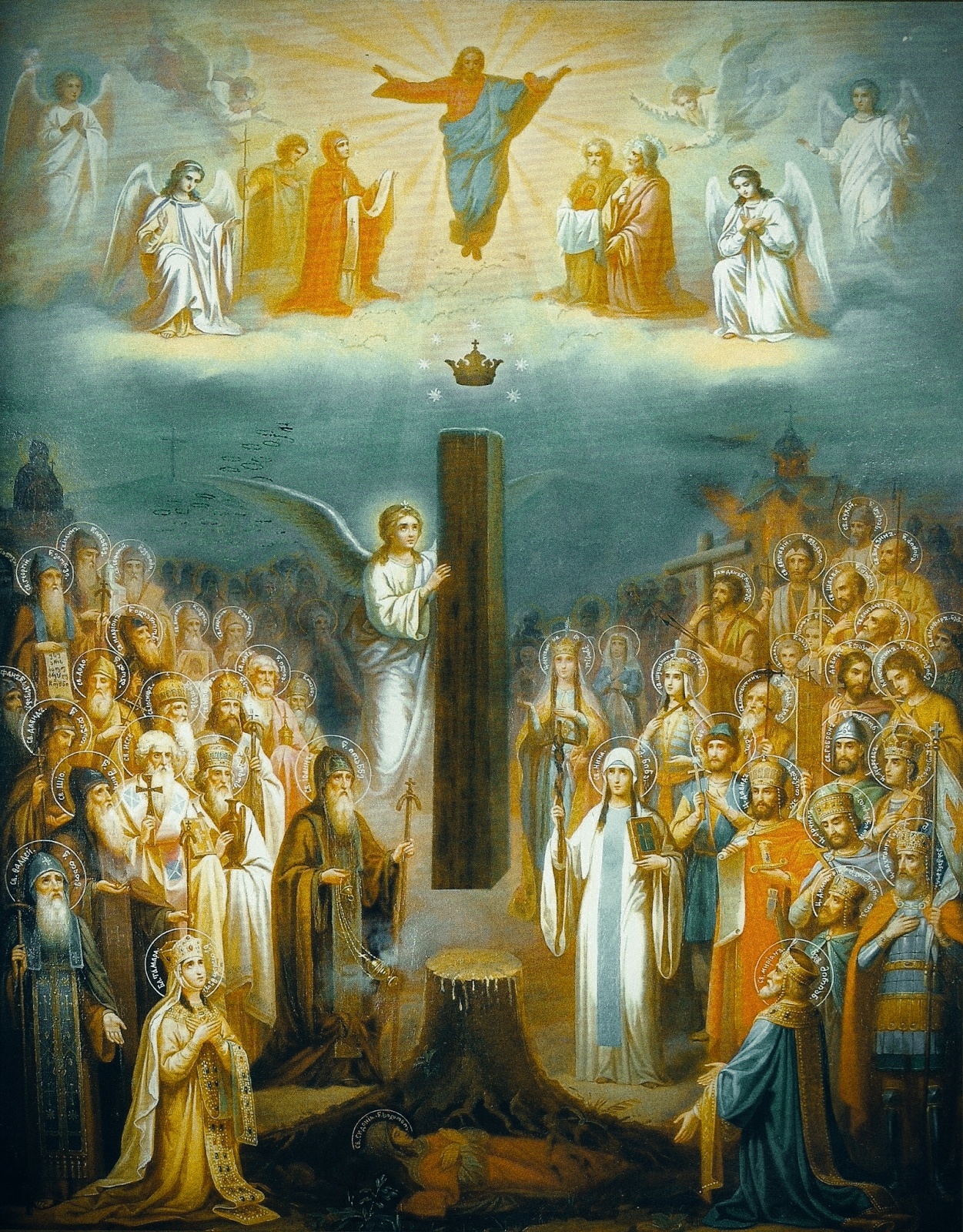
The Glory of Iberia (1880s), an icon by Mikhail Sabinin illustrating the legend of the Living Pillar.

The original church was built in the 4th century AD during the reign of Mirian III of Kartli (Iberia). Saint Nino is said to have chosen the confluence of the Mtkvari (Kura) and Aragvi rivers as the site of the first Georgian church.

According to Georgian hagiography, in the 1st century AD, a Georgian Jew from Mtskheta named Elias was in Jerusalem when Jesus was crucified. Elias bought Jesus’ robe from a Roman soldier at Golgotha and brought it back to Georgia. Returning to his native city, he was met by his sister Sidonia, who, upon touching the robe, immediately died from the emotions generated by the sacred object. The robe could not be removed from her dead hands, so she was buried with it. The place where Sidonia is buried with the robe is preserved in the cathedral. Later, from her grave grew an enormous cedar tree. Ordering the cedar to be cut down to build the church, St. Nino had seven columns made from it for the foundation. The seventh column, however, had supernatural properties and rose by itself into the air. It returned to the ground after St. Nino prayed throughout the night. It was further said that from the seventh column flowed a sacred liquid that cured people of all diseases.

In Georgian, sveti means "pillar" and tskhoveli means "life-giving" or "living", hence the name of the cathedral. An icon portraying this event can be seen on the third column on the left-hand side from the entrance. Reproduced widely throughout Georgia, it shows Sidonia's corpse at the root of a cedar tree stump, with an angel lifting the column toward heaven. Saint Nino is in the foreground, and King Mirian and his wife, Queen Nana, are positioned to the right and left. Georgia officially adopted Christianity as its state religion in 337.

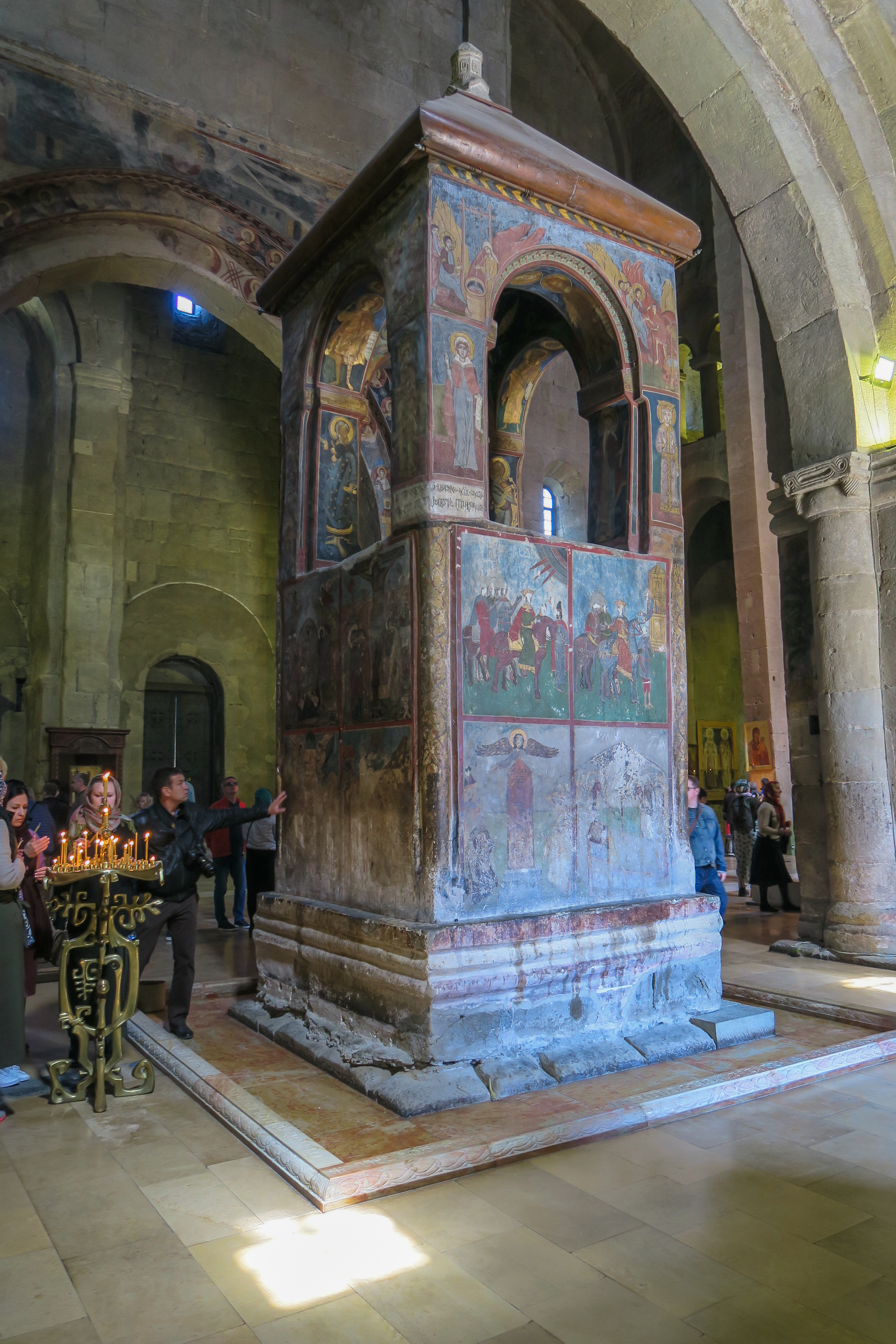
A 17th-century ciborium under which the robe of Jesus is said to have been buried

=== Medieval and modern ===
Svetitskhoveli Cathedral, originally built in the 4th century, has been damaged several times throughout history, notably by Arabs, Persians, Timurids, and later during Russian rule and the Soviet period. The building has also suffered damage from earthquakes.

The present Svetitskhoveli Cathedral was constructed between 1010 and 1029 by the architect Arsukidze, at the invitation of the Catholicos Melchizedek I of Georgia. The king of Georgia at that time was Giorgi I.

A notable reconstruction was carried out at the end of the 14th century after it was destroyed by Tamerlane. The next major renovation occurred at the beginning of the 15th century, when the current dome was built, and it was subsequently renovated again in the mid-17th century.

During the 1970–71 restoration, presided over by Vakhtang Tsintsadze, the base of the basilica built in the late 5th century by King Vakhtang Gorgasali after St. Nino's original church was discovered. During the early years of Georgian church construction, the basilica was the dominant type of Georgian church architecture before the crossed-dome style emerged.

The cathedral is surrounded by a defensive wall built of stone and brick during the reign of King Erekle II in 1787. In the early 1830s, the cathedral was visited by the Russian Emperor. In connection with this visit, the portal galleries surrounding the church on the north, west, and south, which had been in poor condition, were demolished.

Archaeological expeditions in 1963 discovered the 11th-century house of the Patriarch at the southern part of the wall. Inside the churchyard, the remains of the two-story palace of Patriarch Anton II were found.

== Architecture ==
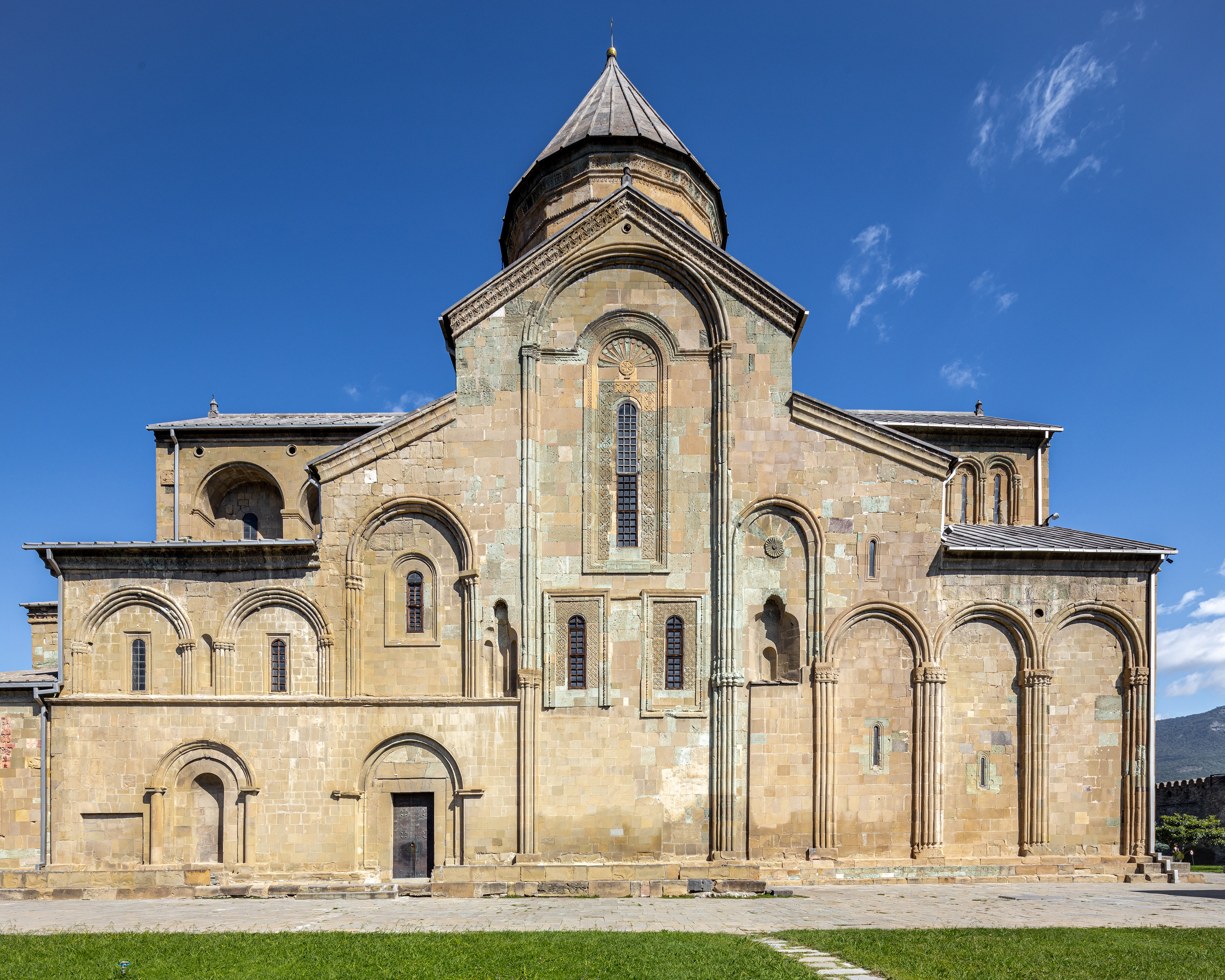
Elevation view from the southern side

The cathedral is set on a flat lowland amidst the old town of Mtskheta, as its most significant structure, visible from nearly every spot.

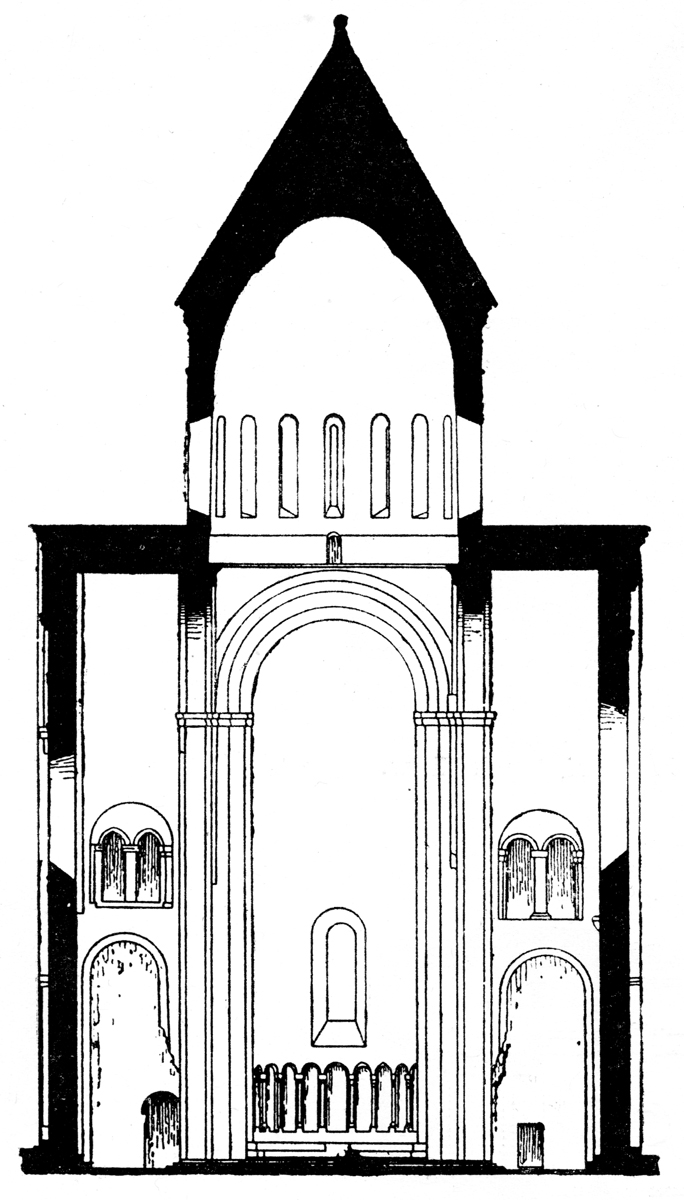
Elevation from the entrance

The base of the three-storey basilica, believed to have been built by Vakhtang Gorgasali after St. Nino's original church, was found by archaeologists during the 1970–71 restoration. Its remnants can be seen in the western and southeastern parts, as well as under the pillars beneath the floor. The remains of an even older wooden church were discovered in the southern arm of the cross.

The architecture of the present Svetitskhoveli Cathedral, which dates from around 1020, is based on the cross-dome style of church architecture, which emerged in Georgia in the early Middle Ages and became the principal style after the political unification of Georgia by Bagrat III (978–1014). A characteristic of this style is that the dome is supported across all four sides of the church. There was originally a more harmonious three-step silhouette, with porticoes on the south, west, and north. The northern and southern porticoes were demolished in the 1830s. The current entrance to the cathedral is from the west.

The church's structure is intended to ensure good acoustics. Large windows on the dome and walls provide ample light. The church's plan is a cross, with shorter transverse arms and longer longitudinal arms. The east end contains an apse. The dome of Svetitskhoveli was reconstructed several times over the centuries to maintain the church in good condition. The current dome is from the 15th century, with its upper part reconstructed in the 17th century, when it lost its original height and was reduced in size.

The primary stone used for the cathedral is sandy yellow with trimmings, while a red stone is used around the apse window. The green stone used in the drum of the cupola dates from the 17th century.

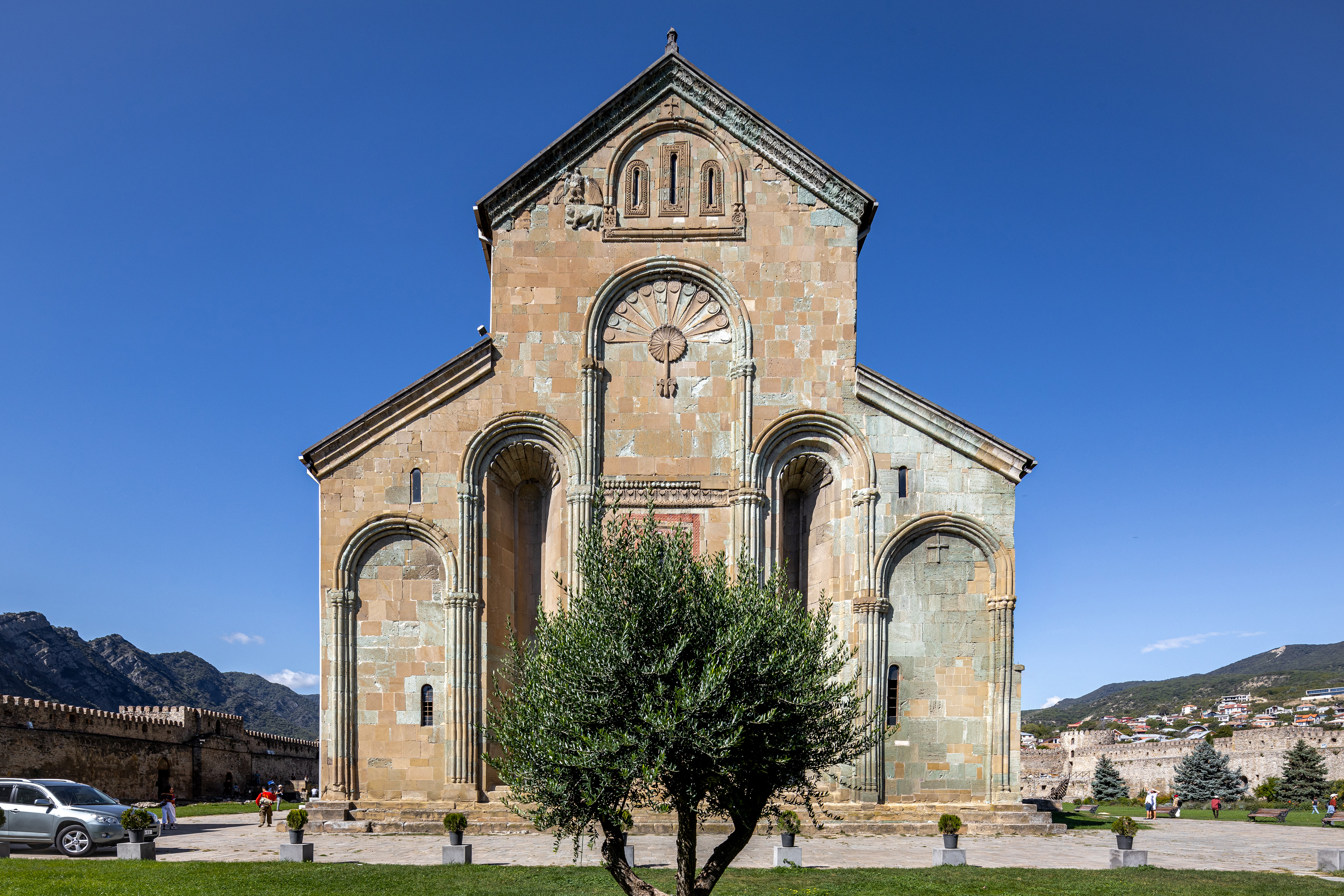
Eastern facade with niches, windows, and various decorations

The church facades are richly decorated. The curved blind arcading is preserved from the 11th century. The arches genuinely ascend or descend according to the height of the corresponding section of the facade, creating an impression of constant movement. Two high and deep niches on the eastern facade stand in clear contrast with the surrounding illuminated walls. Each window is framed by an ornamental stripe and stylized peacock tail-like decorations. Similar decorations are appear in the upper parts of the eastern niches. A writing above the windows of the eastern facade states that the church was built by katolikos Melchisedek. Above it, two low-reliefs — an eagle with open wings and a lion below it — are positioned to the south of three more recent accessory windows beneath the roof.

A large window occupies most of the western top side of the church. Its decoration depicts the Ascension of Jesus, with Christ seated on the throne and two angels on both sides. This triangular decoration fits harmoniously with the triangle of the cornice and the arch below it. The original sculpture on the wall has not survived but has been restored several times, most recently in the 19th century.

=== The architect Arsukidze ===
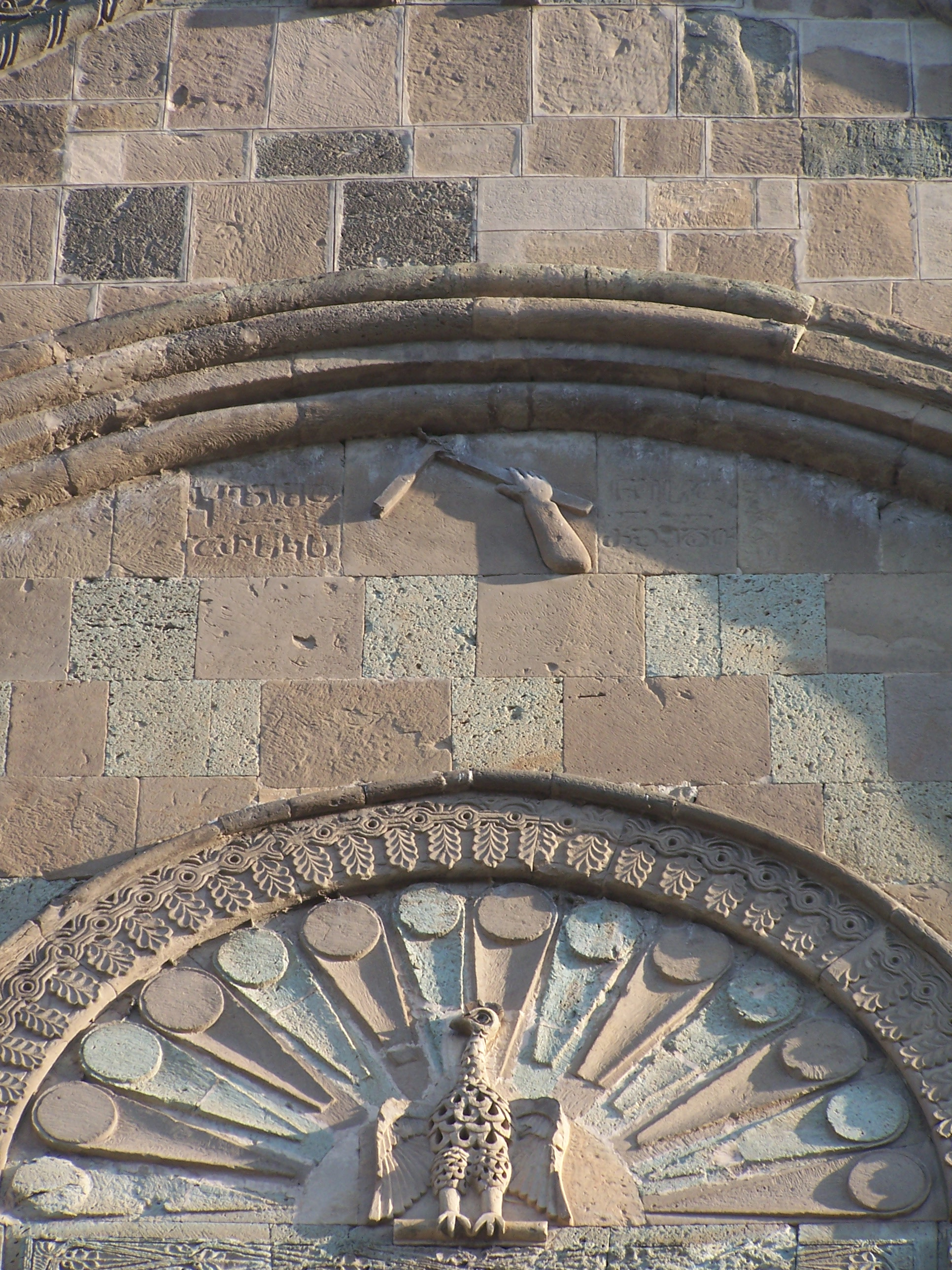
The relief sculpture on the northern wall of Svetitskhoveli Cathedral

A legend surrounds a relief sculpture on the external northern wall. It depicts a right arm and hand holding an L-square — the stonemason’s symbol — with an inscription reading:

The Hand of Arsukidze,

slave of God,

may forgiveness be his.

An inscription on the east façade further attests that Arsukidze did not live to see his masterpiece finished (in 1029):

This holy church was built by the hand of Thy wretched servant, Arsukidze. May your soul rest in peace, O Master.

Konstantine Gamsakhurdia's novel The Hand of the Great Master recounts the legend, for which there is no documentary evidence, that a priest who had also been Arsukidze's patron and teacher was so jealous of Arsukidze's success that he used his influence with the king to have the architect's right hand cut off. According to the novel, King George was also jealous of his lover, the beautiful Shorena.

=== Icons and frescoes ===
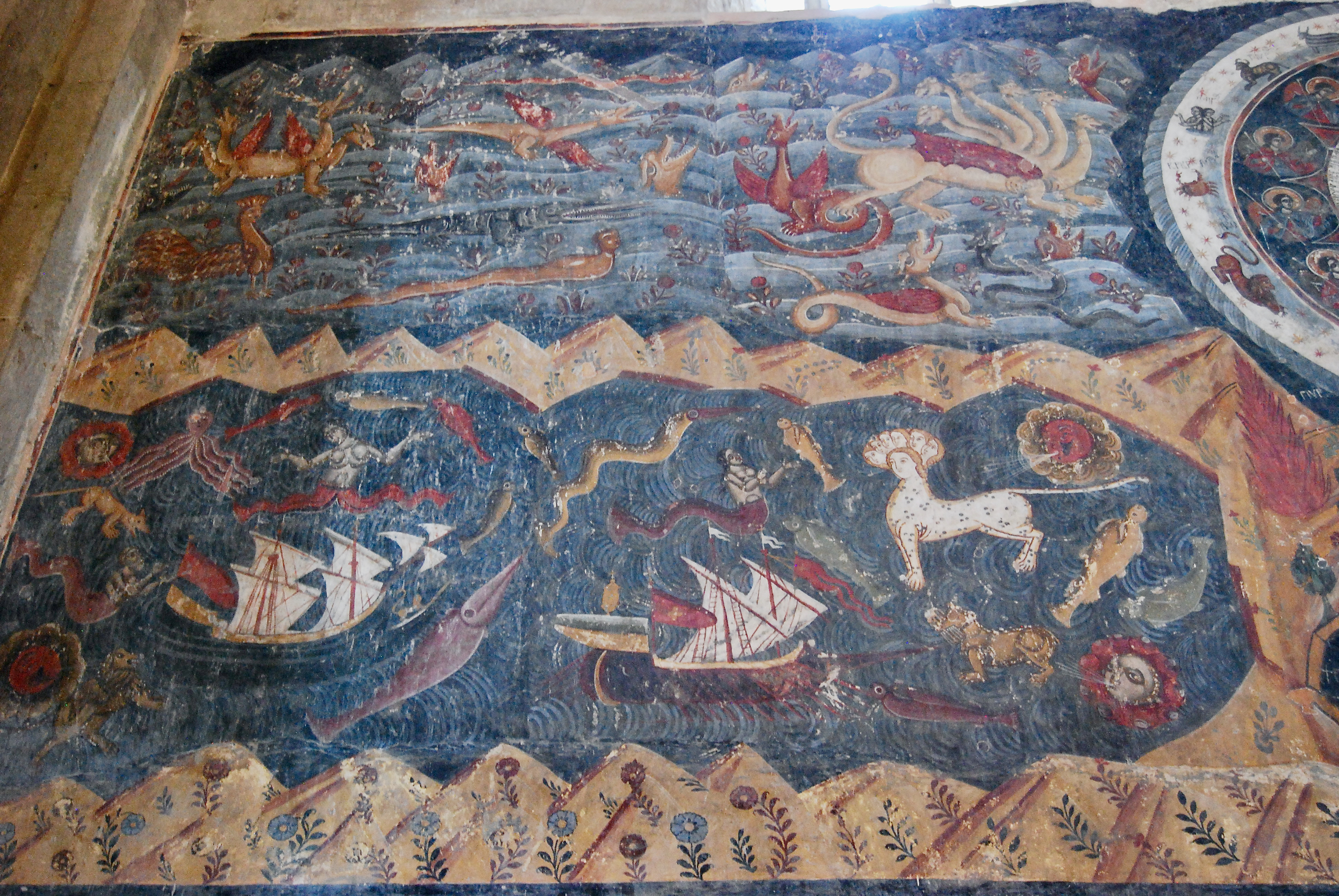
One of the frescoes of the Svetitskhoveli Cathedral

The cathedral's interior walls were once completely adorned with medieval frescoes, but many of them have not survived. In the 1830s, when Emperor Nicholas I was scheduled to visit Mtskheta, Russian authorities demolished the galleries and whitewashed timeless frescoes to give the cathedral a "tidier appearance"; in the end, the Czar never visited. Today, after careful restoration, some frescoes survive, including a 13th-century depiction of the "Beast of the Apocalypse" and figures of the Zodiac.

The walls are decorated with many Christian Orthodox icons, most of which are not original (the originals are preserved in the national museums of Georgia). The church's stonework also features carved grapes (as in many churches of Georgia), reflecting the country's ancient wine-making traditions. The large figure of Jesus at the altar was painted by a Russian artist in the 19th century. The majority of the icons date to the 20th century, with some being copies of older icons and frescoes from other churches across Georgia.

Two bulls' heads on the east façade, remnants of the 5th-century church, attest to the folk influence on Christian iconography during that early period.

=== Baptismal font ===
On the right side of the entrance is a stone baptismal font dating from the 4th century. It is thought to have been used for the baptism of King Mirian and Queen Nana. Immediately behind the font is a reproduction of the relief of Arsukidze's right hand and bevel from the north facade.

=== Symbolic copy of the Chapel of Holy Sepulchre ===
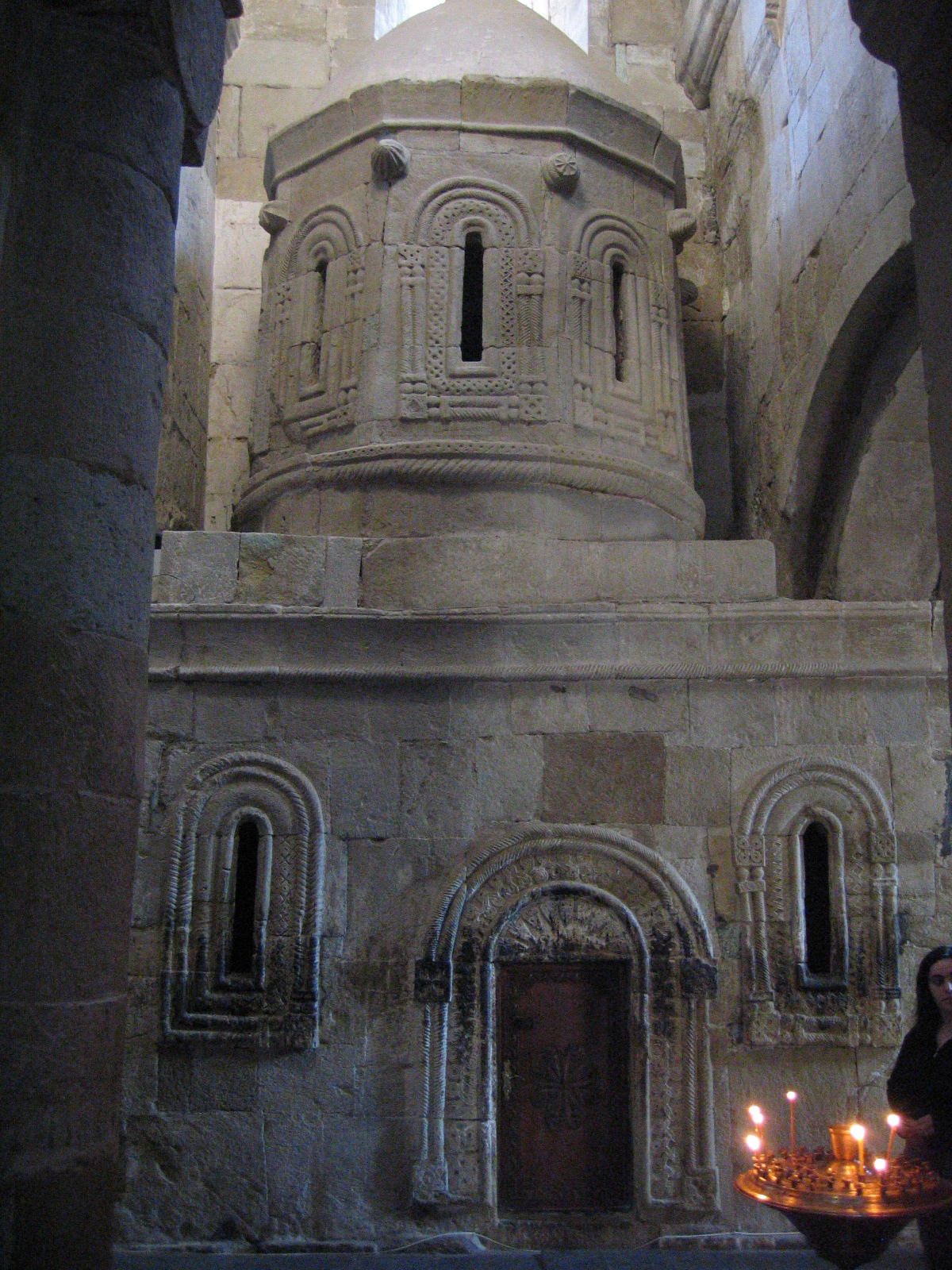
A 14th-century copy of the aedicule of the Church of the Holy Sepulchre

On the south side, a small stone church is built into the cathedral. This is a symbolic copy of the Chapel of Holy Sepulchre in Jerusalem. Constructed between the late 13th and early 14th centuries, it was erected to mark Svetitskhoveli as the second most sacred place in the world (after the church in Jerusalem), owing to Christ's robe. In front of this stone chapel, the most westerly structure aligned with the columns between the aisle and the nave marks Sidonia's grave. Remains of the original life-giving pillar are also here. The chapel was built in the 17th century. Scenes depicting the lives of King Mirian and Queen Nana, and portraits of the first Christian Byzantine Emperor, Constantine I, and his mother Helena, were painted by G. Gulzhavarashvili at that time. Traces of the foundations of the 4th-century church have been found here.

=== Throne of Catholicos-Patriarch ===
The second structure aligned with the columns of the southern aisle was also built in the 17th century as the throne of Catholicos Diasamidze. It no longer serves this function, as current tradition requires the Georgian patriarch's throne to be at the centre of the church.

== Burials in the cathedral ==
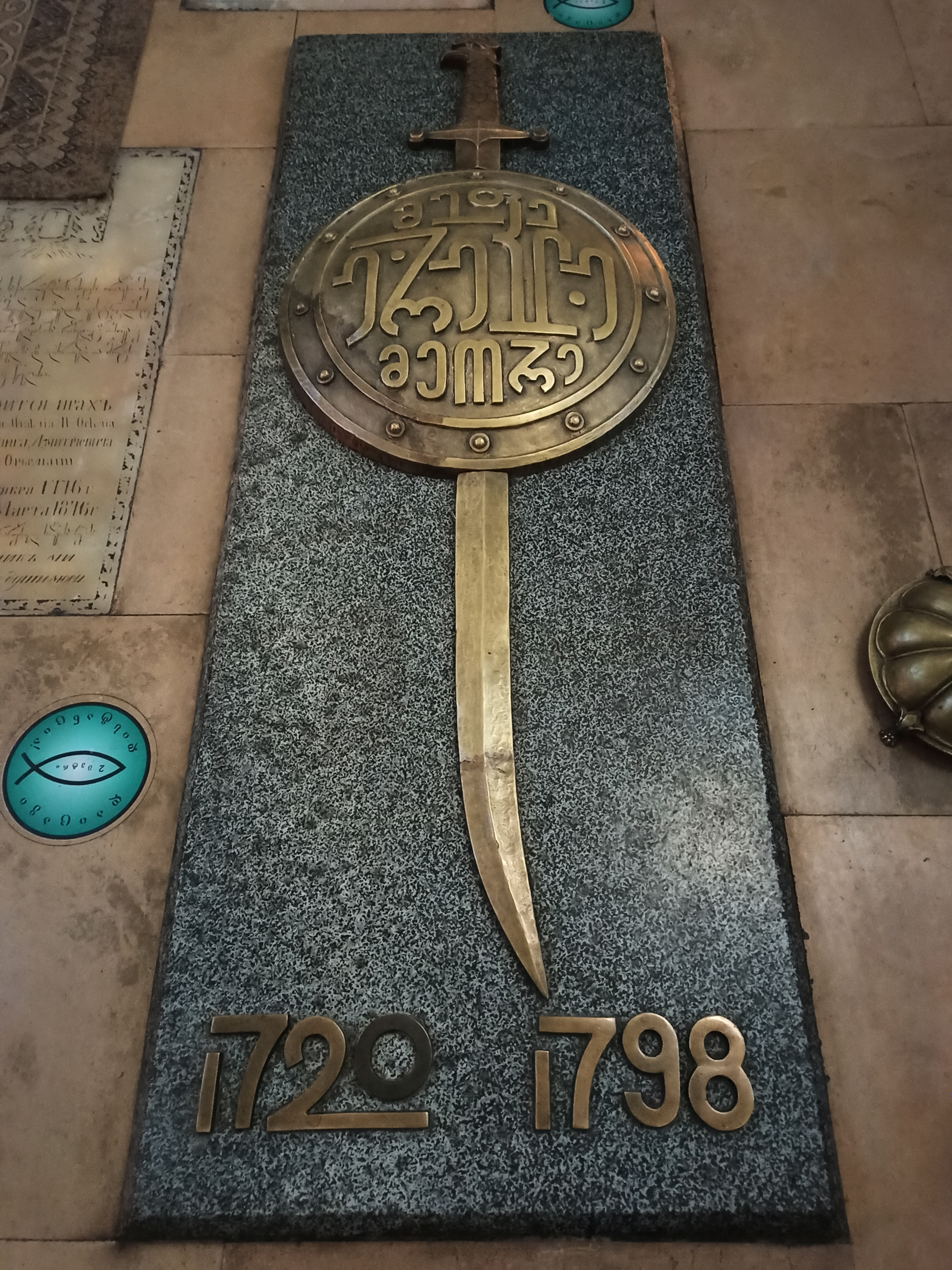
Tomb of Erekle II in Svetitskhoveli Cathedral.

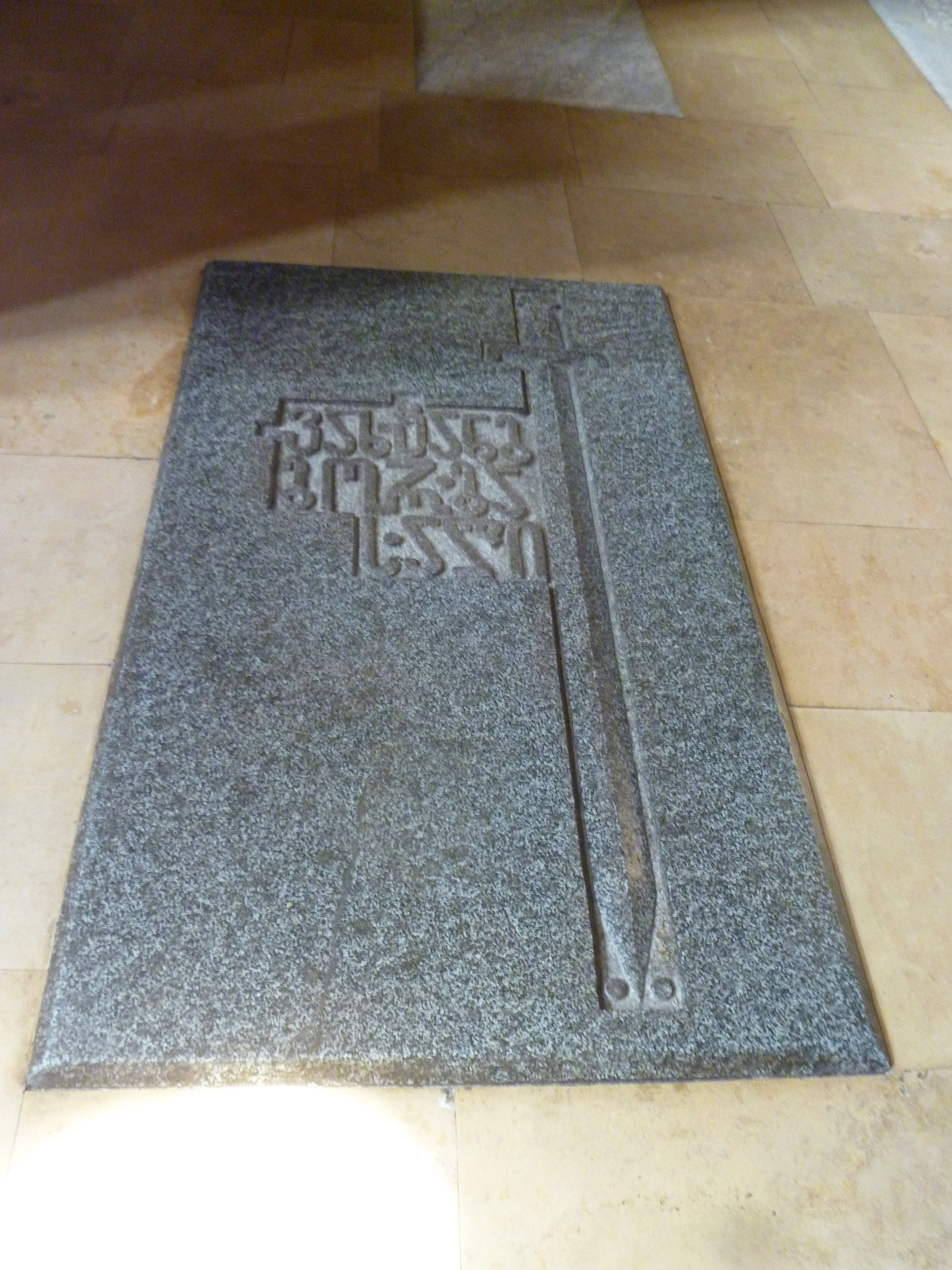
Tomb of Vakhtang Gorgasali in Svetitskhoveli Cathedral

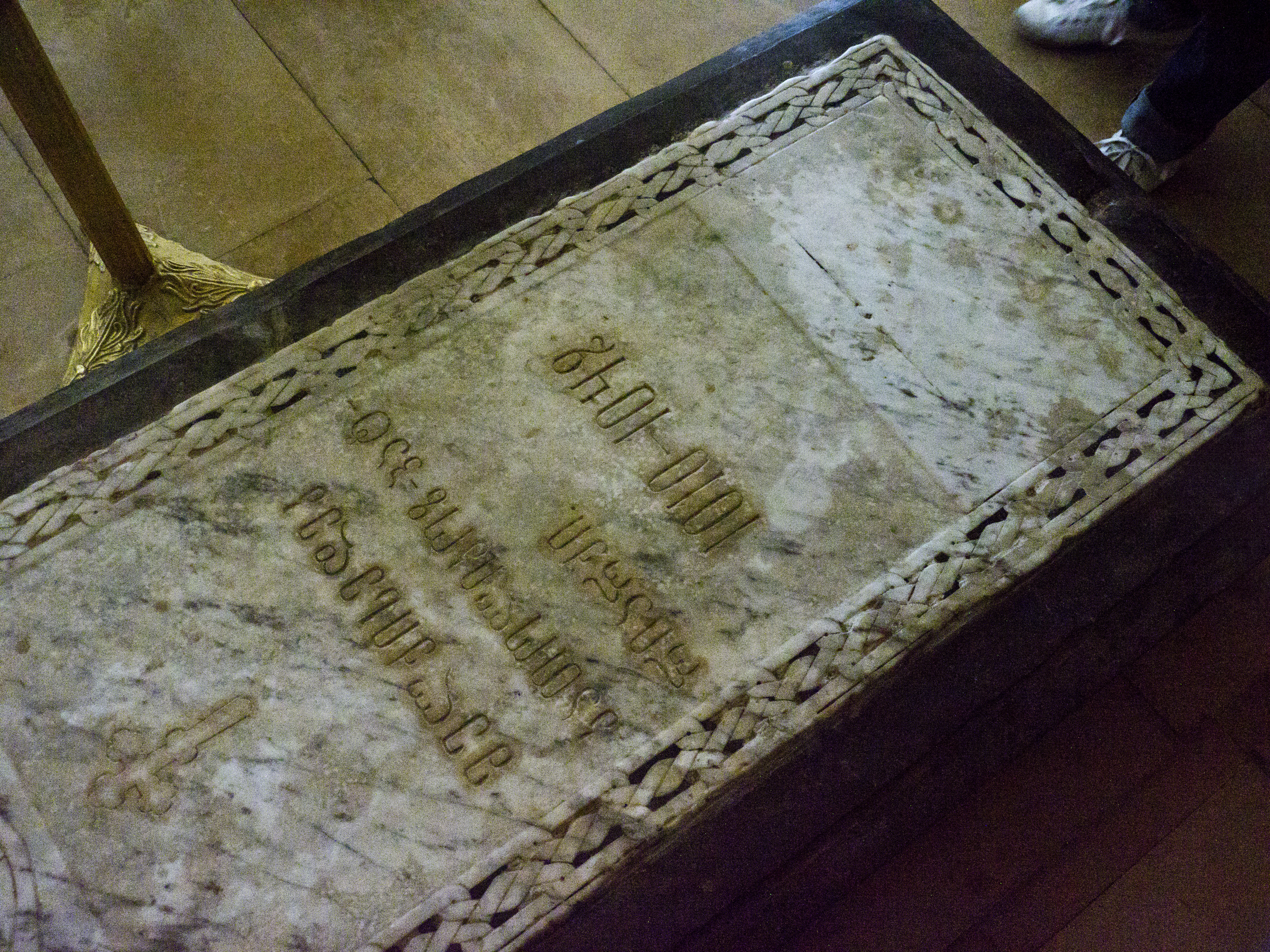
Tomb of Melchizedek I of Georgia in Svetitskhoveli Cathedral

Svetitskhoveli was not only the site of the coronation of the Georgian kings but also served as their burial place. Ten are known to have been buried here, although only six tombs have been found, all before the altar. The tomb of King Vakhtang Gorgasali can be found in the central part of the cathedral and identified by the small candle fortress standing before it. King Erekle II's tomb is identifiable by the sword and shield upon it. His son, George XII was the last king of Georgia and his marble tomb is next to his father's. Also in front of the altar are tombs of David VI, George VIII, Luarsab I and various members of the Bagrationi royal family including Tamar, the first wife of George XI, whose epitaph dating from 1684 is written both in Georgian (Asomtavruli) and Persian script.

== Other constructions ==
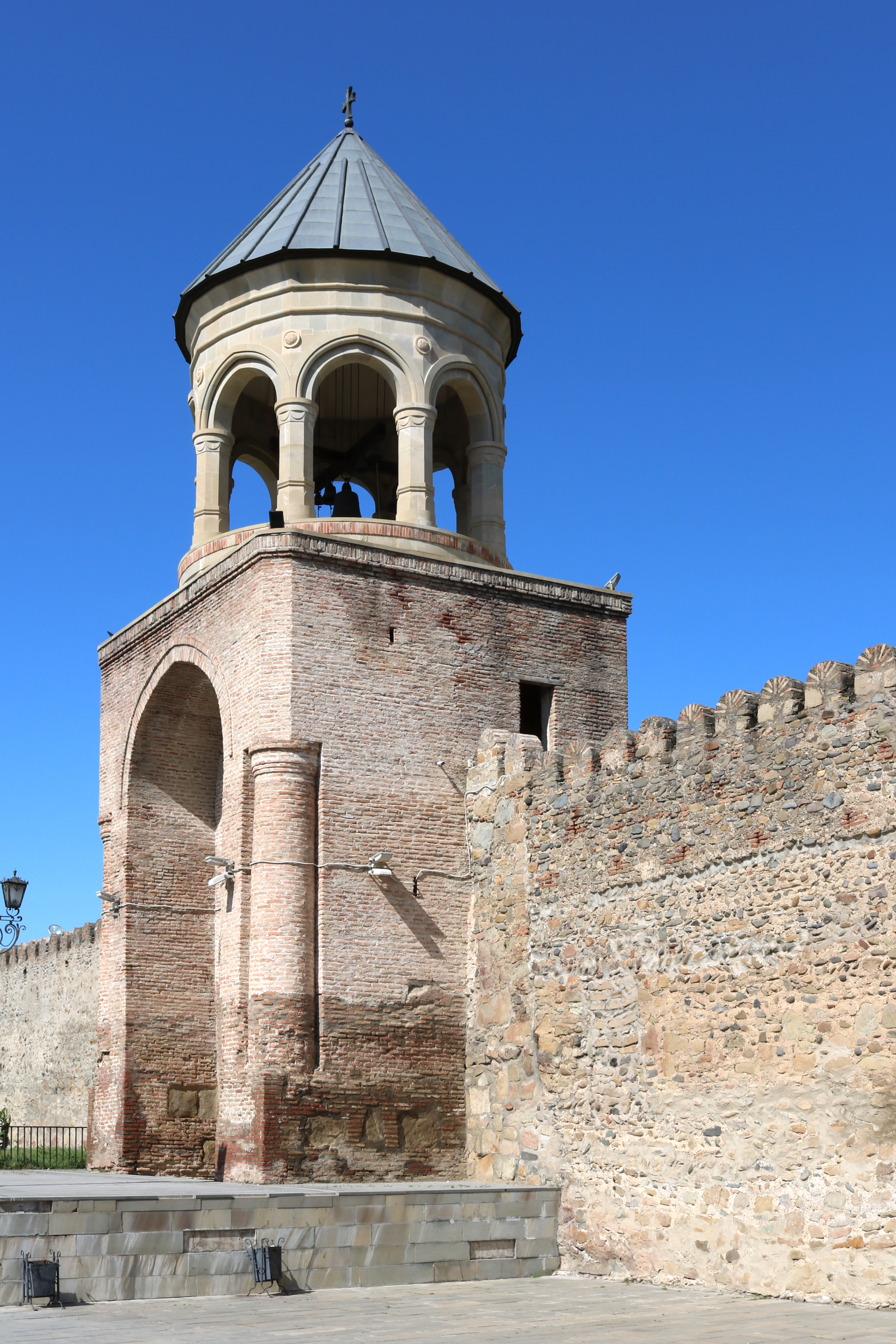
Tower at the western entrance to the territory

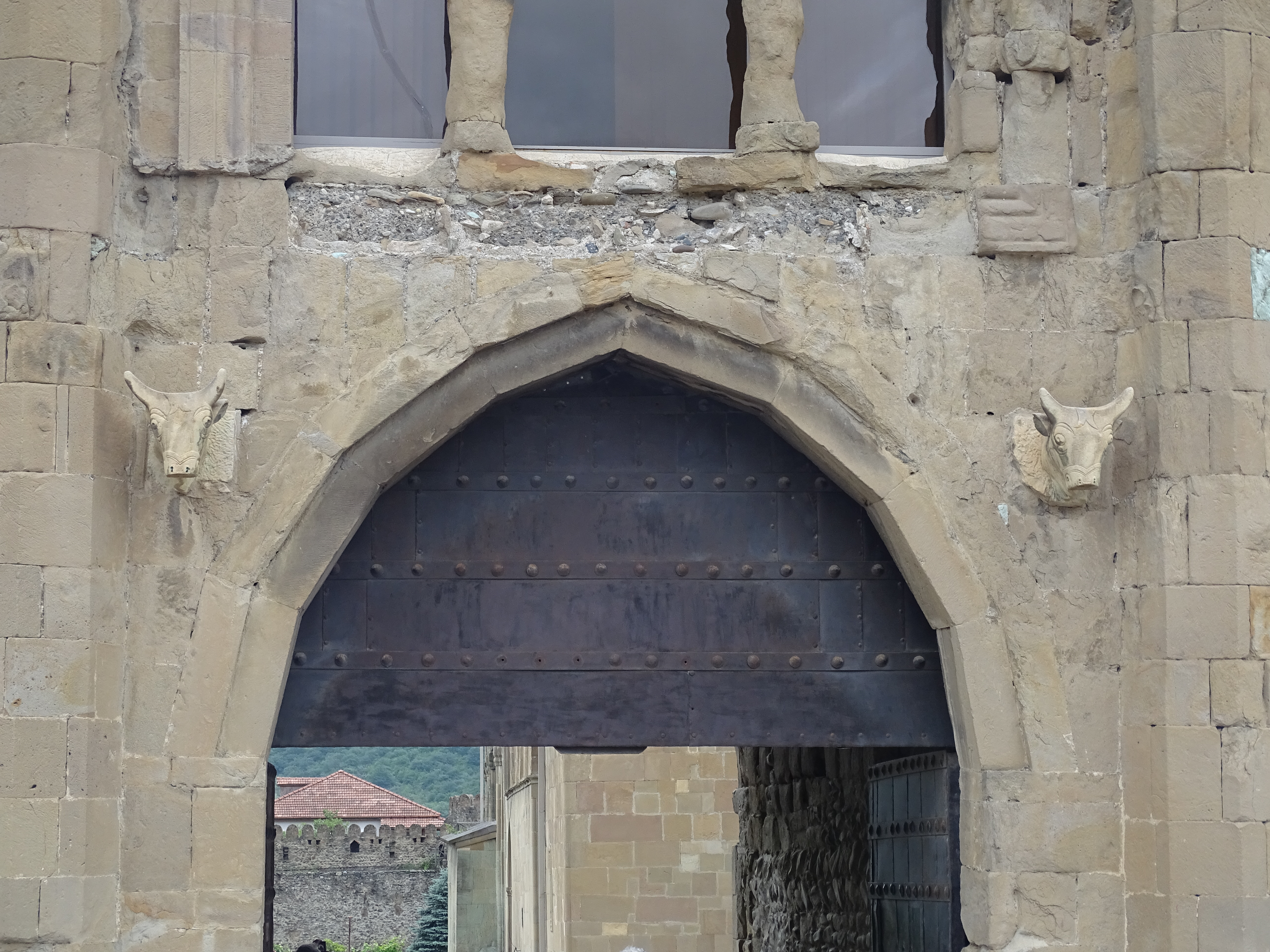
Bulls' heads on the west door of the wall surrounding the cathedral

The cathedral stands in the middle of the large yard, surrounded by high walls with towers, dating back to 18th century. The top storie was designed for military purposes and has gun emplacements. The entrance to the cathedral from the wall is located to the west. The wall has eight towers: six cylindrical and two square. The remnants of a palace and the 11th century two-stories tower above the gate are found in the southwestern part of the yard. The tower is faced by stones, with archature and two bull heads on the west facade, and has a passage with volt on the ground floor. A writing tells that the tower was built by katolikos Melchisedek.

== Structural issues ==
A 2010 UNESCO report has found that structural issues threaten the overall stability of the cathedral.
