= Kakhetians =

Kakhetians კახელები kakhelebi
- Distribution of the Kakhetian dialect

Total population
- c. 500,000

Regions with significant populations
- Georgia Kakheti: 271 298 (82,9%) (2014)

Languages
- Kakhetian dialect of Georgian language

Religion
- † Georgian Orthodox Church

Kakhetians (Georgian: კახელები, romanized: k'akhelebi) are an ethnographic group of Georgians who speak the Kakhetian dialect of the Georgian language. Kakhetians are the indigenous population of Kakheti, a historical region and fertile valley in eastern Georgia that produces much of the country's wine. Like the general population of Georgia, most Kakhetians are adherents of the Georgian Orthodox Church.

== History ==
Kakheti was an independent principality from the end of the eighth century. It was incorporated into the united Georgian Kingdom at the beginning of the eleventh century, but for less than a decade. Only in the beginning of the twelfth century did Georgian King David the Builder (1089–1125) incorporate Kakheti into his Kingdom successfully. After the collapse of the Georgian realm, Kakheti emerged as an independent separate kingdom.

== See also ==
- Iranian Georgians
- Ingiloy people

== Sources ==
- Allen, William E. D. (1970). Russian Embassies to the Georgian Kings 1589 to 1605. Volume I. Cambridge University Press.
- Bagrationi, Archili (1989). The Dialogue between Teimuraz and Rustveli. Nakaduli.
- Bagrationi, Vakhushti (1973). Description of the Kingdom of Georgia. Sabchota Sakartvelo.
- Egnatashvili, Beri (1989). The New Georgian Chronicle. Nakaduli.
- Lamberti, Arcangelo (2020). Colchide Sacra. Artanuji.
- Mikaberidze, Alexander (2007). Historical Dictionary of Georgia. Scarecrow Press.
- Potto, Vasily (1887). The Caucasian War in Different Essays, Episodes, Legends, and Biographies. volume I. V. A. Berezovski.
- Rayfield, Donald (2013). Edge of Empires: A History of Georgia. Reaktion Books.
- Witsen, Nicolaes (2013). Noord en Oost Tartarye. Universali.
