= Byzantine–Georgian wars =

1014–1204 conflicts

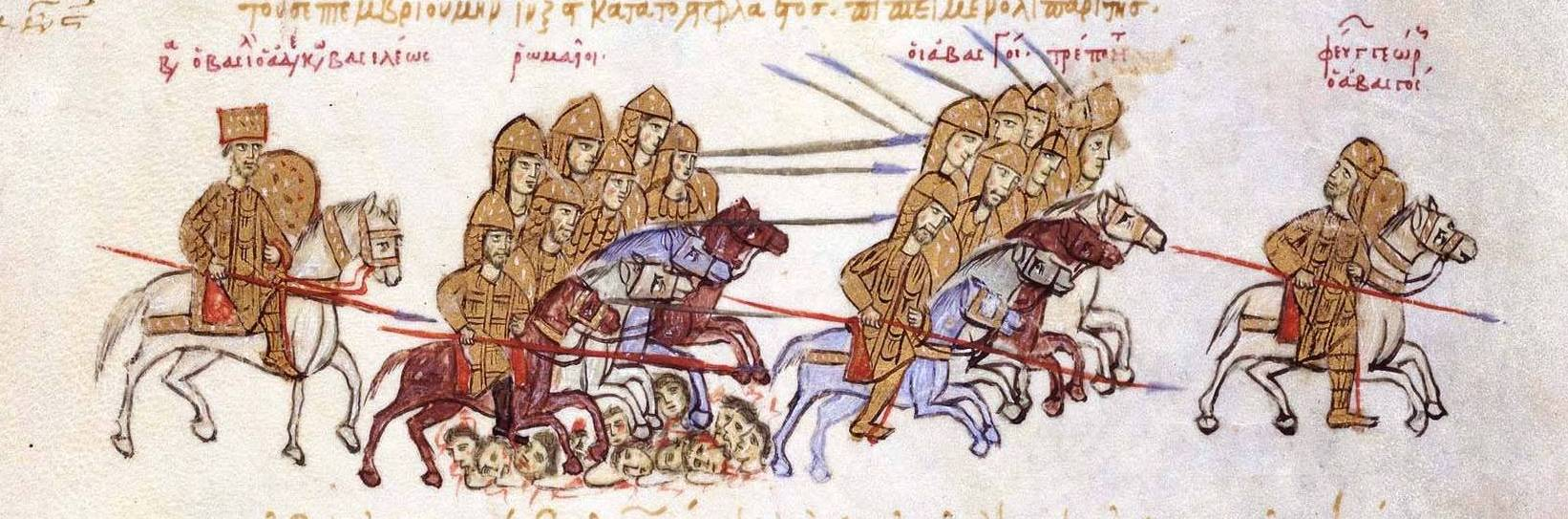
- A miniature depicting the defeat of the Georgian king George I at the Battle of Shirimni. The Skylitzes Chronicle. George is shown as fleeing on horseback on the right and Basil II holding a shield and lance on the left.
Date	1014–1204
Location	Georgian regions of Tao-Klarjeti, South Caucasus and Trebizond.
Result	Georgian victory
Territorial changes	Lost territories reconquered by Queen Tamar

Belligerents
Byzantine Empire	Kingdom of Georgia

Commanders and leaders
Basil II; Constantine VIII; Romanos III Argyros; Liparit IV of Kldekari; Demetrius of Anacopia; Constantine IX Monomachos; Alexios V Doukas	George I Bagrat IV (POW); Tamar the Great; David Komnenos; Alexios I of Trebizond

The Byzantine-Georgian wars (Georgian: ბიზანტია-საქართველოს ომები, romanized: bizant'ia-sakartvelos omebi) were a series of conflicts fought during the 11th-13th centuries over several strategic districts in the Byzantine-Georgian marchlands.

== Background ==
Georgia during the Byzantine Empire, 1045 AD

The integrity of the Byzantine Empire itself was under serious threat after a full-scale rebellion, led by Bardas Skleros, broke out in 976. In the urgency of a situation, Georgian prince David III of Tao aided Basil II and after the decisive loyalist victory at the Battle of Pankaleia, he was rewarded by lifetime rule of key imperial territories in eastern Asia Minor. However, David's rebuff of Basil in Bardas Phocas’ revolt of 987 evoked Constantinople’s distrust of the Georgian rulers. After the failure of the revolt, David was forced to make Basil II the legatee of his extensive possessions.

This agreement destroyed a previous arrangement by which David had made his adopted son, Bagrat III of Georgia, his heir. When David died early in 1001, Basil II added his inheritance – Tao, Theodosiopolis, Phasiane and the Lake Van region (Apahunik) with the city of Manzikert – to the theme of Iberia.

The following year, the Georgian prince Gurgen, the natural father of Bagrat III, marched to take David’s inheritance, but was thwarted by the Byzantine general Nikephoros Ouranos, Dux of Antioch, forcing the successor Georgian Bagratids to recognize the new rearrangement. Despite these setbacks, Bagrat was able to become the first king of the unified Georgian state in 1008. He died in 1014, and his son, George I, inherited a longstanding claim to those territories in Tao which were in Byzantine hands.

== Byzantine–Georgian war (1021–1022) ==
Young and ambitious, George I launched a campaign to restore the David Kuropalates’ succession to Georgia and captured Tao in 1014–1016. He also entered in an alliance with the Fatimid Caliphate of Egypt, Al-Hakim (c.996–1021), that put Basil in a difficult situation, forcing him to refrain from an acute response to George's offensive. Beyond that, the Byzantines were at that time involved in a relentless war with the Bulgar Empire, limiting their actions to the west. But as soon as Bulgaria was conquered in 1018, and Al-Hakim was no longer alive, Basil led his army against Georgia. After a failed first attempt, preparations for a larger-scale campaign against the Kingdom of Georgia were set in train, beginning with the re-fortification of Theodosiopolis. In the autumn of 1021 Basil, at the head of a large army reinforced by the Varangian Guards, attacked the Georgians and their Armenian allies, recovering Phasiane and pushing on beyond the frontiers of Tao into inner Georgia. King George burned the city of Oltisi to keep it out of the enemy's hands and retreated to Kola. A bloody battle was fought near the village Shirimni at the Lake Palakazio (now Çildir, Turkey) on September 11 and the emperor won a costly victory, forcing George I to retreat northwards into his kingdom. Plundering the country on his way, Basil withdrew to winter at Trebizond.

Several attempts to negotiate the conflict went in vain and, in the meantime, George received reinforcements from the Kakhetians, and allied himself with the Byzantine commanders Nicephorus Phocas and Nicephorus Xiphias in their abortive insurrection in the emperor's rear. In December, George's ally, the Armenian king Senekerim of Vaspurakan, being harassed by the Seljuk Turks, surrendered his kingdom to the emperor. During the spring of 1022, Basil launched a final offensive, winning a crushing victory over the Georgians at Svindax. Menaced both by land and sea, King George handed over Tao, Phasiane, Kola, Artaan and Javakheti, and left his infant son Bagrat a hostage in Basil's hands.

== Byzantine–Georgian war (1028) ==
Shortly after Bagrat IV's ascension to the throne, Constantine VIII sent in an army to take over the key city-fortress of Artanuji on behalf of the Georgian Bagratid prince Demetrius, son of Gurgen of Klarjeti, who had been dispossessed by Bagrat IV's grandfather, Bagrat III, of his patrimonial fief at Artanuji early in the 1010s. Several Georgians nobles defected to the Byzantines, but Bagrat's loyal subjects put up a stubborn fight. The Byzantines overran the Georgian borderlands and besieged Kldekari, a key fortress in Trialeti province, but failed to take it and marched back on the region Shavsheti. The local bishop Saba of Tbeti organized a successful defense of the area forcing the Byzantines to change their tactics.

The emperor Constantine VIII then sent Demetrius of Anacopia, an exiled Georgian prince, who was considered by many as a legitimate pretender to the throne, to take a Georgian crown by force. Constantine's death in 1028 rendered the Byzantine invasion abortive, and, in 1030, the regent, queen dowager Mariam paid a visit to the new emperor Romanos III (c.1028–1034). She negotiated a peace treaty, and returned with the high Byzantine title of Curopalates for Bagrat in 1032. Mariam also brought him a Byzantine princess Helena as wife.

== Georgian civil wars ==
=== Demetrius of Anacopia ===
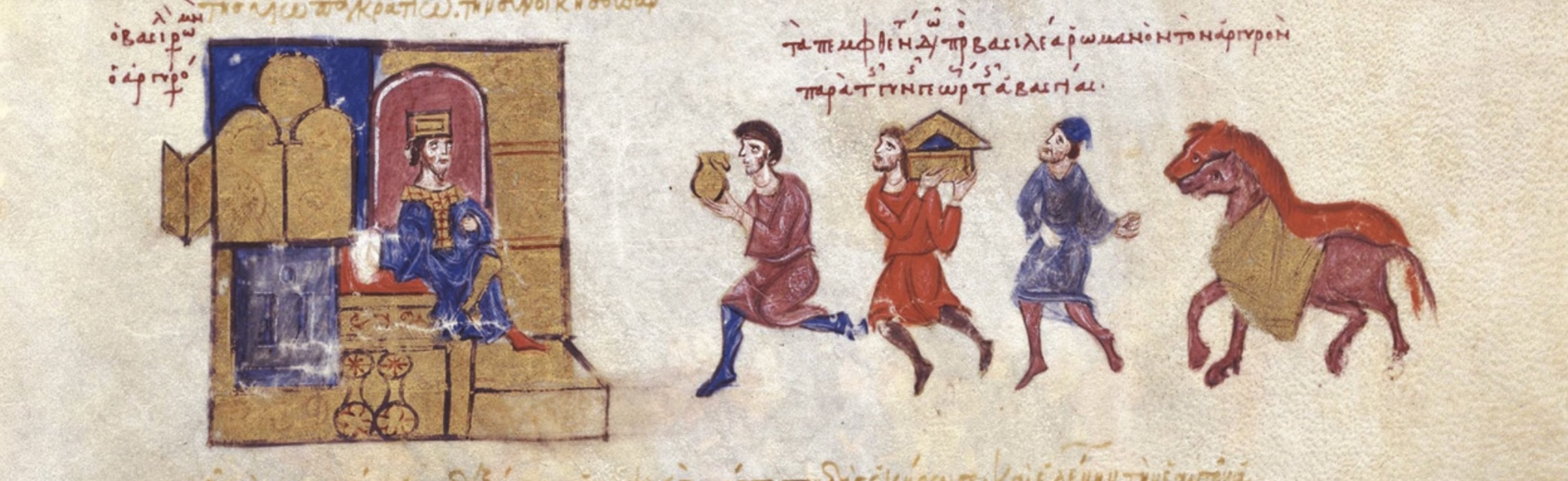
Georgian ambassadors presenting gifts to emperor Romanos III. The Skylitzes Chronicle.

In 1033, the royal court faced another dynastic trouble, this time with Bagrat's half-brother Demetrius of Anacopia, a son of George I of his second marriage with Alda of Alania. Demetrius and Alda lived in Anacopia, a fortress in Abkhazia, which had been bequeathed to them by the late king George I. The efforts by Bagrat's mother Mariam to win Demetrius's loyalty to the crown went in vain. Threatened by Bagrat, Alda defected to the Byzantines and surrendered Anacopia to the emperor Romanos III in 1033, who honored her son Demetrius with the rank of magistros. According to The Georgian Chronicles: King Bagrat defeated a united army of his opponents and then besieged Anacopia, then he went back, leaving Otago Chachasdze and his army to take charge of the fortress.

=== Liparit IV of Kldekari ===
In 1038 Liparit IV, Duke of Kldekari was on the verge of capturing the Georgian city of Tbilisi, which had been under the Muslim sway for centuries; but fearing his growing power the Georgian nobles thwarted the plan and persuaded the king to make peace with the emir of Tbilisi. As a result, Liparit turned into a sworn enemy of Bagrat and began actively cooperating with foreign powers for vengeance. In 1039, he pledged his support to Bagrat's half-brother Demetrius of Anacopia who returned to Georgia with a Byzantine army to seize the crown.

Pretenders enjoyed numerous successes against the royal armies, despite their efforts to take a key fortress Ateni went in vain, Liparit and the Byzantines won a major victory at the Battle of Sasireti, where Bagrat suffered a crushing defeat and was forced to withdraw from his eastern possessions to take refuge in the western Georgian highlands. However Demetrius died unexpectedly in 1042. Alda, with Demetrius's son David, fled to her native Alania. Liparit continued the struggle against Bagrat and became a major champion of the Byzantine influence in the region.

Bagrat appealing to the emperor Constantine IX, it was arranged, through the Byzantine mediation, that Liparit should receive nearly a half of the realm (south of the Mtkvari River) only as a dutiful subject to the king of Georgia. Thus, in the period of 1045–1048, Liparit IV, Duke of Trialeti, Argveti, Lower and Upper Iberia, Prince-Constable of Georgia, became the most powerful person in the kingdom. Not without a good reason, the Arab chronicler Ibn al-Athir calls him "king of the Abasgians [i.e. Georgians]." Liparit, called Liparites by Byzantine writers, was at the same time a Byzantine dignitary with the prestigious rank of magistros (and possibly also curopalates).

During the Seljuk campaigns in Anatolia in 1048, Liparit, who had been fighting on the Byzantine side, was captured at the Battle of Kapetron. Bagrat took advantage of this, and returned to his eastern possessions. The king's fortunes were quickly reversed, however, upon Liparit's return from captivity in 1049 or 1051. The rebellious duke forced Bagrat to flee to Constantinople where he was kept, as a result of Liparit's intrigues, for three years. In the absence of Bagrat (1050–1053), Liparit was an effective ruler of Georgia; he even installed Bagrat's son George II as king and declared himself a regent. After Bagrat's return in 1053, Liparit again warred against him. Eventually, in 1060, he was arrested by his followers and surrendered to the king, who forced him into a monastery under the name of Anton. Liparit died shortly thereafter at Constantinople and was reburied to his patrimonial monastery at Katskhi in Georgia.

=== Peace ===
The second half of the 11th century was marked by the strategically significant invasion of the Seljuq Turks, who by the end of the 1040s had succeeded in building a vast empire including most of Central Asia and Persia. The Seljuk threat prompted the Georgian and Byzantine governments to seek a closer cooperation. To secure the alliance, Bagrat's daughter Maria married, at some point between 1066 and 1071, to the Byzantine co-emperor Michael VII Ducas.

== Georgian expedition to Chaldia and the founding of the Trebizond Empire ==
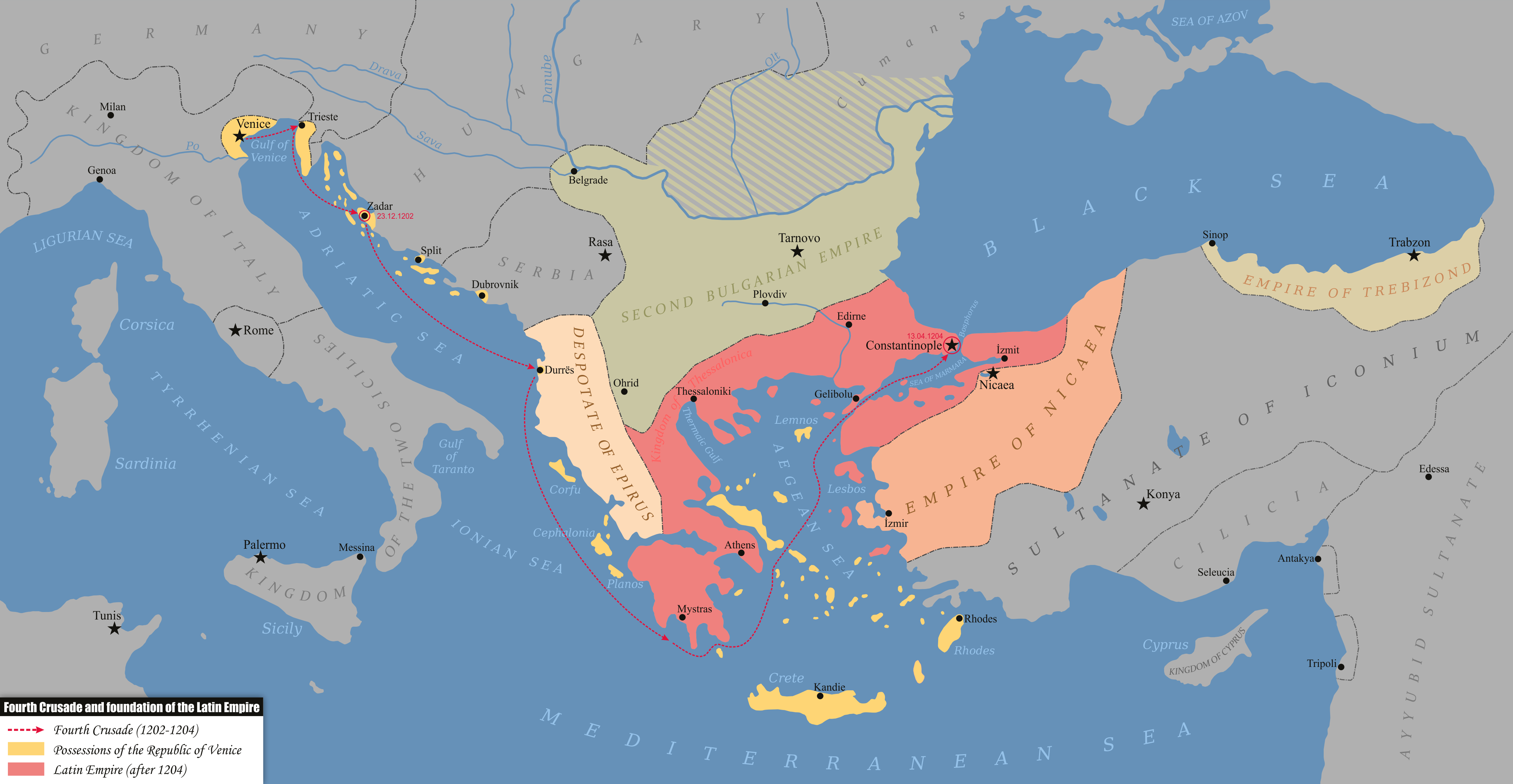
The path of the Fourth Crusade and the political situation of what once was the Byzantine Empire in 1204 AD.

Despite the territorial losses to Basil II, the Georgian kings succeeded in retaining their independence and in uniting most of the Georgian lands into a single state. Many of the territories ceded to the empire were conquered by the Seljuk Turks towards the 1070s-1080s, securing the theme of Iberia by the help of Byzantine governor, Gregory Pakourianos, who began to evacuate the region shortly after the disaster inflicted by the Seljuks on the Byzantine army at Manzikert. On this occasion, George II of Georgia was bestowed with the Byzantine title of Caesar, granted the fortress of Kars and put in charge of the Imperial Eastern limits.

Relations between the two Christian monarchies were then generally peaceful except for the episode of 1204, when Emperor Alexios III Angelos seized a sizable donation of the then Georgian Queen Tamar, that was meant for the monks of Mount Athos. Infuriated by this action, Tamar used this hostile act as a pretext for her expansion along the southwestern coast of the Black Sea, populated by a large Georgian-speaking population.

Tamar's ambitions were aided by the ongoing Fourth Crusade, which eventually fractured the Byzantine Empire.

A Georgian army under the command of Alexios and David Komnenos attacked the Byzantines from the east in late March or early April 1204. According to Georgian chronicles the expedition took eight days, it reached Trebizond via Lazona and seized Trebizond in April. The local commander doux Nikephoros Palaiologos, did not put up an effective defence against the Georgian forces.

On April 13, 1204, Constantinople fell to the Crusaders, where they established the Latin Empire. According to medieval sources, newly incorporated territories were given to Alexios and David Komnenos, where they founded a pro-Georgian state, the Empire of Trebizond. Alexios was proclaimed emperor, while David was appointed strategos. Some scholars believe that the new state was subject to Georgia, at least in the first years of its existence, at the beginning of the 13th century.

The following year, David Komnenos commanded the Georgian troops in a successful campaign that resulted in the conquest of territories between Trebizond and Heraclea Pontica, while Alexios defeated the Seljuks and recaptured Amisos, Sinope, Oinaion and Chalybia.

Tamar's political involvement in the Fourth Crusade, her exploitation of the Byzantine decline, and military campaigns, decisively expanded the Kingdom of Georgia's influence and number of tributaries, turning her kingdom into one of the most powerful Christian states at the time.

== David VI's campaign of Trebizond ==
In the second half of the 13th century, when the political integrity of Georgia was broken and the state was divided into two kingdoms, Georgian influence in the Empire of Trebizond began to decline, and pro-Byzantine tendencies appeared in separate groups of the ruling circles of Trebizond. This resulted in a struggle for political hegemony in the Empire of Trebizond between the Georgian and Byzantine parties that lasted for years. In 1281, a coup took place in Trebizond, organized by the Georgian party. Emperor John II, who became the son-in-law of the royal house of the Byzantine Palaiologos, was deposed from the throne and even captured. Then he was released from prison, but he was not allowed to stay in Trebizond, and the deposed king went to Constantinople. In 1282, during John's absence from Trebizond, his relative, King David VI Narin of Georgia (David I of Imereti), tried to restore Georgian influence in the empire and besieged the capital. After the failure of the siege, the Georgian army occupied several provinces of the empire, including the historical Chaneti (Lazeti), and helped John's sister Theodora, daughter of Manuel I and his second wife Rusudan, to seize power, though soon in 1285 John II returned to the empire and regained power, and Queen Theodora took refuge in Georgia.

== Trapezuntine Civil Wars ==
In the subsequent Trepizuntine civil war the Greek party, supported by the Genoese, and by Byzantine mercenaries were opposed by the local nobles, who considered themselves the patriotic champions of native rights. The opposition persuaded Anna, called Anachoutlou, the elder daughter of Emperor Alexios II of Trebizond and his Georgian wife Jiajak Jaqeli, to quit her monastic dress and escape to Lazia, where she was crowned empress and gained control over the region, and all the native Laz and the Tzan people, recognised her as the legal heir to the throne for being nearest legitimate heir of her brother Basil.

On July 17, 1341, Anna entered Trebizond triumphantly, followed by Laz warriors of the Georgian King George V (1314–1346) as well as by Trapezuntine Laz of the bandon of Greater Lazia, and ascended to the throne. She was crowned empress, supported, on the one hand, by the Amytzantarios family and, on the other, by the Laz, the Tzan and, in general, the people of the provinces of the Empire of Trebizond. The prevalence of the indigenous Amytzantarioi after Anna's ascension to the throne had provoked continuous attempts by the opposing Scholarioi to overthrow her with the support of other noble families.

The conflicts between the aristocratic families of Trebizond marked the reign of Anna, who was continuously under the threat of being deposed by the Scholarios family, as well as other aristocratic circles related to Constantinople. The attempts of the Scholarios family were supported by Constantinople, which was disappointed with the fall of Eirene Palaiologina and the ascent of Anna.

== See also ==
- David III of Tao
- Iberia (theme)
