= Kldekari Fortress =

- Georgian: კლდეკარის ციხესიმაგრე
- Near Manglisi in Georgia
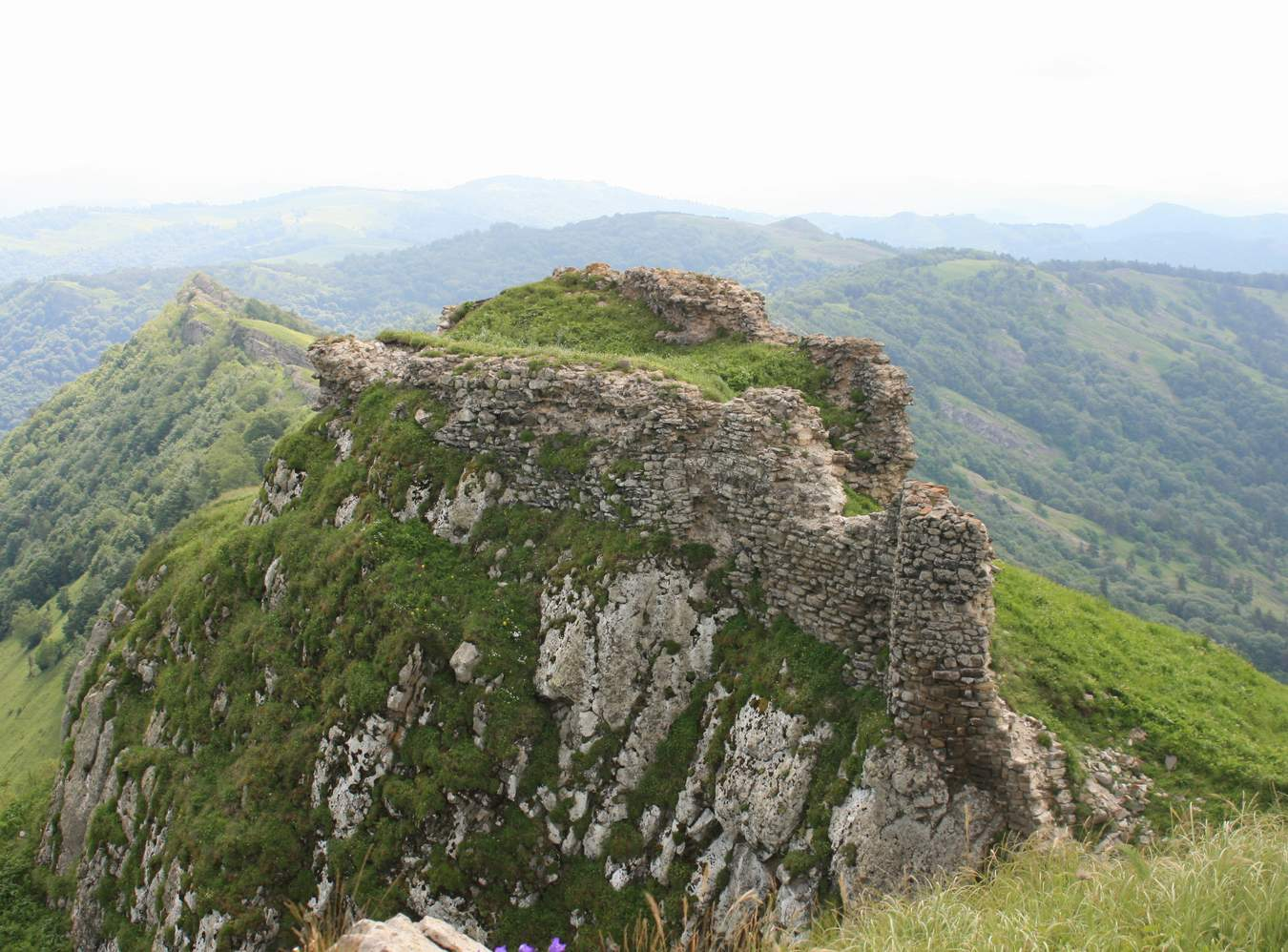
- Kldekari Fortress.

Site information
- Type: fortress
- Open to the public: yes
- Condition: ruins

Location
- Coordinates: 41°44′33″N 44°12′33″E

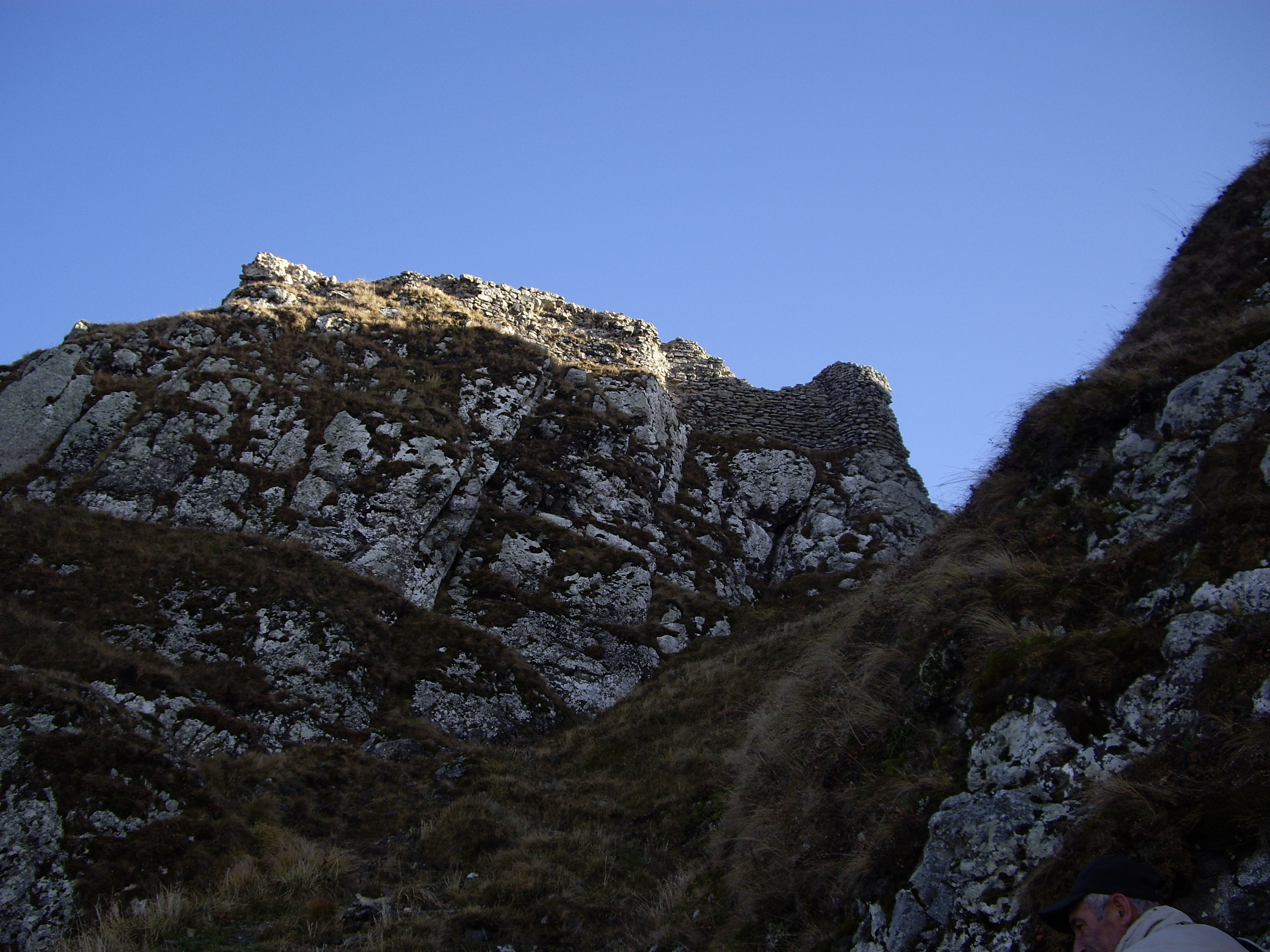
View of Kldekari Fortress from below

Kldekari Fortress (Georgian: კლდეკარის ციხესიმაგრე) is a historical fortress in Georgia, Trialeti, on a rocky peak of Trialeti Range near spa town Manglisi, Tetritsqaro Municipality. From here you can see the area around the south, Tsalka and Manglisi, as well as the north - river Tana and Tedzami Valleys. The fortress ruins are currently preserved. It was located at an important crossroads, where a molten rock formed an exit; the name Kldekari means the rock door.

Kldekari Fortress was built after the Argveti feudal lord Liparit I Baghvashi in IX century moved to Trialeti in the 70s. For the next two centuries it was the center of Kldekari Saeristavo. Unable to cope with the growing political power of the Liparitids, the Georgian royal government seized Kldekari Fortress several times.

== History ==
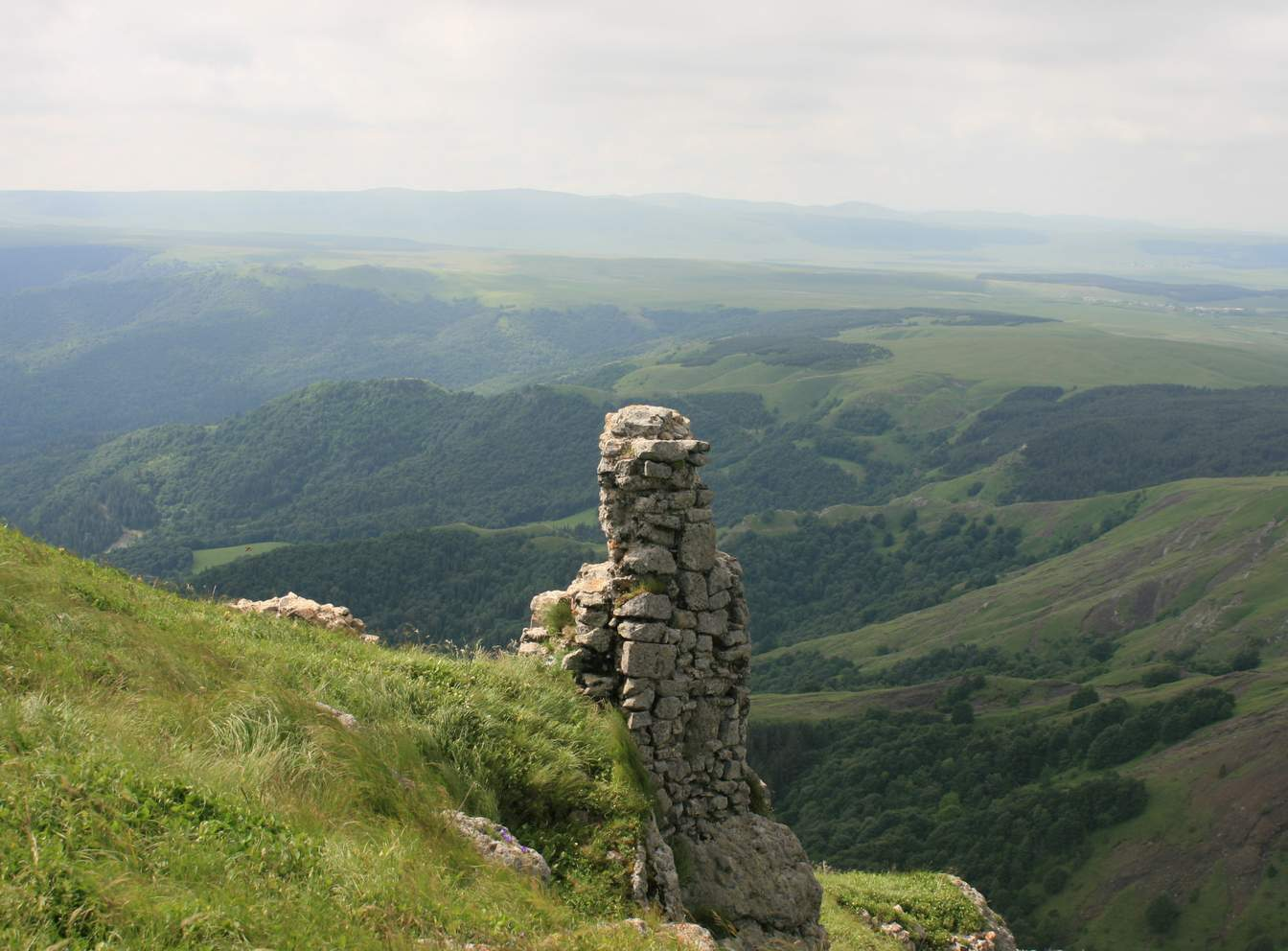
Kldekari Fortress. View from Kldekari to Algeti Valley.

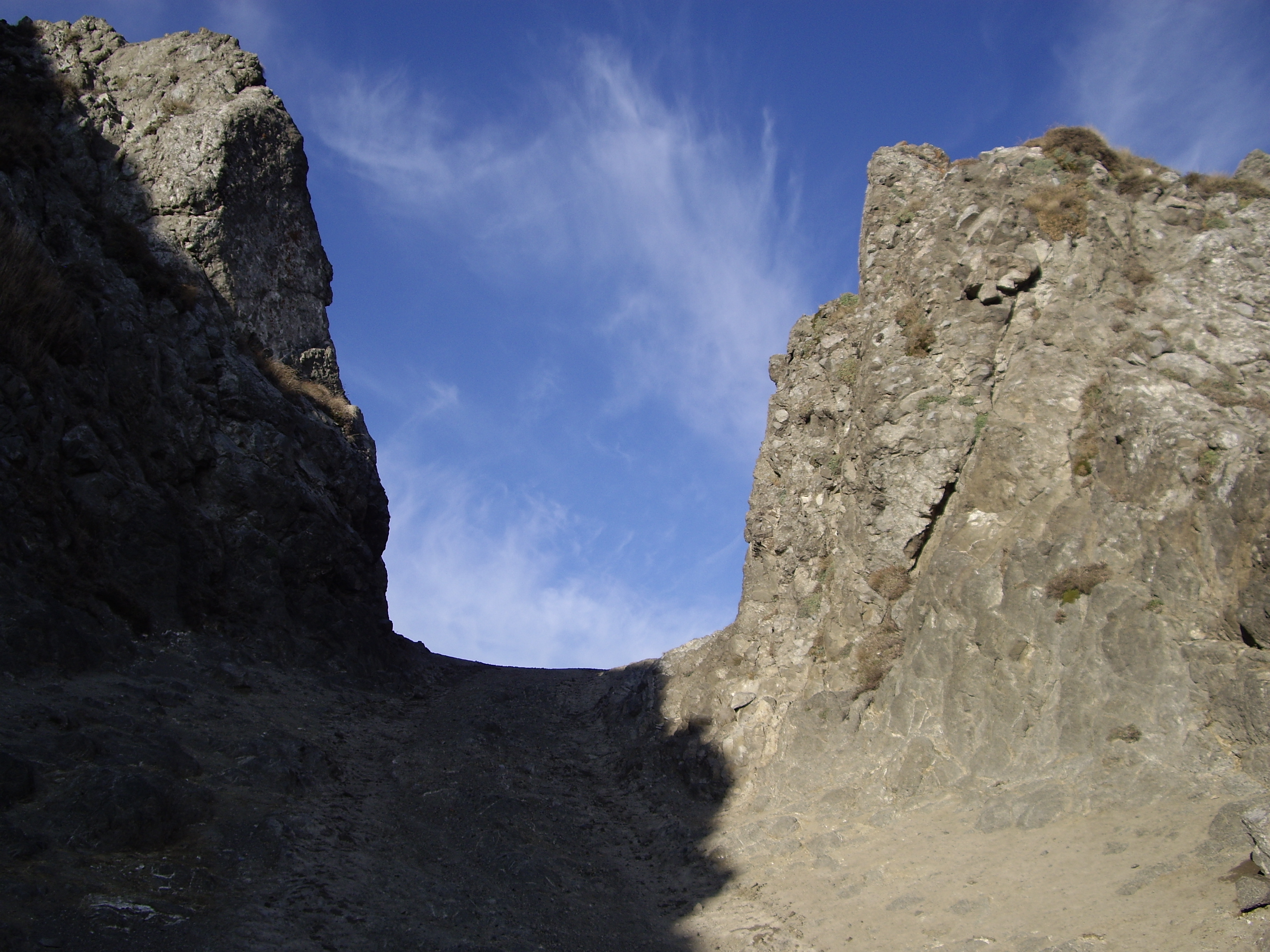
Kldekari Natural Door

The eristavis of Kldekar then become so powerful that they even opposed the kings. The fighter for the unification of Georgia Bagrat III, who was patronized by David III Kuropalates, did not obey the eristavi of Kldekar Rati I. Bagrat did not want to go against a strong father. When David allowed Bagrat to act as he pleased, he launched an army but fighting Rati I in the Kldekari Fortress was not an easy task. The king chose to act and to go on a direct offensive. He first moved from Trialeti to western Georgia, and when winter came, suddenly stood on top of Rati with his whole army. Rati was not ready to meet his foe in battle, and therefore chose to surrender without a fight. He came out of the prison, took his son Liparit with him, and begged the king to spare their lives. The king captured the castle, while Rati went to Argveti, which was also part of his estate.

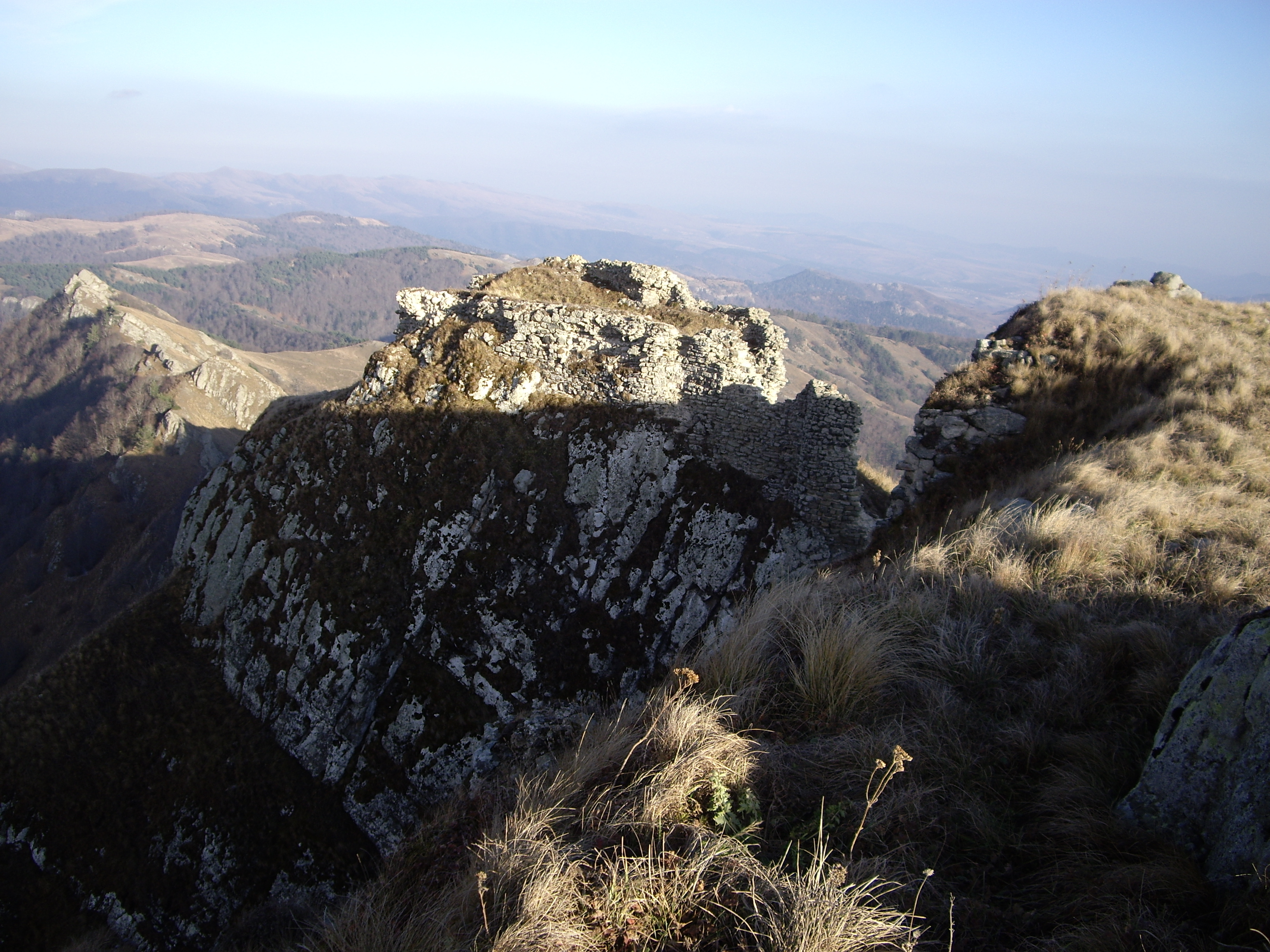
View of Kldekari Fortress from above

The battle between the king and the eristavis of Kldekar intensified especially in the late 1020s. It lasted for several decades, with reversals of fortune on both sides.

The owner of Kldekar Fortress, Eristavi Liparit Baghvashi IV was a staunch supporter of Bagrat IV of Georgia until they ended up in a feud, whose outcome was ultimately decided during the Battle of Sasireti. When, in 1028, the Byzantine emperor Constantine VIII sent Commander Parakimanos to Georgia in order to conquer the kingdom with a large army, threatening the fortress of Kldekar, Liparit IV of Kldekari fiercely resisted the enemy and forced Parakimanos to retreat.

In the following years, a rift broke out between Liparit IV of Kldekari and Bagrat IV of Georgia. In the late 1050s, after a decisive victory during Battle of Sasireti Liparit IV became the ruler of almost all of Eastern Georgia and supervised the upbringing of the prince, and crowned the minor George II of Georgia in Ruisi cathedral as King of Georgia.

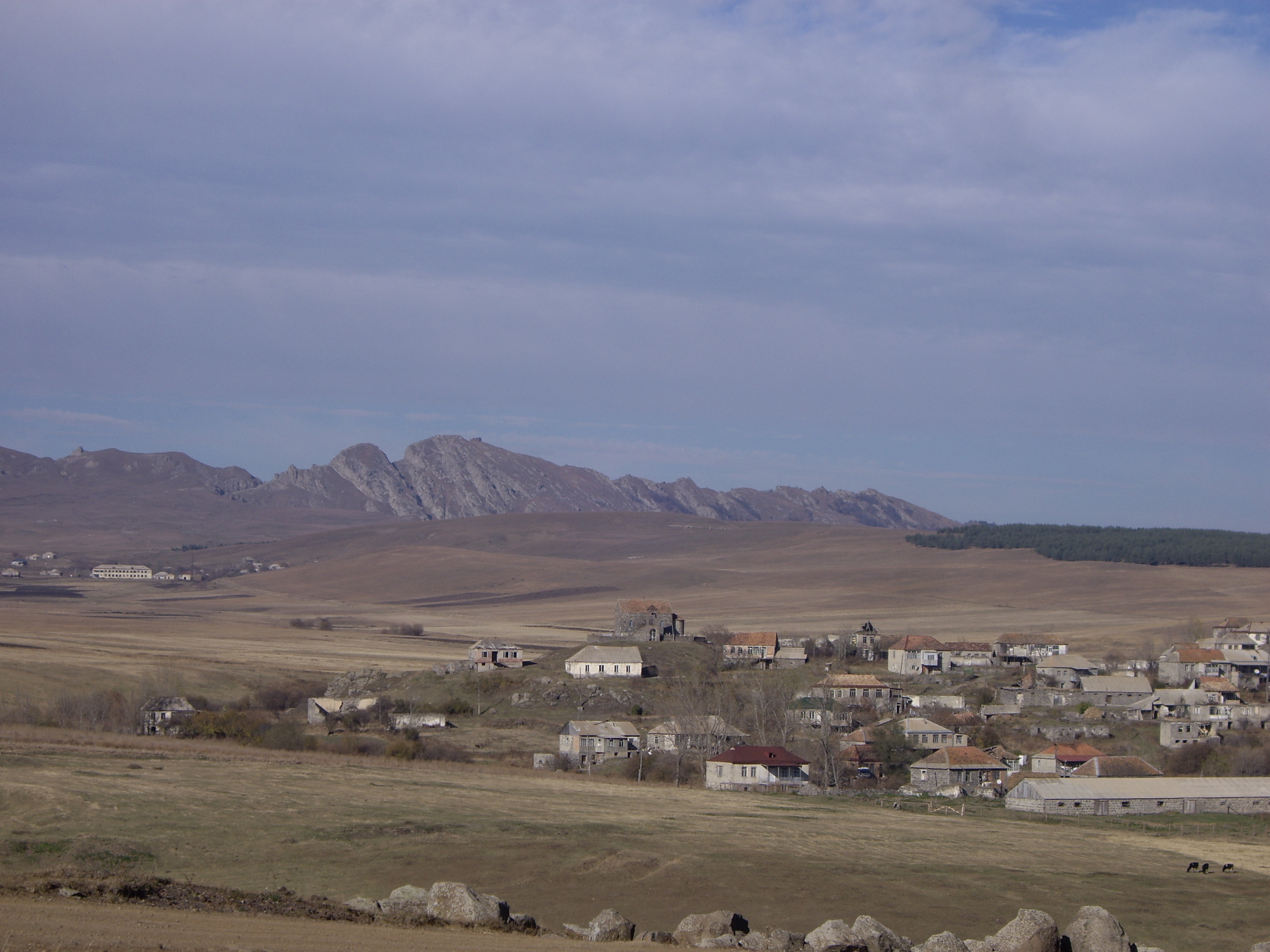
View of Kldekari from afar

The domination of Liparit gave rise to much discontent among the other nobles. They intended to get rid of him. Sula Kalmakheli, with the help of others, captured Liparit and succeeded his son Ivan and the king. The overjoyed king greatly rewarded the rebellious slave invaders. Sula Lipari took away strong forts such as Artanuji, Uplistsikhe, Birtvisi and Kvelistsikhe, but even the king's army could not take Kldekar. Only after the king promised the peasants that he would release Liparit and his son Ivan safely did the castle surrender. The king imprisoned his army, forced Liparit to become a monk, and left Ivan to rule Argveti in his father's place.

In the following years, Ivan recaptured Kldekar Castle. But the conditions under which this return took place remain unclear. In the 1070s, the newly enthroned George II of Georgia was overthrown by noble officials, including Ivan Liparit's son. The king subdued the rebels, but rewarded them instead of punishing them; in particular, he asked Ivan Samshvilde. Ivan could not be treated well and after that he ousted the king several times again.

David the Builder reigned in the late 1080's. According to his historian, "outside the prisons" the man was nowhere to be found and the buildings were destroyed. Many princes did not obey the king. Only Kldekar and its surrounding area, which occupied Liparit, were loyal to David this time. But this allegiance did not last long. In 1094, David captured Liparit and expelled him from Greece after two years in prison. Kldekari Saeristavo was even abolished. Clearly, even the castle of Kldekar once lost its old strength. According to the same historian, at the beginning of the 12th century, Trialeti and Kldekari were occupied by the daughter of Chkondideli, someone named Tevdore.

A very unpleasant fact was witnessed in the castle of Kldekar in 1177: as it is known, George III rebelled against his nephew Demna of Georgia, who was supported by many nobles. The main stronghold among them was the Orbeliani clan. If Libra leaned on the side of the conspirators in the early days, the situation soon changed - the king defeated them. The rebels were severely punished, and Demna herself was lapidated.

In the following centuries, the Duchy of Kldekari played a lesser role in the political life of Georgia, which is why their name is rarely found in the pages of chronicles. So, for example, when David Ulu, who had returned to Georgia in the middle of the 13th century, learned that Torghva Pankeli had abandoned him as the ruler of Kakheti, he requested the latter's presence at his side several times. The frightened Torghva did not appear before the king. He then swore an oath to Khornabujel, who brought him to the king's house in Tabakhmela. There, Torghva was betrayed by a guest called Jikur, caught, sent to a cliff, and thrown from a rock.

In the late feudal era, the Kldekar Saeristavo ceased to exist. That is why Kldekar itself is seldom if ever mentioned in historical sources.

== See also ==
- Duchy of Kldekari
- Liparitids
- Liparit IV of Kldekari
- Demna of Georgia
- Kldekari (mountain)
