= Byzantine–Georgian war (1028) =

Military conflict between the Byzantine Empire and the Kingdom of Georgia

Byzantine–Georgian War (1028)
- Part of the Byzantine–Georgian wars
- Georgia during the Byzantine Empire, 1045 AD
Date	1028
Location	Georgian regions of Tao-Klarjeti, Javakheti, Trialeti
Result	Georgian victory: Byzantine–Georgian treaty of 1031

Belligerents
Kingdom of Georgia	Byzantine Empire

Commanders and leaders
Bagrat IV; Liparit IV of Kldekari	Constantine VIII

Strength
Unknown	Unknown

The Byzantine–Georgian War (1028) was a military conflict between the Byzantine Empire and the Kingdom of Georgia, primarily over territorial control in southern Georgia. The conflict occurred shortly after Bagrat IV ascended the throne of Georgia in 1028, during a period of political instability in Georgia.

== Background ==
After the death of George I, some Georgian nobles wished to enthrone Prince Demetrius instead of his half-brother Bagrat IV. Taking advantage of internal divisions within Georgia, the Byzantine emperor supported Demetrius’s claim to the Georgian throne, aiming to restore Byzantine influence in the Caucasus through his assistance to Demetrius. Moreover, Byzantium also sought to gain control over Georgia’s wealthy southern territories.

== Military Campaigns ==
The Byzantine forces swiftly overran Artaani, a region in south Georgia, before advancing into the strategic areas of Javakheti and Trialeti. One of their primary military objectives was the capture of the strategically important Kldekari Fortress, situated in the Trialeti Mountains. The fortress, however, was fiercely defended by Liparit IV of Kldekari, a prominent Georgian noble and military leader. Liparit mounted a determined resistance, repelling the invading Byzantine forces and securing a significant victory for the Georgians in this encounter.

Following their failure at Kldekari, the Byzantine army redirected its focus toward Shavsheti, a mountainous region in southern Georgia with considerable strategic importance. The Byzantines aimed to capture the key military strongholds in the area but encountered strong resistance from the local population, led by Bishop Saba Mtbevari, a prominent religious figure. Bishop Saba rallied the inhabitants and organized a successful defense, preventing the Byzantines from establishing a foothold in Shavsheti and thwarting their efforts to expand territorial control.

Although the Byzantines suffered significant military setbacks in these engagements, they ultimately failed to achieve their strategic objectives in Georgia. The internal political situation within the Georgian kingdom, however, began to deteriorate in the aftermath of the campaign. Ongoing conflict and instability were exacerbated by the betrayal of several local nobles. Disillusioned with King Bagrat IV's leadership, some Georgian aristocrats defected to the Byzantines, surrendering their fortresses and territories.

== Conclusion ==
The Byzantine military campaign ended in 1028 following the death of Constantine VIII. His successor, Romanos III, decided to abandon the military efforts in Georgia and instead pursue diplomatic relations with the Georgian kingdom. In 1030, Queen Mariam of Vaspurakan, the regent of Georgia and mother of Bagrat IV, traveled to Constantinople to negotiate peace with Romanos III. As a result of these negotiations, a peace treaty was signed between the Byzantine Empire and Georgia, and Bagrat IV was granted the high title of Curopalates by the Byzantine emperor. Additionally, Mariam arranged a marriage between her son, Bagrat IV, and a Byzantine princess, Helena Argyre, further strengthening the ties between the two states.

== Bibliography ==
- Kopaliani, Vasili (1969). Political Relations Between Georgia and Byzantium in the Years 970–1070. Tbilisi: Tbilisi University Press.
- Lortkipanidze, Mariam; Japaridze, Otar; Muskhelishvili, David; Metreveli, Roin (2012). History of Georgia in four volumes, vol. II - History of Georgia from the 4th century to the 13th century. Tbilisi: National Academy of Sciences of Georgia. ISBN 978-9941-19-585-3.
- Javakhishvili, Ivane (2012). History of the Georgian Nation. Vol. 2. Tbilisi: Palitra L. ISBN 978-9941-19-810-6.
- Samushia, Jaba (2001). Georgia–Byzantine Relations in 1027–1089. Tbilisi: Ivane Javakhishvili Tbilisi State University Press.
