= Battle of Svindax =

Battle in Turkey in 1022

- Part of the Byzantine–Georgian wars
Date	1022
Location	Svindax, Phasiane (now northeast Turkey) 39°54′N 41°36′E
Result	Byzantine victory: Treaty of 1022

Belligerents
Byzantine Empire	Kingdom of Georgia

Commanders and leaders
Basil II	George I

Strength
Unknown	Unknown
- Location within Turkey Battle of Svindax (Caucasus Mountains)

The Battle of Svindax (Georgian: სვინდაქსის ბრძოლა) was fought during the spring of 1022 between the Byzantine army of Emperor Basil II and the Georgian army of King George I.

== History ==
The battle was fought at Svindax (a medieval Georgian chronicler knew it as სვინდაქსი, Suindaksi) in the Phasiane province (Basiani, Basian, or Basean). Ultimately, the Byzantines won a decisive victory. In the aftermath of the conflict, George I of Georgia was forced to negotiate a peace treaty ending the Byzantine-Georgian wars over the succession of the domains of David III of Tao.

== See also ==
- Battle of Shirimni
- Battle of Sasireti
- Tao-Klarjeti
