= Katskhi Monastery =

Monastery in Katskhi, Georgia

Katskhi Nativity of the Savior Monastery
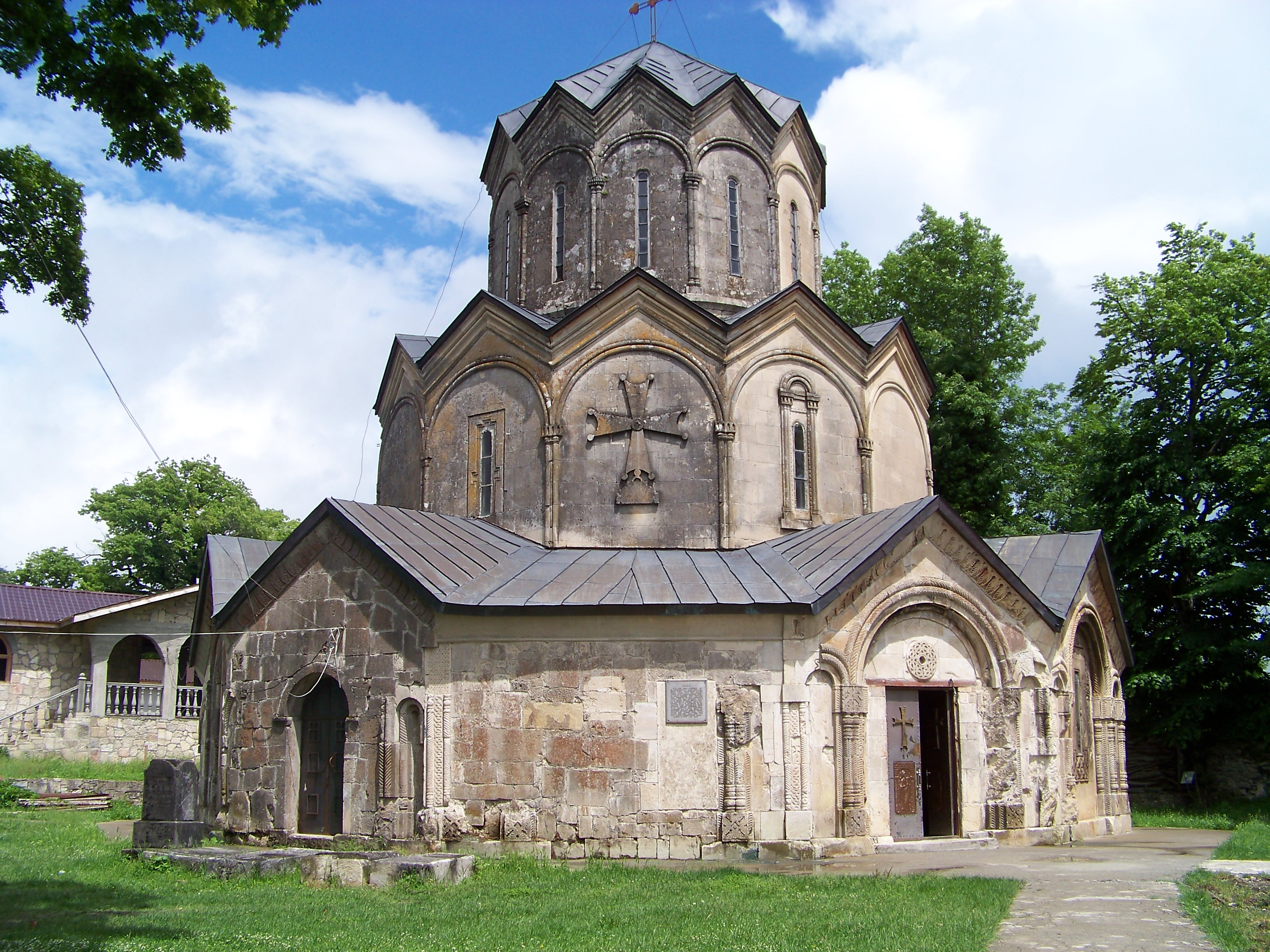
- Katskhi Monastery

- Location within Georgia

Religion
- Affiliation: Georgian Orthodox Church
- District: Argveti District (historic); Chiatura District (present)
- Region: Caucasus
- Status: Active

Location
- Location: Katskhi, 3.5 miles from the town of Chiatura, Chiatura District, Imereti Province (Mkhare), Georgia
- Coordinates: 42.2694°N 43.2131°E

Architecture
- Type: Triple-tiered domed octagonal plan
- Style: Georgian; Monastery
- Founder: Rati, a nobleman of the house of Liparitids (Baguashi)
- Funded by: Liparitid (Baguashi) family
- Groundbreaking: ca. 988
- Completed: 1010–1014

Specifications
- Length: 13.5 m (44 ft)
- Width: 12 m (39 ft)
- Height (max): 17.5 m
- Dome: 1; rests upon the third tier drum

The Katskhi Monastery of Nativity of the Savior (Georgian: კაცხის მაცხოვრის შობის სახელობის მონასტერი), more commonly known as the Katskhi Monastery (კაცხის მონასტერი) is a medieval monastery in Georgia, located in the village of Katskhi near the town of Chiatura. It was built at the behest of the Baguashi family in the period of 988–1014. The church building is noted for a hexagonal design and rich ornamentation. Closed down by the Soviet government in 1924, the monastery was revived in 1990 and is now operated by the Eparchy of Sachkhere and Chiatura of the Georgian Orthodox Church.

== Architecture ==
The Katskhi monastery is an octagonal building of more complex design than other similar polygonal Georgian monuments such as Gogiuba, Kiagmis-alty, Oltisi, and Bochorma. The exterior of the church features three gradually narrowing cylindrical levels formed by the faceted gallery, the main body of the church, and the drum of the dome.

The six apses are inscribed into the outer polyhedron and surrounded by an ambulatory from all sides. An inscription from the ambulatory mentions the certain "Tskhovreba, daughter of Ioann, Duke of Dukes". A single spacious interior compartment around the subdome bay includes radially oriented semi-circular apses. One of these, the altar apse, projects outward prominently due to its large bema. The drum of the dome is also faceted. Each facet of the main body of the church as well as that of the dome and gallery terminate in a pediment with three lines of polygonal cornices.

The building was richly ornated, but the decoration of two upper tiers was lost in the process of the 1854 restoration. Of note is a large composition in relief at the southern vestibule of the gallery, the Exaltation of the Holy Cross, featuring a cross supported by four angels.

The church is surrounded by a pentagonal wall, which contains a free-standing bell tower in its eastern corner. These structures are later additions, probably from the 17th or 18th century.

== History ==
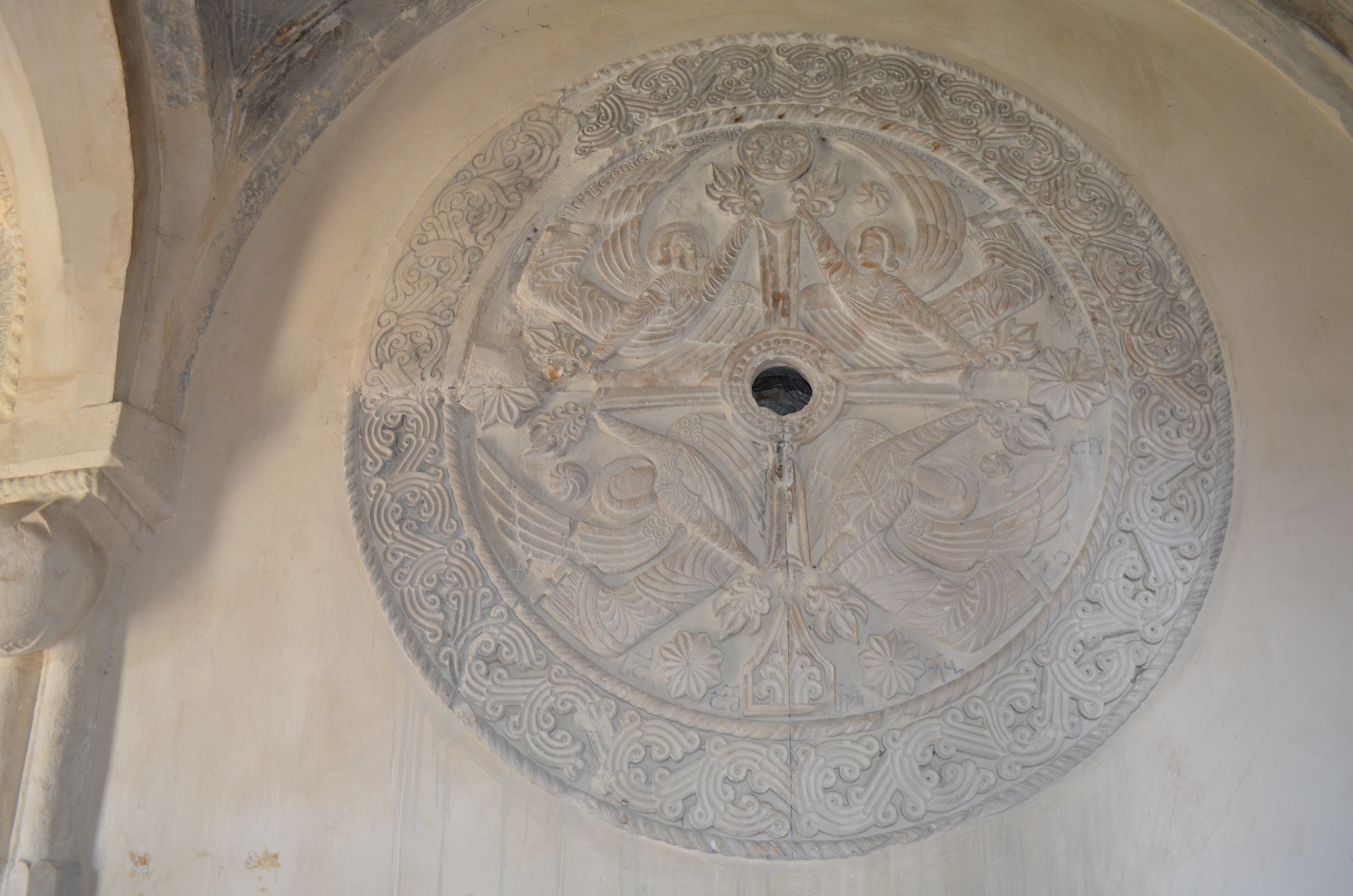
The Exaltation of the Holy Cross, a relief from Katskhi

The Katskhi monastery is located in the medieval district of Argveti, later part of Imereti. It was built in honor of the Holy Trinity at the behest of the late 10th-century nobleman Rati, of the house of Liparitids (Baguashi), who settled down in Argveti c. 988 after losing his stronghold of Kldekari to the Georgian Bagratids. The construction was completed around 1010–1014 in the reign of King Bagrat III of Georgia as suggested by a tympanum inscription over the south-western entrance. In the following centuries, Katskhi served as a familial abbey and burial ground for the Liparitids. According to the Georgian chronicles, the once-powerful Liparit IV was buried there after his death in exile in the Byzantine Empire.

After the downfall of the Liparitid dynasty in the 11th century, the Katskhi monastery fell into oblivion. It reemerged from obscurity early in the 16th century, when Katskhi was granted by Bagrat III of Imereti to Prince Abulaskhar Amirejibi, who renovated the church and restored it to Christian use as the monastery of the Savior. By 1627, Katskhi appears in possession of the princely family of Abashidze, a member of which attained to the crown of Imereti as George V of Imereti from 1702 to 1707 and was buried at the Katskhi monastery after his death in exile in Tbilisi. The monastery was closed down by the Soviet authorities in 1924 and became functional again in 1990.

The Katskhi monastery was also a vibrant center of Christian culture. Surviving medieval icons and manuscripts formerly held at Katskhi are preserved in the museums of Tbilisi.

== See also ==
- Katskhi Pillar
