= List of Georgian dukes (eristavs) =

== Royal Duchies ==
=== Dukes of Klarjeti ===
The Klarjeti (Georgian: კლარჯეთი [kʼlard͡ʒɛtʰi]; Armenian: Կղարջք, Kharjk) was a province of ancient and medieval Georgia, which is now part of Turkey's Artvin Province. Klarjeti, the neighboring province of Tao and several other smaller districts constituted a larger region with shared history and culture conventionally known as Tao-Klarjeti.

Guaramid dynasty

- Guaram I (588–c. 590)
- Stephanus I (c. 590–627)
- Guaram II (684–c. 693)
- Guaram III (c. 693–c. 748)
- Stephanus III (779/780–786)

=== Dukes of Odzrkhe ===
Odzrkhe or Odzrakhe (Georgian: ოძრხე or ოძრახე) was a historic fortified town and the surrounding area in what is now Abastumani, Samtskhe-Javakheti region, southern Georgia. According to medieval Georgian historic tradition, it was founded by the mythic hero Odzrakhos of the Kartlosid line. The ruins of old fortifications are still visible around the site.

Guaramid dynasty

- Guaram I (588–c. 590)
- Stephanus I (c. 590–627)
- Guaram II (684–c. 693)
- Guaram III (c. 693–c. 748)
- Stephanus III (779/780–786)

=== Dukes of Aragvi ===
The Duchy of Aragvi was an important fiefdom in medieval and early modern Georgia, strategically located in the upper Aragvi valley, in the foothills of the eastern Greater Caucasus crest, and ruled by a succession of Eristavi ("Dukes") from c. 1380 until being transferred to the royal crown in 1747.

Shaburidze dynasty

- c.1380 : Mikheil
- c.1430 : Shanshe I
- c.1440 : Nugzari I
- c.1465–1474 : Vameki I

Sidamoni dynasty

- 1578–1580 : Iasoni I
- 1580–1600 : Avtandili I
- 1600–1618 : Nugzari
- 1618–1620 : Baaduri I
- 1620–1629 : Zurabi I,
- 1630–1635 : David I,
- 1635–1659 : Zaal I,
- 1659–1670 : Otari I
- 1670–1687 : Revazi I
- 1687–1688 : Iasoni II
- 1688–1696 : George I
- 1696–1696 : Baaduri II
- 1696–1723 : George I
- 1723–1725 : Otari II
- 1725–1729 : Teimurazi I
- 1729–1729 : Revazi II
- 1729–1731 : Papuna I
- 1731–1739 : Bardzimi I
- 1739–1743 : Bezhani

Non-Dynastic

- 1743–1747 : Givi II, Prince Amilakhvari
- 1747 : Annexation by the Kingdom of Kakheti

Bagrationi Appanage

- 1747–1756 : Vakhtang I Bagrationi
- 1756–1766 : Vacant
- 1766–1781 : Levan
- 1782–1801 : Vakhtang II
- 1801 : annexation by Russia

=== Dukes of Racha ===
The Duchy of Racha was an important fiefdom in medieval and early modern Georgia, located in the western province of Racha, in the upper Rioni valley in the foothills of the Greater Caucasus crest, and ruled by a succession of Eristavi ("Dukes") from c. 1050 until being transferred to the royal crown in 1789.

Inasaridze dynasty

- 1108–1783
- 1812–1783 Giorgi Duke of Dukes

Kakhaberidze dynasty

- Kakhaber I (died 1088)
- Niania (1088–1120)
- Kakhaber II (1175–1210)
- Kakhaber III (1245–1278)

Chkheidze dynasty

- Ivane (1488–1497)
- Kakhaber IV (1497–1510)
- Shoshita I (1534–1570)
- Papuna I (1651–1661)
- Shoshita II (1661–1684)
- Papuna II (1684–1696)
- Shoshita III (1696–1732)
- Grigol (1732–1743)
- Vakhtang (1743–1750)
- Rostom (1750–1769)
- Anton (1784, 1787–89)
- Giorgi (1784–1787)

=== Dukes of Kldekari ===
Duchy of Kldekari was an important fiefdom in the mediaeval Georgia. Ruled by a powerful dynasty of Bagvashi, the duchy existed from 876 to 1103 in the southern Kvemo Kartli province.

Bagvashi dynasty

- Liparit I (876)
- Liparit II (940-960)
- Rati I (960-988)
- Liparit III (988-1005)
- Rati II (1005–1021)
- Liparit IV (1021–1059)
- John (Ioane) (1059–1074)
- Liparit V (1074–1095)
- Rati III (1095–1102)

=== Dukes of Ksani ===
Duchy of Ksani was an administrative unit in feudal Georgia.

Kvenipneveli dynasty

- Largvel Kvenipneveli
- Shalva I Kvenipneveli, son of Duke Largvel
- Virshel Kvenipneveli, son of Duke Shalva I
- Shalva II Kvenipneveli, Duke 1460–1470
- Elizbar Kvenipneveli
- Iese I Kvenipneveli, Duke 1624–1635
- Iese II Kvenipneveli, Duke 1635–1642
- Shanshe I Kvenipneveli, Duke 1642–1653
- Shalva Kvenipneveli, Duke 1653–1661
- Iese III Kvenipneveli, Duke 1661–1675
- Datuna Kvenipneveli, Duke 1675–1717
- Shanshe Kvenipneveli, 1717–1753
- Iulon Bagrationi, born 1760, son of Georgian King Erekle II, Duke 1790–1801, died 1816
