= Byzantine–Georgian treaty of 1022 =

1022 treaty between Georgia and the Byzantine Empire

Treaty of 1022
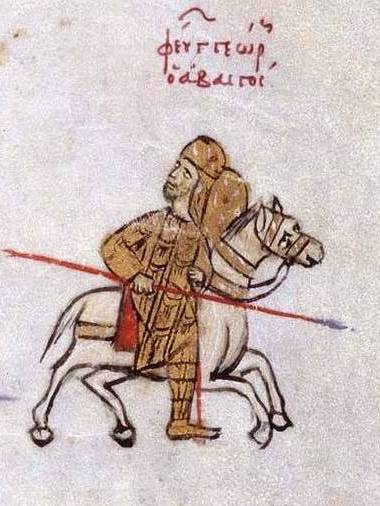
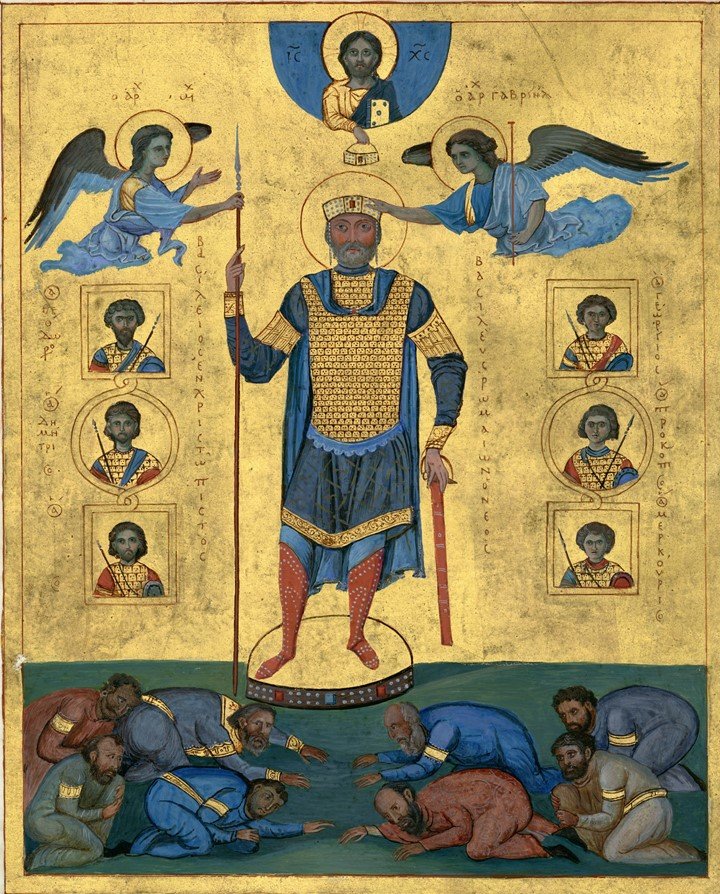
The treaty was concluded between the rulers of Kingdom of Georgia, King George I (left) and the Byzantine Empire, Emperor Basil II (right).

The Byzantine–Georgian treaty of 1022 was an agreement between the Kingdom of Georgia and the Byzantine Empire. It was signed by Georgian King George I and the Byzantine Emperor Basil II.

The major political and military event during George I's reign, a war against the Byzantine Empire, had its roots back in the 990s, when the Georgian prince David III of Tao, following his abortive rebellion against Emperor Basil II, had to agree to cede his extensive possessions in Tao to the emperor on his death. All the efforts by David's stepson and George's father, Bagrat III, to prevent these territories from being annexed to the empire went in vain. Young and ambitious, George launched a campaign to restore the David III’ succession to Georgia and occupied Tao in 1014–1016. Basil II led his army against Georgia in 1021. An exhausting war lasted for two years, and ended in a decisive Byzantine victory, forcing George to agree to a peace treaty, with the following terms:

- Georgia had to surrender several southwestern possessions (Tao, Phasiane, Kola, Artaan and Javakheti) to the Byzantine Empire;
- George I had to give his three-year-old son, Bagrat IV, as a hostage to Constantinople.
