= Apridon =

Apridon or Afridon (Georgian: აფრიდონი) was the 12th-century Georgian politician, a dependent "aznauri", who had been raised to the rank of msakhurtukhutsesi ("Master of Servants").

In sharp contrast to old, frequently rebellious Georgian feudal lords, Apridon represented ennobled statesmen at Georgian royal court, who gained distinction through their loyalty to the King George III (c. 1156-1184) whom Apridon served upon Queen Tamar’s ascent to the throne in 1184.

== History ==
In 1177, George III, was confronted by a rebellious faction of nobles. The rebels intended to dethrone George in favor of the king's fraternal nephew, Demna, it was little but a pretext for the nobles, led by the pretender's father-in-law, the amirspasalar Ivane Orbeli, the viceroy of Ani and the head of the powerful and ambitious Orbeli clan, to weaken the crown. The insurgents crowned Demna the king at the Agara Castle and marched, with 30,000 men, to the Georgian capital of Tbilisi. George was saved by the royal guard commanded by Kipchak Qubasar and Apridon, the latter was elevated to the office of Msakhurtukhutsesi. He was given possessions over Tmogvi and Trialeti to secure frontier borders in Javakheti.

Following the death of George III, Queen Tamar faced considerable opposition to her succession; this was sparked by a reaction against the repressive policies of her father and encouraged by the new sovereign's other perceived weakness, her sex. The aristocratic feudal lords directed their hatred mainly at the amirspasalar Kubasar, who had rendered King George III invaluable service during the rising, and Apridon, a dependent "aznauri", who had been raised to the rank of msakhurtukhutsesi. The nobles demanded their removal and the deprivation of all their estates and honours. The queen had to agree to concession. Apridon was stripped of all his honours and estates.

== See also ==
- Kipchaks in Georgia

== Sources ==
- Eastmond, Antony (1998). Royal Imagery in Medieval Georgia. University Park, PA: Pennsylvania State Press. ISBN 0-271-01628-0.
- Khazanov, Anatoly M.; Wink, André, eds. (2001). Nomads in the Sedentary World. London and New York: Routledge. ISBN 0-7007-1369-7.
