= Battle of Shirimni =

Battle in Turkey in 1021

- Part of the Byzantine–Georgian wars
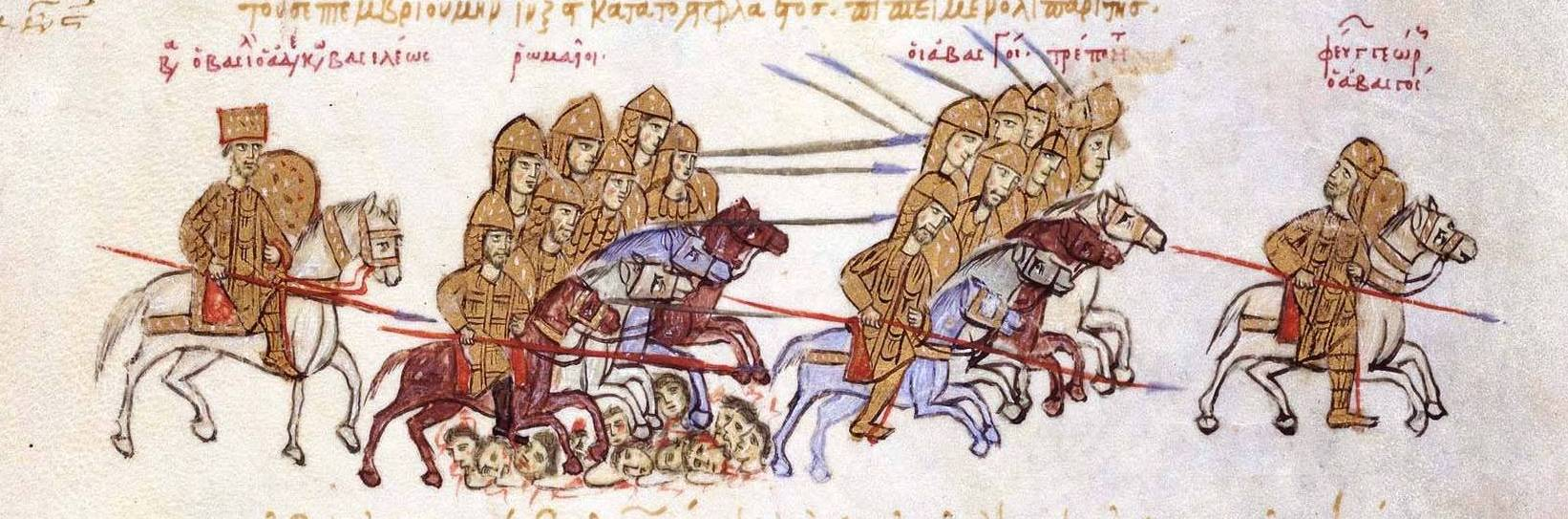
- The Skylitzes Chronicle. George I is shown as fleeing on horseback on the right and Basil II holding a shield and lance on the left.
Date	September 11, 1021
Location	Shirimni, at the Lake Palakazio, now Childir, Turkey 41°01′N 43°14′E
Result	Byzantine victory

Belligerents
Byzantine Empire	Kingdom of Georgia; Kingdom of Armenia

Commanders and leaders
Basil II	George I Rati Baghuashi †; Khursi †

Strength
Unknown, probably large	Unknown, probably fewer
- Location within Georgia Battle of Shirimni (Turkey) Battle of Shirimni (Caucasus Mountains)

Battle of Shirimni (Georgian: შირიმნის ბრძოლა) also known as the Battle of Palakazio was fought between the Byzantine and Georgian armies at the place of Shirimni at the Palakazio Lake (now Childir, Turkey; then part of Georgia) on September 11, 1021.

== Background ==
King George I, still young and proud of his few exploits, decided to rekindle the old tensions between his nation and the Byzantine Empire, which had experienced imperialist surges in this region of the Caucasus since at least the reign of Justinian I (527-565). Moreover, he truly considered himself the successor of the one who tried to unify the Georgian lands, and the loss of the Kingdom of Kakheti-Hereti led him to seek new domains in the southwest. This is how he thinks of the Tao, ancient Kingdom of the Georgians and hereditary domain of the first Bagrations, which had been bequeathed by will to Emperor Basil II by David III Kurapalates as the term of a punishment due to the support of the latter for the rebel Bardas Phokas, and part of which was offered by Byzantine Empire to Bagrat III.

Since the year 1000, Basil II has been in total war against the Bulgarians, and therefore has little time to take care of Georgia. For this reason, George I invaded the contested heritage for the first time in 1014/1016, without receiving a direct military response from the emperor. However, Aristakes Lastivertsi reports an epistolary exchange between Basil and the Georgian king. In it, it says:

— Abandon the portion of the inheritance of the curopalate that I had given to your father, and be content to reign in your patrimony.
— Of what the prince my father possessed, I will not give a single house to anyone.

== Battle ==
Following this refusal, Basil II intervened directly, despite his difficulties in Bulgaria, but the renewal of the alliance between Georgia and the main enemy of Byzantine Empire, the Fatimid Caliphate (against whom the Byzantine emperor had led a war between 992 and 995), repels the Greek troops for the first time. However, in 1018, Bulgaria was completely subject to Byzantine Empire. The Bulgarian Tsar Prousjanos II was dethroned and Bulgaria was made a province of the Byzantine Empire. A little later, the Caliph Al-Hakim bi-Amr Allah died and his son Al-Zahir li-I'zaz Din Allah, too inexperienced to think about Georgia, succeeded him. George I found himself alone again in the international framework and the Basileus sent all his troops against him. The two armies then meet on the plains of Basiani, in Tao, but George I retreats, burns the town of Oltisi to divert the path of the Greeks, before being caught at Cola. Not far from there, at the village of Shirimni, the Georgian rearguard was attacked by the Byzantine vanguard, following which a fierce battle ensued on September 11, 1021, a battle won with difficulty by Basil's troops II, who is also present himself at the heart of the battlefield, after the death of the greatest Georgian generals of the time. The Georgian troops quickly left the region to take refuge in Samtskhe, but the Byzantines still pursued them and ravaged Javakheti, before burning the town of Artaani.

== See also ==
- Byzantine–Georgian wars
- Battle of Svindax

== Bibliography ==
- Grousset, René (1949). L'Empire du Levant : Histoire de la Question d'Orient. Bibliothèque historique (in French). Paris: Payot. p. 153. ISBN 2-228-12530-X.
- Rayfield, Donald (2013). Edge of Empires: A History of Georgia. Reaktion Books. ISBN 978-1780230702.
- Javakhishvili, Ivane (1949). Histoire de la Géorgie. XIe – XVe siècles (in Georgian). Tbilisi: Publication d'État de la RSS de Géorgie..
- Salia, Kalistrat (1980). Histoire de la nation géorgienne [History of the Georgian nation] (in French). Paris: Nino Salia.
