= Duchy of Kldekari =

Duchy of Kldekari კლდეკარის საერისთავო
- Duchy of the Kingdom of Georgia
- 876–1184
- Duchy of Kldekari in 10th century
- Capital: Kldekari
- Historical era: Middle Ages
  - Established: 876
  - Disestablished: 1184
Preceded by
Principality of Tao-Klarjeti
- Today part of: Georgia

The Duchy of Kldekari (Georgian: კლდეკარის საერისთავო, romanized: k'ldek'aris saeristavo), sometimes also referred to as County of Trialeti was a duchy (saeristavo) within the kingdom of Georgia from 876-1184. Ruled by a powerful dynasty of Liparitids-Baghuashi, the duchy existed in the south-western parts of modern Kvemo Kartli province, and despite its small size, created problems for the Bagrationi kings as they sought to bring all Georgian vassals and principalities into a unified state.

== History ==
The duchy was established in 876 by Liparit I of the Baghuashi, who had been expelled by the Abkhazian kings from his fiefdom of Argveti (in upper Imereti). In their new fiefdom, the Liparitids accepted the suzerainty of David I of Iberia, a Georgian Bagratid prince of Iberia based in Tao-Klarjeti, and built a stronghold called Kldekari (Georgian: კლდე კარი; lit. the "rock gate", as this was a common naming scheme of border strongholds (see "Alan's gate") on a strategic mountain of the Trialeti Range to control the roads cut through the cliff connecting the regions of Eastern Georgia with the southern neighboring countries and the Byzantine Empire. This area lay in the possessions of David’s kinsman Guaram of Javakheti, and the move eventually led to a split among the Bagratids which concluded with the murder of David by his nephew (son of Guaram Mampali) Nasra in 881. In a civil war that ensued, Liparit supported David’s heir, Adarnase IV of Iberia, who was victorious and crowned, with the Armenian support, as King of the Iberians in 888. Thus, Liparit and his heirs secured a hereditary dukedom of Trialeti and Kldekari. They quickly rose in prominence, gaining more possessions and prestige and when, in the early 11th century, the Bagratid dynasty established the unified all-Georgian monarchy, the Liparitids were among its most powerful vassals and rivals.

=== Rise and fall ===
In the mid-eleventh century, the Liparitid house reached the apogee of their might and remained, for a century, leaders of the feudality in its struggle against the growing power of the kings of Georgia. In 1047, one of the most illustrious representatives of the family, Liparit IV became a regent for the young Georgian king Bagrat IV in the early 1030s, and even succeeded in temporarily driving King Bagrat IV into the Byzantine territory. The kings of Georgia had to concede more possessions and titles to the family in order to pacify a series of the Liparitid rebellions. Subsequently, relations between the two men deteriorated and flared into an armed conflict. With the military support from the Byzantine Empire, Liparit defeated Bagrat at the Battle of Sasireti in 1042, and became a virtual ruler of Georgia, but eventually was forced out by his own subjects in 1059. His son and heir, John, was allowed by the Georgian crown to succeed Liparit IV as a duke. In 1074, John revolted against King George II of Georgia and attempted to get Seljuk support. However, a Seljuk invasion force temporarily occupied the duchy and captured the ducal family.

David IV, a new and perhaps the most successful king of Georgia, forced the Liparitid-Baghuashi into submission in 1093 and checked their subsequent attempts to revolt. In 1103, David took advantage of the death of the last Kldekarian duke Rati III and abolished the duchy by incorporating the area directly into the royal domain.

== Rulers ==
Dukes	Reign	Titles
Liparit I	876–?	
Liparit II	940–960	
Rati I	960–988	
Liparit III	988–1005	
Rati II	1005–1021	
Liparit IV	1021–1059	magistros (and possibly also curopalates).
John	1059–1080	
Liparit V	1080–1095	
Tevdore	1094/5	mosakargave (a salaried governor)
Rati III	1095–1102	
Vakhtang	until 1178	
Apridon	1178–1184	Msakhurtukhutsesi

== See also ==
- Duchy of Aragvi
- Duchy of Racha
- Duchy of Ksani
