= Ivane I of Kldekari =

John I Baghuashi
- Duke of Kldekari
- Reign: 1059 – 1080/89
- Predecessor: Liparit IV of Kldekari
- Successor: Liparit V of Kldekari
- Noble family: Liparitids

John I (Georgian: ივანე) (died c. 1080/89) was an 11th-century Georgian general and duke (eristavi) of Kldekari, Argveti, and Orbeti-Samshvilde of the House of Liparitid-Baguashi from 1059 to 1080/89.

Ivane was the son of Liparit IV, Duke of Kldekari, who posed a serious challenge to the power of the Bagratid kings of Georgia. Ivane participated in his father’s struggle against King Bagrat IV whose eventual victory in the 1050s forced Liparit and his family into exile in the Byzantine Empire. Ivane's brother, Niania, had already departed for Ani where he died in the Byzantine service. Ivane likewise offered his service to the imperial administration, being appointed by the emperor Isaac I governor of the city of Erez in the province of Archamouni, near Theodosiopolis (modern Erzurum, Turkey). Ivane capitalized on the withering Byzantine control of eastern Anatolia in the wake of Seljuk attacks and civil tumults to enlarge his fiefdom and occupied two fortresses, Olnout and Khabtzitzin, arresting the imperial official and expropriating much of the imperial treasury in the latter town. He then marched to Theodosiopolis and, once refused entry, laid siege to the city. He had to withdraw when the Byzantine governor of Ani sent an army to its relief, but stuck a deal with the Seljuks and led a marauding raid into the theme of Chaldia.

A short time later, Liparit, still in exile at Constantinople and loyal to the empire, persuaded the Georgian king Bagrat IV to grant an amnesty to Ivane. Around 1059 Ivane was able to return to Georgia where he was restored in parts of his father’s possessions. Ivane then served loyally to Bagrat and his successor George II. He served as Bagrat's envoy to the Seljuk sultan Alp Arslan and was instrumental in defeating al-Fadhl ibn Muhammad, the Shaddadid emir of Arran, at Tiflis in 1069. By 1073, however, Ivane had changed sides and challenged the authority of George II. The king had to buy peace by granting the city of Samshvilde to Ivane and the fortress of Lotsobani on the Ksani to Ivane's son Liparit. Yet Ivane moved on to capture from the royal garrison the stronghold of Gagi which he then sold to his erstwhile foe al-Fadhl. In 1074, when the Seljuks again crossed into Georgia, Ivane arrived to meet and pay homage to the sultan Malik Shah I whom he, subsequently, deserted. The Seljuks struck deeper in Georgia in 1080, capturing Ivane with his family at Samshvilde. From there on, Ivane disappears from historical records.
