= Prince Demetrius of Georgia =

Georgian prince

Demetrius
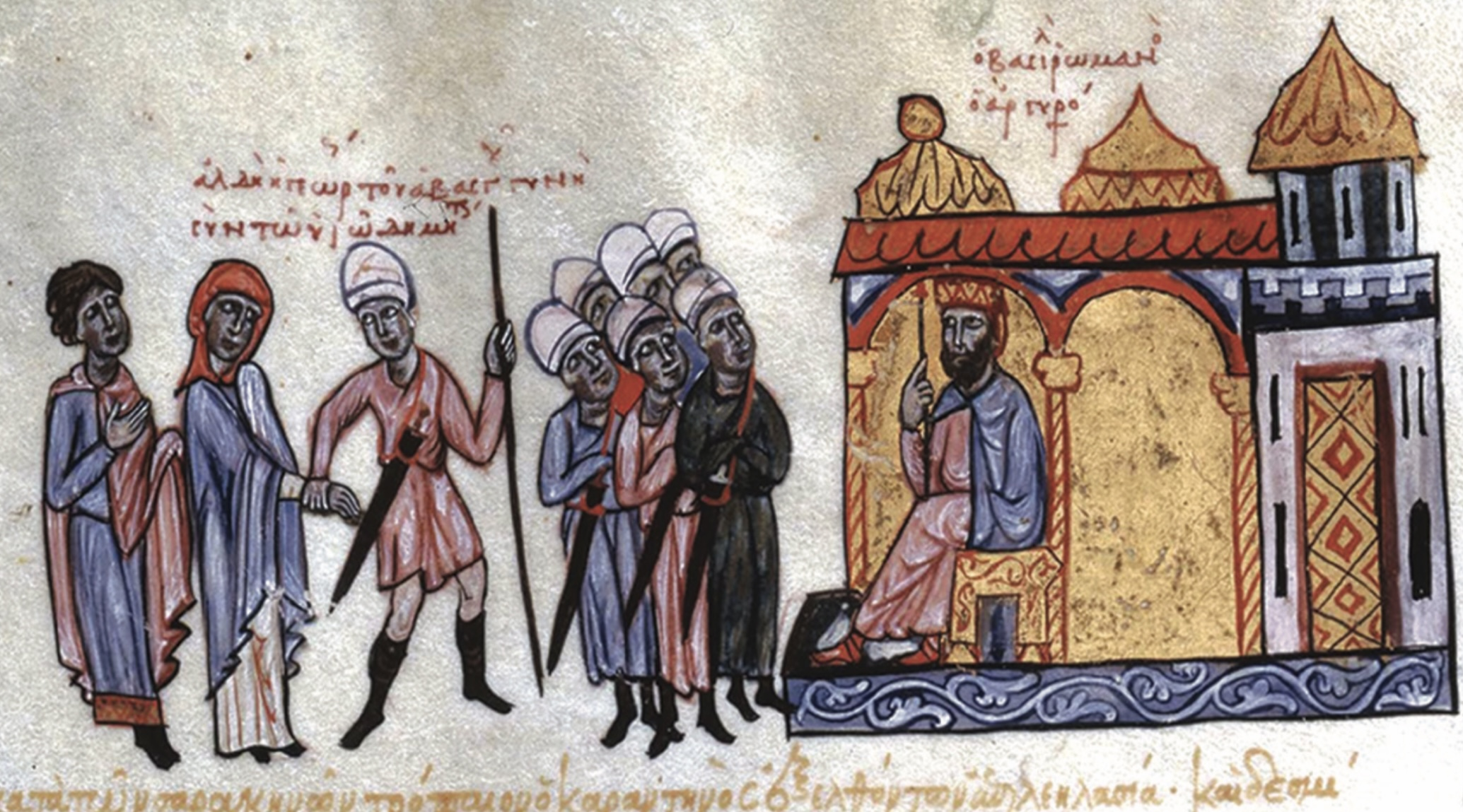
- Demetrius and his mother, Alda shown at far left, meeting Byzantine emperor. Skylitzes Chronicle.
- Born: Unknown
- Died: 1042
- Issue: David; Irene of Alania
- Dynasty: Bagrationi
- Father: George I of Georgia
- Mother: Alda of Alania
- Religion: Georgian Orthodox Church

Demetrius (Georgian: დემეტრე, Demetre) (died 1042) was a Georgian prince of the Bagrationi royal dynasty, and a claimant to the throne of Georgia. He was the younger son of George I of Georgia by his second wife Alda, daughter of the king of Alania.

== Biography ==
After the death of George I, some Georgian nobles wished to enthrone Demetrius instead of his half-brother Bagrat IV (r. 1027–1072), but to no avail. Alda and Demetrius lived in their fief at Anakopia, a fortified maritime town in Abkhazia, which had been bequeathed to them by the late king George I. The efforts by Bagrat's mother Mariam to win Demetrius's loyalty to the crown went in vain. Threatened by Bagrat, Alda defected to the Byzantines and surrendered Anakopia to the emperor Romanos III who honored her son Demetrius with the rank of magistros. This happened in 1033.

In 1039, Demetrius returned to Georgia with Byzantine troops. Liparit IV, of the Liparitid clan, the most powerful noble in Georgia, supported the rebellious prince and launched initially a successful campaign against Bagrat's army. However, Demetrius died unexpectedly in 1042. Alda, with Demetrius’s son David, fled to her native Alania. The 18th-century Georgian scholar Prince Vakhushti argues that David’s descendants flourished in Alania and produced a line of local princes of which came David Soslan, the second husband of Queen Tamar of Georgia (r. 1184–1213). According to Cyril Toumanoff, Demetrius also had a daughter, Irene, the mistress of the Byzantine emperor Constantine IX Monomachus and then the wife of sebastokrator Isaac Komnenos.

Anakopia, ceded by Alda and Demetrius to the emperor, would remain under the Byzantine sway until being recovered by Bagrat’s son and successor George II in 1074. This happened after the Battle of Manzikert (1071). Profiting by the defeat of the Byzantines at the hands of the Seljukids, Georgia regained a number of key territories lost to the Empire in the course of the 11th century, including Anakopia as well as the fortresses located in the Thema of Iberia.
