= Battle of Sasireti =

Battle in Georgia in 1042

- Part of Georgian civil war
Date	1042
Location	Sasireti, Kingdom of Georgia
Result	Rebel victory

Belligerents
Kingdom of Georgia; Varangians	Duchy of Kldekari; Byzantine auxiliaries

Commanders and leaders
Bagrat IV; Ingvar	Liparit IV

Strength
Unknown number of Georgian warriors, 2,000 Vikings	Unknown

Casualties and losses
Unknown, many Vikings killed, many more captured, including Ingvar	Unknown

The Battle of Sasireti (Georgian: სასირეთის ბრძოლა) took place in 1042 at the village of Sasireti in the present day Shida Kartli region, not far from the town of Kaspi, during the civil war in the Kingdom of Georgia. It resulted in a decisive defeat of the army of King Bagrat IV by the rebel feudal lord Liparit IV of Kldekari.

== Background ==
A feud between Bagrat IV and his former general, Liparit Baghvashi, a powerful duke of Kldekari, erupted during their campaign against the Georgian city of Tbilisi (1037–1040), which at the time was ruled by Arab emirs. The king, advised by Liparit's opponents, made peace with Emir Ali ibn-Jafar, a sworn enemy of the duke, in 1040. In retaliation, Liparit revolted and endeavoured to put Demetrius, Bagrat's half-brother, on the Georgian throne. However, he had no success and ended hostilities with Bagrat, receiving the title of Grand Duke of Kartli, but giving up his son, Ioane, as a hostage of the king. Soon Liparit rose again in rebellion, requesting Byzantine aid. Supported by a Byzantine force and an army of Kakheti (a kingdom in eastern Georgia), he released his son and again invited the pretender prince Demetrius to be crowned king. Demetrius later died at the very beginning of the war, but Liparit continued to fight the king's forces.

== Battle ==
The royal army commanded by King Bagrat was joined by a Varangian detachment of 1000 men, probably a subdivision of the 3000 men strong expedition of the Swedish Viking Ingvar the Far-Travelled. According to an old Georgian chronicle, they had landed at Bashi, a place by the mouth of the Rioni river, in Western Georgia.

The two armies fought a decisive battle near the village of Sasireti, eastern Georgia, in the spring of 1042. Ingvar and the Varangians charged the rebel force before King Bagrat could consolidate his army, forcing him to join the assault without any strategy. In fierce fighting, the royal army was defeated and retreated westwards. Ingvar and many of his men were captured but later released by Liparit. Every captured royalist on the other hand were tortured and maimed. However many of the vikings including Ingvar did not survive marching beyond Kutaisi as they succumbed to disease. The rebel leader proceeded to seize the key fortress of Ardanuç, thereby becoming the virtual ruler of the southern and eastern provinces of Georgia. Defeated in the battle, it was not until 1059 that Bagrat IV was able to restore his authority in the kingdom, forcing the renegade Duke Liparit into exile in Constantinople.

== See also ==
- Duchy of Kldekari
- Byzantine–Georgian wars
