= Kldekari (mountain) =

Mountain in Georgia

Mount Kldekari
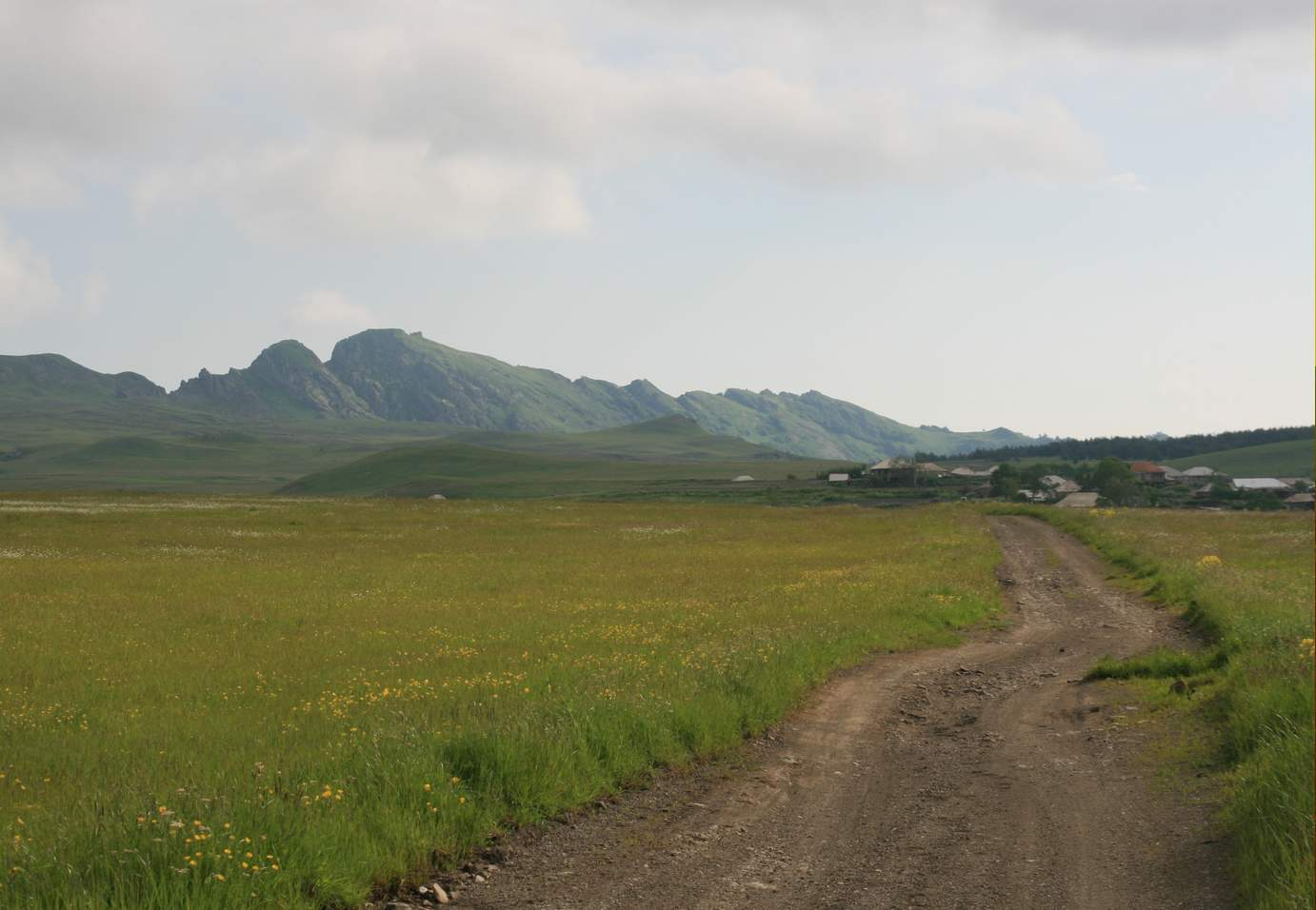
- Kldekari as seen from vill

Highest point
- Elevation: 2,000 m (6,600 ft)
- Coordinates: 41°44′35″N 44°12′39″E

Geography
- Location within Shida Kartli Location within Georgia
- Parent range: Trialeti

Geology
- Rock age: Quaternary

Kldekari (Georgian: კლდეკარი) is a mountain, with an elevation of 2,000 meters above sea level, and a rocky pass of the Trialeti range in the Shida Kartli and Kvemo Kartli region of southeastern Georgia. In the vicinity are the ruins of the medieval Kldekari Fortress.
