= Liparitids =

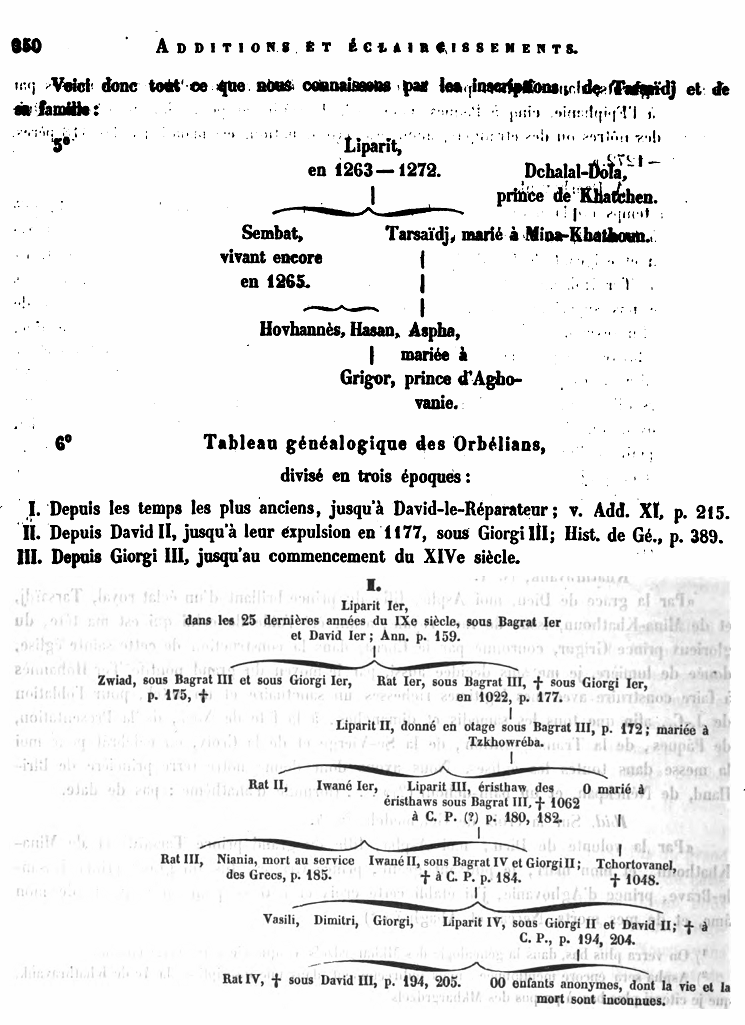
Genealogy of the family of Liparitids

The Liparitids (Georgian: ლიპარიტები), also known as Baghuashi (ბაღჳაში), were a Georgian noble house (didebuli) in medieval Georgia, with notable members from the 9th to 12th centuries. They were famed for their powerful resistance to the consolidation of Bagratid royal authority in the Kingdom of Georgia. A principal branch of the Liparitid house, known later under the name of Orbelian.

== Origins ==
The Liparitids are believed by Cyril Toumanoff and some other modern scholars to have been descended from one of the fugitive princes of the Mamikonid dynasty. According to Toumanoff, the Mamikonids themselves were of Georgian origin. This hypothesis is not commonly shared by the scholars in Georgia who believe the family to have been native to the western Georgian district of Argveti whence they were ousted by the kings of Abkhazia in the 870s. Either way, the dynasty, in the person of its eponymous founder, Liparit I, established themselves in the province of Trialeti in southern Georgia (Lower Iberia) c. 876. In Georgia, they received the moniker of "Baghuashi", probably derived from baghva, an archaic Georgian word for "ravaging" (cf. Orbeliani, Sulkhan-Saba, Dictionary, 4.4: 101. Tbilisi, 1965 [in Georgian]), which eventually firmly attached to the family.

== Early history ==
In their new fiefdom, the Liparitids accepted the suzerainty of David I Kuropalates, a Georgian Bagratid prince of Iberia based in Tao-Klarjeti, and built a stronghold called Klde-Karni on a strategic mountain of the Trialeti Range. This area lay in the possessions of David's kinsman Guaram Mampali, and the move eventually led to a split among the Bagratids which concluded with the murder of David by his nephew (son of Guaram Mampali) Nasra in 881. In a civil war that ensued, Liparit supported David's heir, Adarnase I, who was victorious and crowned, with the Armenian support, as King of the Georgians in 888. Thus, Liparit and his heirs secured a hereditary dukedom of Trialeti and Kldekari. They quickly rose in prominence, gaining more possessions and prestige and when, in the early 11th century, the Bagratid dynasty established the unified all-Georgian monarchy, the Liparitids were among its most powerful vassals and rivals.

== Struggle with the Bagrationis ==
In the mid-eleventh century, the Liparitid house reached the apogee of their might and remained, for a century, leaders of the feudality in its struggle against the growing power of the kings of Georgia. In 1047, one of the most illustrious representatives of the family, Liparit IV, even succeeded in temporarily driving King Bagrat IV into the Byzantine territory. The kings of Georgia had to concede more possessions and titles to the family in order to pacify a series of the Liparitid rebellions. In 1093, David IV of Georgia defeated Liparit IV and expelled him into the Byzantine Empire, absorbing the Liparitid duchy into royal domain. After their expulsion from Georgia, several Liparitids also were active in the Byzantine military and administrative service in the 12th century.

A cadet branch of the Liparitid house, the Kakhaberisdze, was enfeoffed of Racha and Takveri in northwestern Georgia, from the 11th or 12th century to the 13th, though they appear to have maintained themselves in it till the 15th. Another possible branch, Surameli, were eristavi of Kartli and princes of Surami down to the 14th century.
