= Madrid Skylitzes =

Illuminated manuscript of Byzantine chronicle

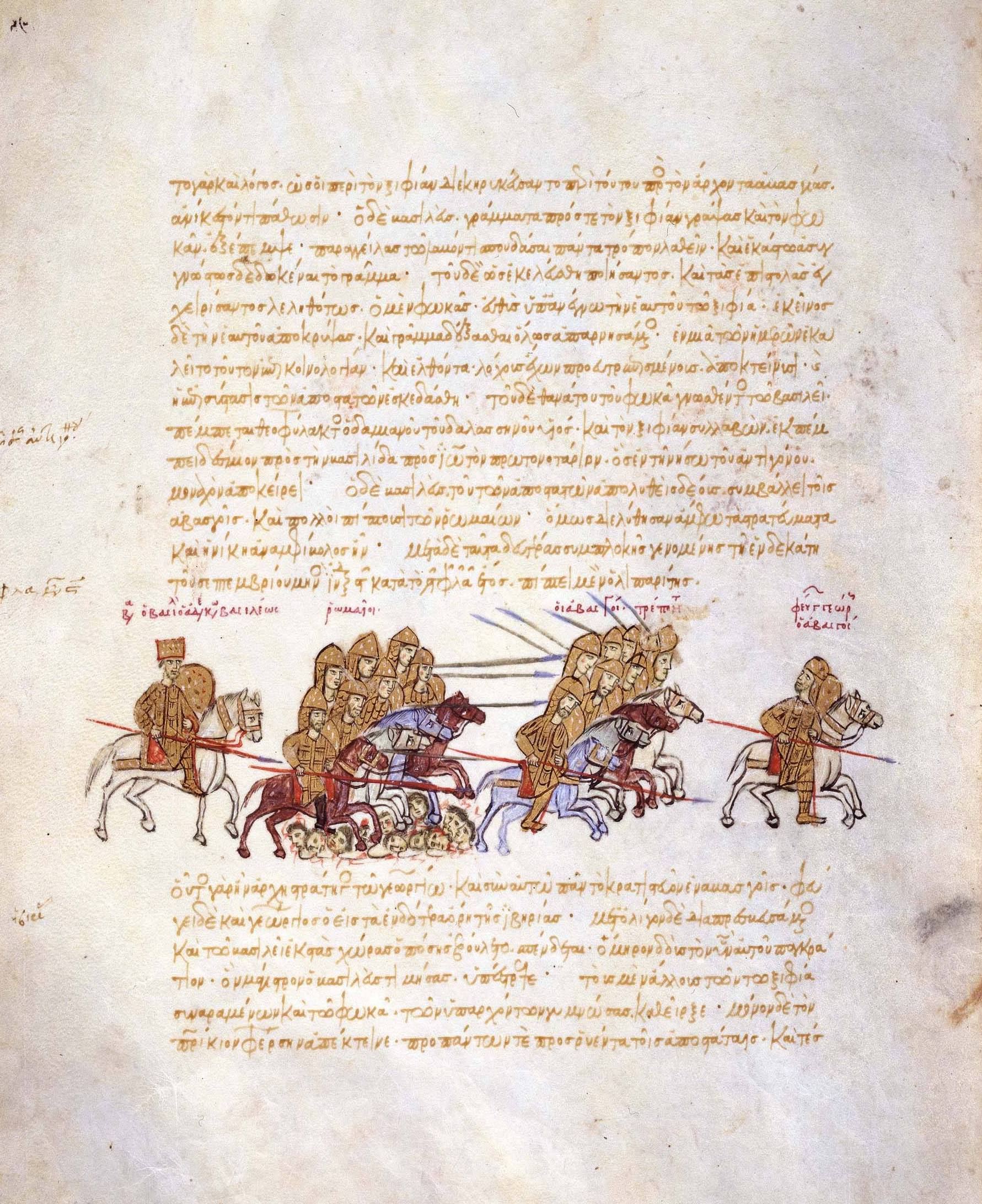
- Scene from the Battle of Shirimni; the army of Basil II defeating George I of Georgia
- Author: John Skylitzes
- Original title: Σύνοψις Ἱστοριῶν
- Language: Medieval Greek
- Genre: Historiography
- Publication date: 12th century

The Madrid Skylitzes is a 12th-century illuminated manuscript version of the Synopsis of Histories (Greek: Σύνοψις Ἱστοριῶν) (Note: Byzantine Greek: [ˈsy̜.nop.sis is.to.riˈon]) by John Skylitzes, which covers the reigns of the Byzantine emperors from the death of Nicephorus I in 811 to the deposition of Michael VI in 1057. The manuscript was produced at the Norman court of Palermo in Sicily (there is some debate on whether the main body was made in Palermo or Constantinople) and is now housed in the Biblioteca Nacional de España in Madrid. . The chronicle includes 574 miniatures detailing depictions of everyday life in the Byzantine Empire such as boats, literary practices, sieges, and ceremonies, in "both purely Byzantine and Western styles".

== Images ==
Illustrations from Madrid Skylitzes
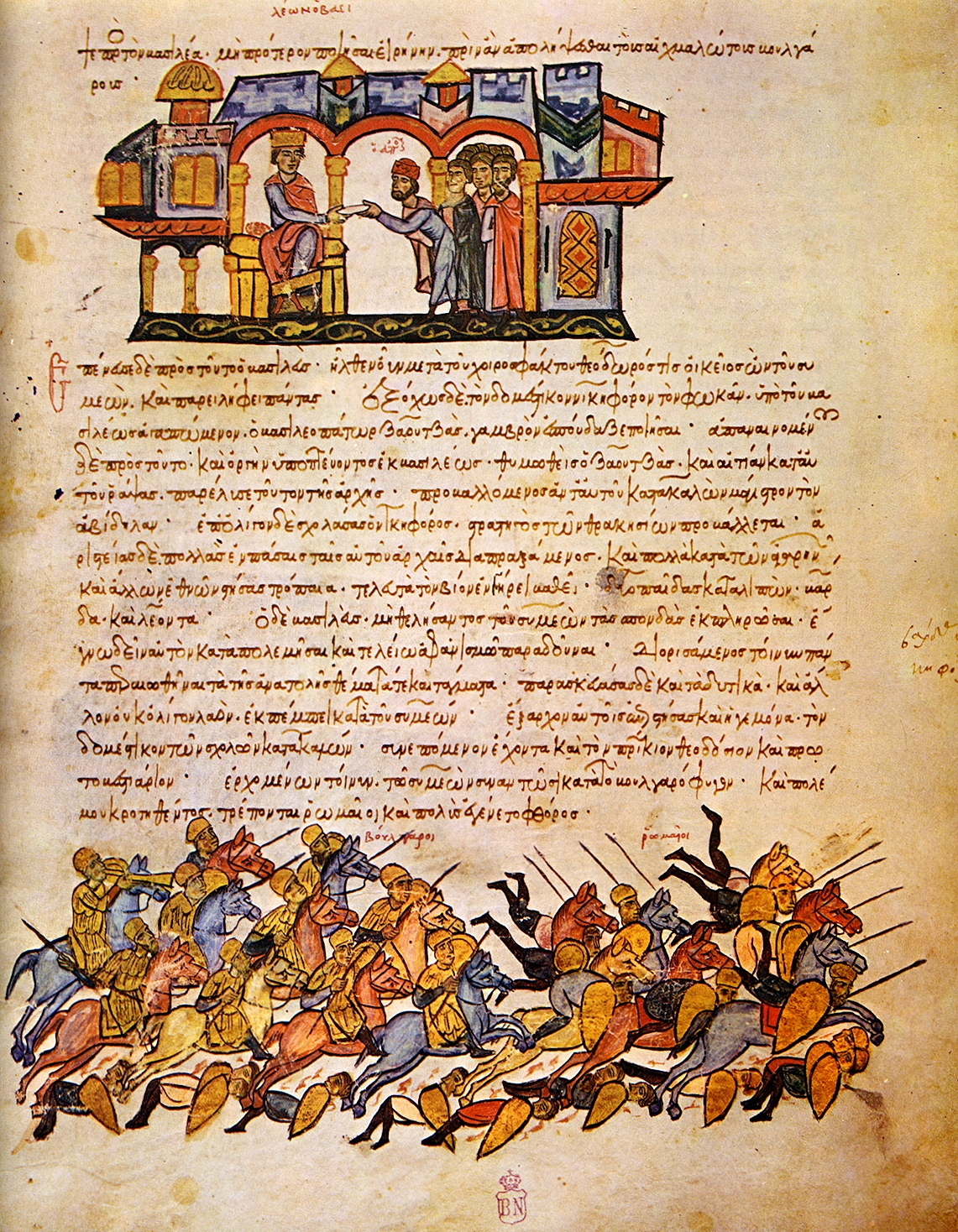
a. Leo VI with a Bulgarian delegation
b. The Battle of Boulgarophygon

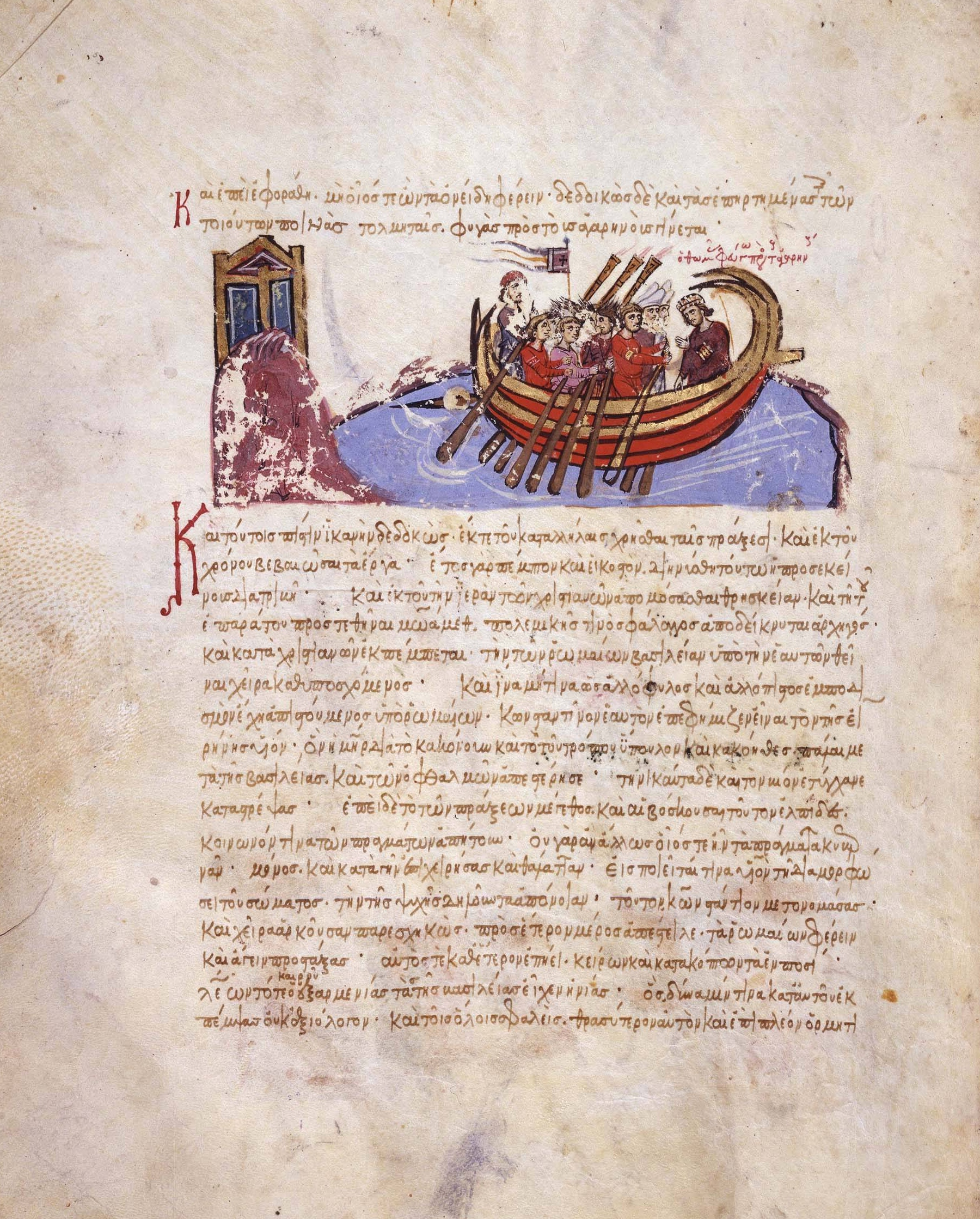
Thomas the Slav seeks refuge with the Arabs

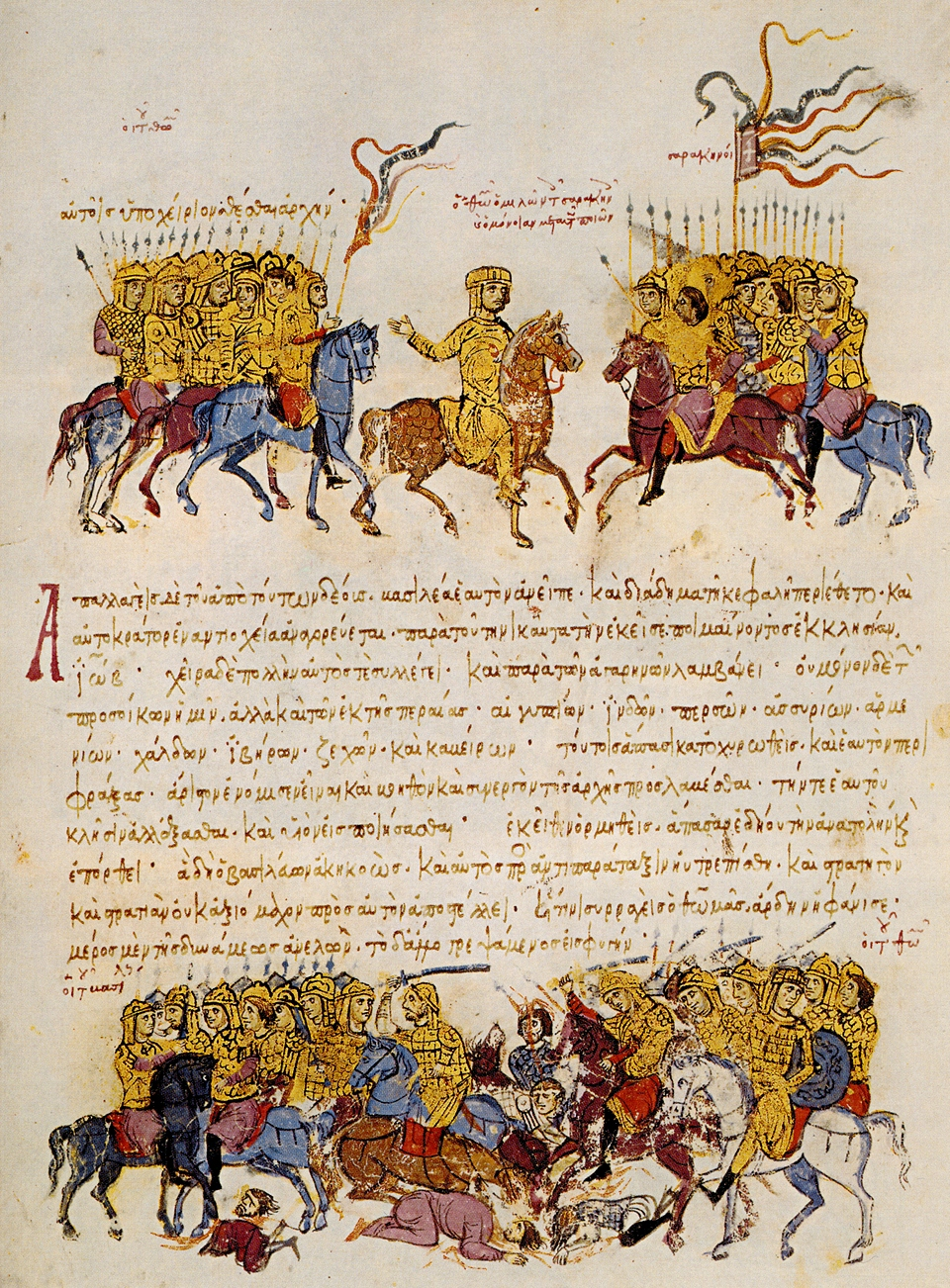
a. Thomas the Slav negotiates with the Saracens
b. Thomas's troops defeat the Imperial army

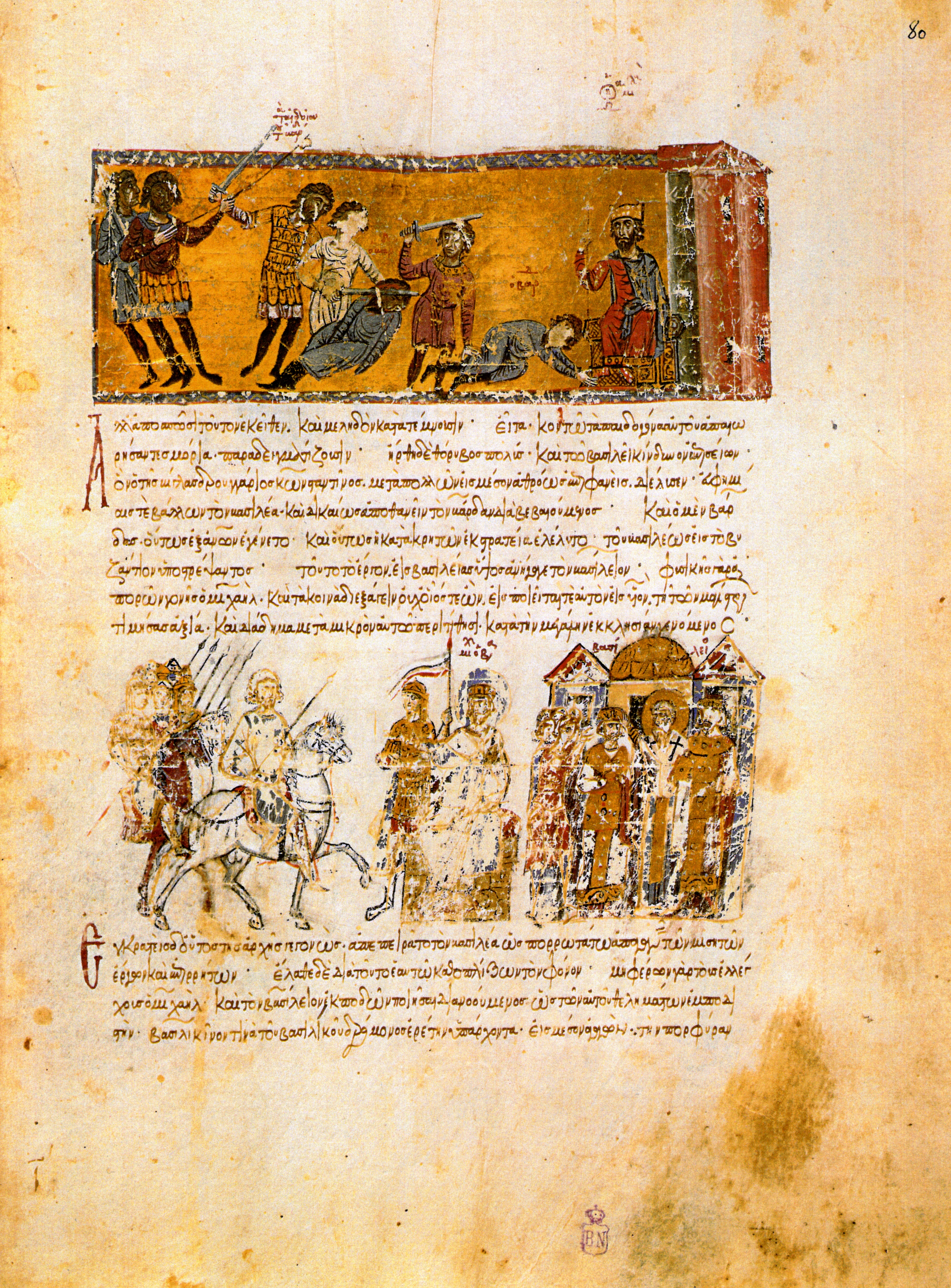
a. The assassination of Bardas at the feet of Michael III (865-866)
b. Return of the army and coronation of Basil I as co-regent

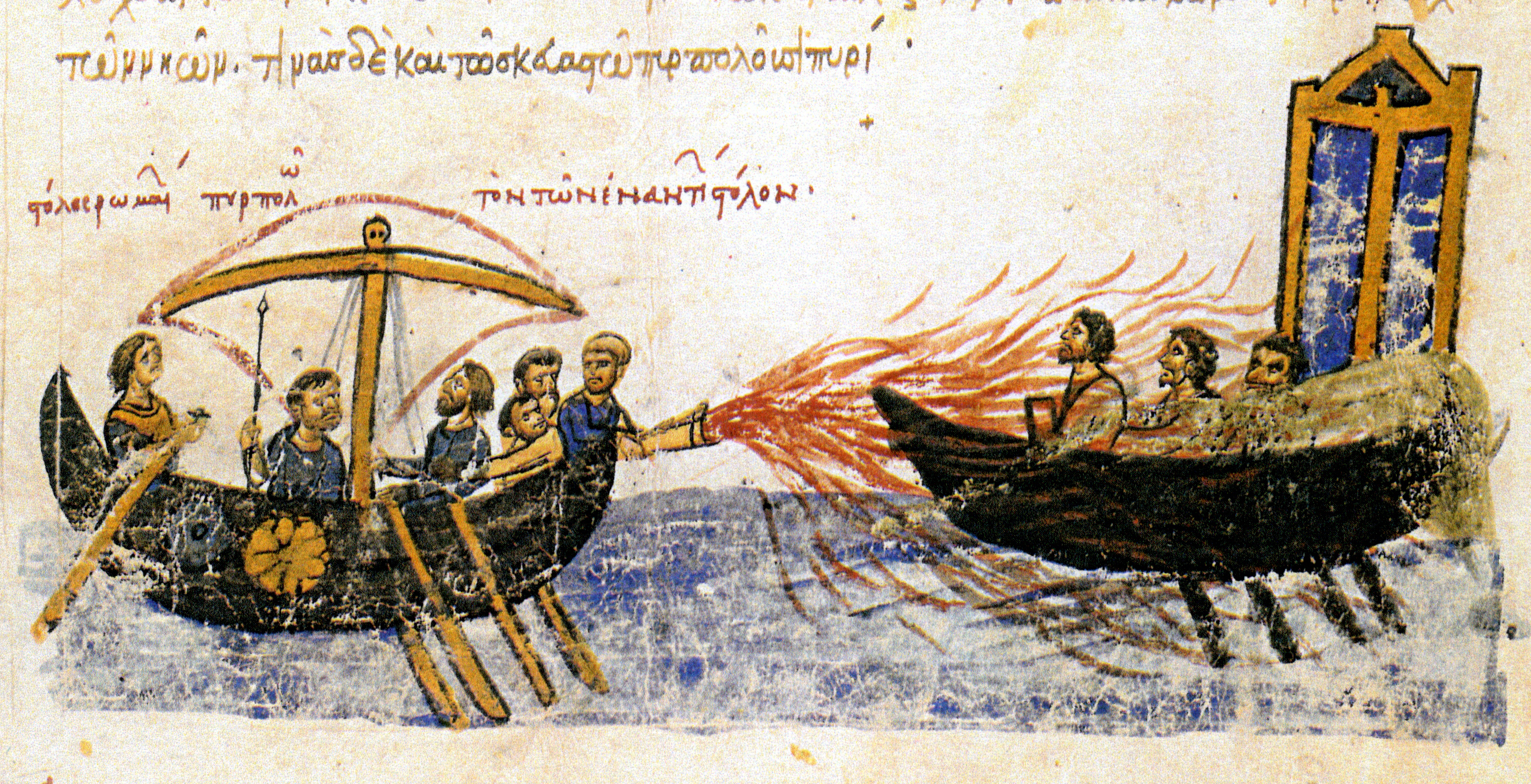
Depiction of Greek fire in the Madrid Skylitzes

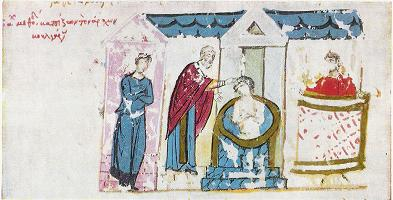
Depiction of the baptism of Boris I of Bulgaria

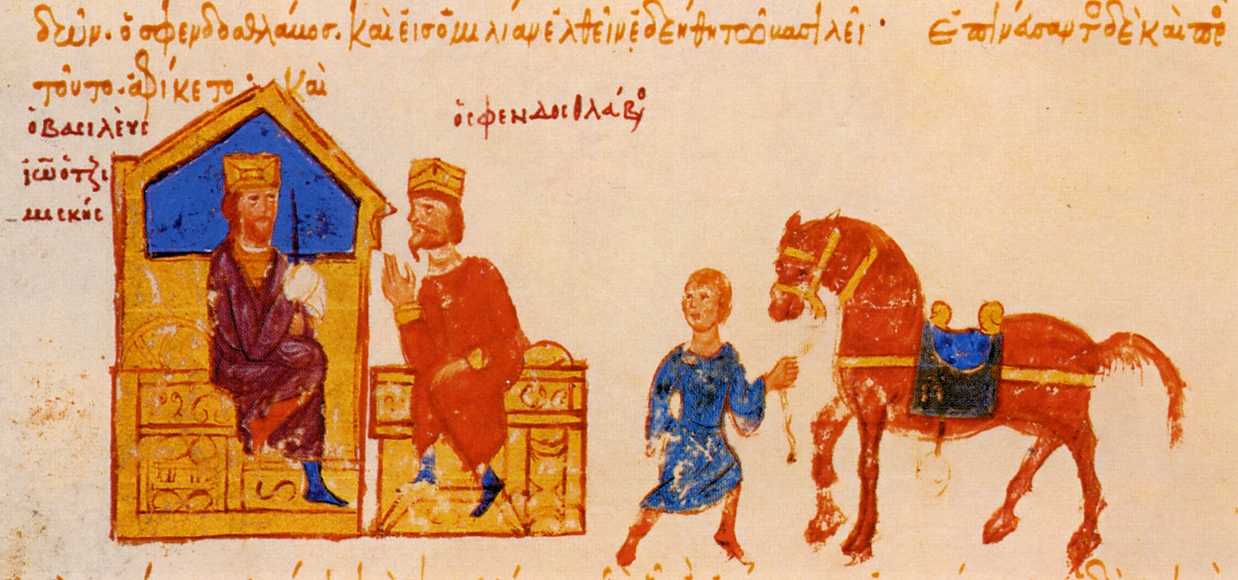
Meeting between Emperor John Tzimiskes and Sviatoslav I of Kiev

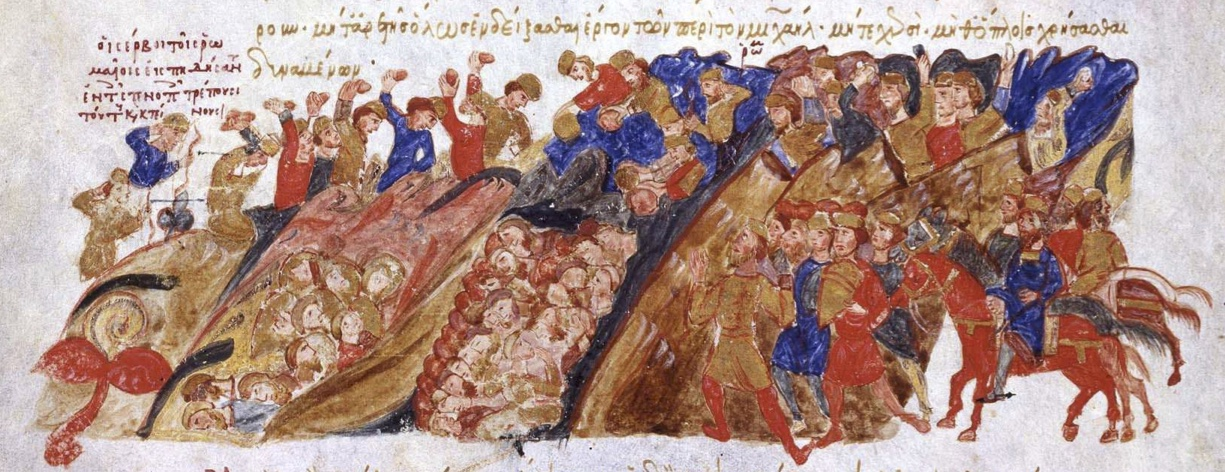
Serbs attack the Byzantines in the mountain passes at the Battle of Bar

== Bibliography ==
- Color facsimile edition by Militos (Μίλητος) Publishers, ISBN 960-8460-16-6.
- Tsamakda, Vasiliki (2002). The Illustrated Chronicle of Ioannes Skylitzes, Leiden.
- Bjørnholt, Bente and J. Burke, eds. (2005). "The Cultures and Contexts of the Madrid Skylitzes". International Medieval Congress, University of Leeds
