= Liparit IV of Kldekari =

Liparit IV Baghuashi
- Duke of Kldekari
- Reign: 1030's – 1059
- Predecessor: Liparit III of Kldekari
- Successor: Ivane I of Kldekari
- Noble family: Liparitids

Liparit IV, sometimes known as Liparit III (Georgian: ლიპარიტ IV [III]), was an 11th-century Georgian general and political figure who was at times the most valuable support of King Bagrat IV of Georgia (1027–1072) and his most dangerous rival. He was of the House of Liparitid-Baguashi (later Orbeli or Orbeliani), and thus, a hereditary duke (eristavi) of Kldekari and Trialeti.

== Rise to power ==
Liparit appeared on the political scene of Georgia in the late 1020s when he, as a holder of the fortress of Kldekari and later as a commander-in-chief of the royal armies, proved himself as the defender of the boy king Bagrat IV and his regent Dowager Queen Mariam. The Georgian Chronicles identify Liparit as "the son of Liparit", while John Skylitzes refers to him as son of ‘Оράτιης Λιπαρίτης, i.e., Rati. His successful resistance to the invading Byzantine troops in 1028 and a victorious campaign against the Shaddadid dynasty of Arran in 1034 made Liparit the most powerful noble in Georgia. In 1038 Liparit was on the verge of capturing the Georgian city of Tbilisi, which had been under the Muslim sway for centuries; but fearing his growing power the Georgian nobles thwarted the plan and persuaded the king to make peace with the emir of Tbilisi. As a result, Liparit turned into a sworn enemy of Bagrat and began actively cooperating with foreign powers for vengeance. In 1039, he pledged his support to Bagrat’s half-brother Demetrius who entered Georgia with a Byzantine army to seize the crown. After Demetrius’ death in 1042, Liparit continued the struggle against Bagrat and became a major champion of the Byzantine influence in the region. He enjoyed numerous successes against the royal armies, most notably at Sasireti, where Bagrat suffered a crushing defeat and was forced to withdraw from his eastern possessions. The battle is also known for the involvement of Varangian mercenaries, most probably on the king’s side.

Bagrat appealing to the emperor Constantine IX, it was arranged, through the Byzantine mediation, that Liparit should receive nearly a half of the realm (south of the Mtkvari River) only as a dutiful subject to the king of Georgia. Thus, in the period of 1045-1048, Liparit IV, Duke of Trialeti, Argveti, Lower and Upper Iberia, Prince-Constable of Georgia, became the most powerful person in the kingdom. Not without a good reason, the Arab chronicler Ibn al-Athir calls him "king of the Abasgians [i.e. Georgians]." Liparit, called Liparites by Byzantine writers, was at the same time a Byzantine dignitary with the prestigious rank of magistros (and possibly also curopalates).

== Downfall ==
In 1048, Liparit, as a Byzantine magistros, was summoned by Constantine IX to give aid against the Seljuk Turks, advancing into Anatolia. At the battle of Kapetrou in September 1048, Liparit was captured and sent as a prisoner to Isfahan. The emperor sent an embassy of Georgios Drosos with gifts and a ransom for his release to the Seljuk sultan Toghrul Beg. However, the sultan magnanimously set free Liparit on condition that he would never again fight the Seljuks and was handed back the ransom (Skylitzes 454.15-19). According to Ibn al-Athir, the intermediary was not Drosus, but the Kurdish emir Nasr ad-Daulah, while the Armenian chronicler Matthew of Edessa asserts that Liparit was released after the Georgian, in the sultan's presence, had defeated a formidable "Negro" champion in single combat.

In Liparit's absence, Bagrat took an upper hand and even carried off his wife; but regaining his liberty in 1049 or 1051, Liparit took up arms against the king, and drove him out of his capital at Kutaisi into Abkhazia. Bagrat, accompanied by his mother, was forced to head for Constantinople where the king was kept as a virtual hostage for three years. In the meantime, Liparit installed Bagrat's son George as king and declared himself a regent. After Bagrat's return in 1053, Liparit again warred against him. Eventually, in 1060, he was arrested by his followers and surrendered to the king, who forced him into a monastery under the name of Anton. Liparit died shortly thereafter at Constantinople and was reburied to his patrimonial monastery at Katskhi in Georgia.

Liparit's sons, Ivane and Niania, entered the Byzantine service. Niania died as a Byzantine official at Ani, while Ivane, after a brief adventurous career in the imperial administration in Anatolia, was granted amnesty by the Georgian court.
