= Msakhurtukhutsesi =

Msakhurtukhutsesi (Georgian: მსახურთუხუცესი; lit. the "Master of Servants") was a majordomor of the royal court or master of the royal household in feudal Georgia. He served in charge of the palace and its finances. "Within his province was the supervision of the treasury, the bedchamber, the head of bed keepers, the head of treasurers etc."

== See also ==
- Court officials of the Kingdom of Georgia
