= Phasiane (historical region) =

Region in historical southwestern Georgia

Coordinates: 39.9°N 41.6°E

Phasiane (Greek: Φασιανοί Phasianoi; Armenian: Բասեն Basean; Georgian: ბასიანი Basiani, Turkish: Pasin) is a historical region now part of the Eastern Anatolia region of Turkey, as well as the name given to the region where the Aras River originates.

== Origin ==
According to one version, the name is derived from an ancient tribe called the Phasians (Phazians), mentioned in The Anabasis of the ancient Greek historian Xenofon (5-4th century BC). The name of this tribe seems to have survived in latter-day regional toponyms – Georgian Basiani, Greek Phasiane, Armenian Basean, and Turkish Pasin.

== History ==
In the 8th and 7th centuries BC the province was part of Urartu known as Biani ("land of Bia/Bias"). It was then part of the Satrapy of Armenia and the subsequent Kingdom of Armenia. In 384, the region was contested by Rome and Sasanian Empire. The Persian commander Senitam Khusro defeated the Byzantines in the district of Phasiane, in 605/606. In the 7th century, the province was conquered by an Arab Caliphate. In the 9th century Basean became part of Bagratid Armenia.

In the 10th century, the border between the Byzantine Empire and expanding early Georgian Kingdom of Tao-Klarjeti went along the Aras river, therefore part of northern Basean/Basiani became a domain of the Georgian Bagratids. In 1001, after the death of David Kuropalates, Basean/Basiani were inherited by Byzantine Emperor Basil II, who annexed the Armenian lands (Tayk/Tao, Basean/Basiani), captured by King David Kuropalates to Byzantium and organized them into the theme of Iberia with the capital at Theodosiopolis, forcing the successor Georgian Bagratid ruler Bagrat III to recognize the new rearrangement. Bagrat's son, George I, however, inherited a long-standing claim to David's succession. While Basil II was preoccupied with his Bulgarian campaigns, George gained momentum to invade Tao and Basiani in 1014, which caused unsuccessful Byzantine-Georgian wars. In 1048 and 1049, the Seljuk Turks under Ibrahim Yinal made their first incursion into the Byzantine frontier region of Iberia and defeated a combined Byzantine-Georgian army of 50,000 at the Battle of Kapetrou on 10 September 1048. Many of the eastern Byzantine territories were conquered by the Seljuk Turks between the 1070s and 1080s, but were then retaken by the Georgian King David IV. In the 13th century, at the Battle of Basian, Georgians defeated the army of the Rum Sultanate. The province was part of the Kingdom of Georgia, and then of Principality of Samtskhe until 1545, when Basiani was finally conquered by the Ottoman Empire. In the 17th century, it became a sanjak of Erzurum Vilayet.

== See also ==
- Byzantine–Georgian wars
- Battle of Basian 1203
