= Argveti =

Coordinates: 42.0941°N 43.0816°E

Ancient Argveti shown between Georgian kingdoms of Colchis and Iberia.

Argveti (Georgian: არგვეთი), also Margveti (Georgian: მარგვეთი), is a historic district in Imereti, western Georgia.

== Overview ==
The area lay on the historic Iberian-Lazican frontier, i.e., between what are now eastern and western parts of Georgia. From the 3rd century BC to the 6th century AD, it frequently came under the rule of the kings of Iberia (Kartli) and occasionally covered also some neighbouring areas, particularly Takveri. Argveti was a semi-independent princedom (samtavro) during the early Middle Ages, famed for its 8th-century nobles David and Constantine Mkheidze who fought against the Arabs in the 730s. From the 8th to 11th centuries, Argveti formed a duchy within the Abkhazian Kingdom, which was united with Kartli to form a united Georgian monarchy in 1008. It was then a patrimony of the powerful Baghvashi ducal family, which went back in 1103, allowing King David IV to donate part of Argveti to Gelati Monastery. What was left from the Baghvashi dominion was granted to the Amanelisdze family in the 12th-13th centuries. In the late medieval period, Argveti was distributed among the fiefdoms of various noble families of Imereti, particularly the Tsereteli, Abashidze, Chkheidze, and Mkheidze.

Some of the important historic monuments scattered across the area are the fortresses of Shorapani, Skanda, Sveri, Chikha, Mukhuri, and the churches of Ubisi, Jruchi, Tabakini, and Katskhi.
