= Trialeti =

Coordinates: 41°30′N 44°10′E

Trialeti თრიალეთი
- Historical Region
- Map highlighting the historical region of Trialeti in Georgia
- Country: Georgia
- Mkhare: Kvemo Kartli
- Capital: Tsalka

Trialeti (Georgian: თრიალეთი [t̪ʰɾiäle̞t̪ʰi]) is a mountainous area in central Georgia. In Georgian, its name means "a place of wandering". The Trialeti Range is a part of the greater Trialeti Region. It corresponds to the modern-day Tsalka Municipality.
