= History of North Ossetia–Alania =

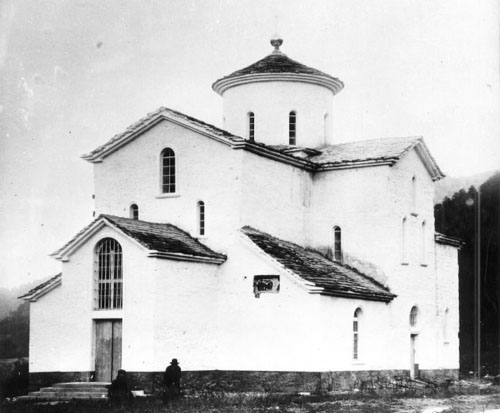
A 10th-century Alanian church in Arkhyz, as photographed after its reconstruction and remodeling in 1897.

The Republic of North Ossetia – Alania is a federal subject of Russia (a republic), located in the Caucasus region.

== Early history ==
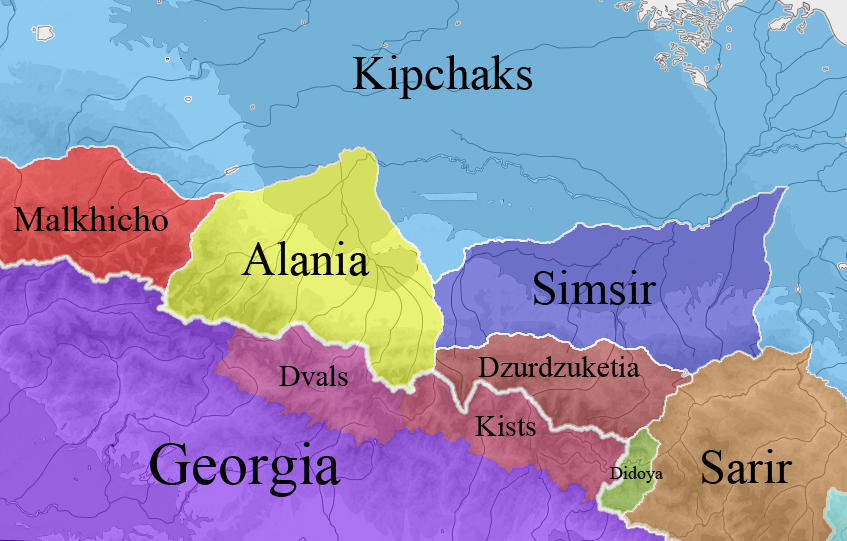
Map of territory of medieval Alania in 1124

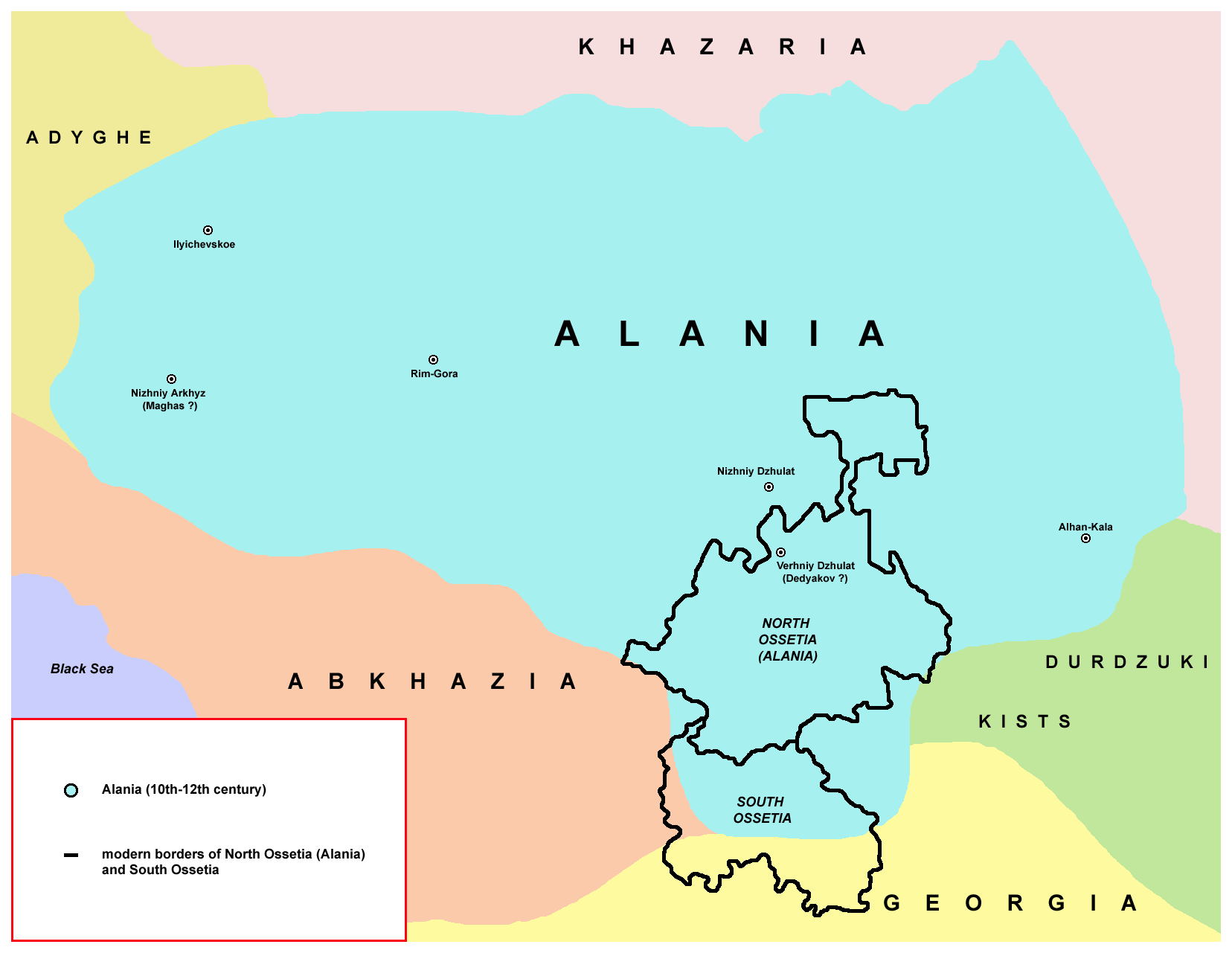
Map of territory of modern North Ossetia – Alania within medieval Alania (9th-12th century), according to claims on non-official sources linking Ossetian historian Ruslan S. Bzarov.

Political map of the Caucasus region in 1060

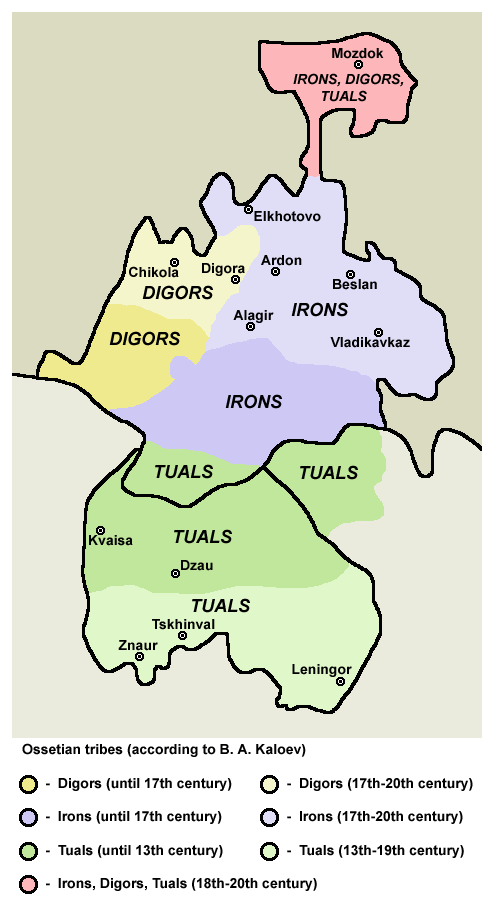
Ossetian tribes, according to claims on non-official sources linking Ossetian historian B. A. Kaloev.

The territory of North Ossetia has been inhabited for thousands of years, being both a very fertile agricultural region and a key trade route through the Caucasus Mountains. The ancestors of the present inhabitants were a people called the Alans, a warlike nomadic people who spoke an Iranian language. The First Iranian-speaking tribes appeared in the Caucasus in the 7th century BC. By about the 9th century, the kingdom of Alania had arisen and had been converted to Christianity by Byzantine missionaries. An archbishopric was established in western Alania under the authority of the Patriarchate of Constantinople, and many large churches were constructed (Zelenchuk churches, Shoana Church, Senty Church). Alania became a powerful state in the Caucasus, profiting greatly from the legendary Silk Road to China, which passed through its territory.

From the Middle Ages onwards, Alania was beset by external enemies and suffered repeated invasions. The invasions of the Mongols and Tatars in the 13th century decimated the population, who were now known as Ossetians. Around 1395, Tamerlane's army defeated the Alans near Mount Elbrus. In the 15th century, Ossetians were driven out of the lowland territories by the Kabardians. Islam was first spread among the ossetians by the Crimean Tatars. Islam was introduced in the 17th century through the Kabardians, a Muslim Caucasian people. Incursions by the Khanate of Crimea and the Ottoman Empire eventually pushed Alania/Ossetia into an alliance with Russia in the 18th century. North Ossetia was among the first areas of the northern Caucasus to come under Russian domination, starting in 1774, and the capital, Vladikavkaz, was the first Russian military outpost in the region. Ossetians in the South Caucasus often committed robberies in Kartli, until 1830, when Ossetia came under Russian control.

== Imperial Russia ==
The arrival of Imperial Russia led to the rapid development of the region, with industries founded and road and rail connections built to overcome Ossetia's isolation. The Georgian Military Road, which is still a crucial transport link across the mountains, was built in 1799 and a railway line was built from Vladikavkaz to Rostov-on-Don in Russia proper. The Ossetians' traditional culture inevitably underwent some Russification, but their new connections with Russia and the West helped to boost local culture; the first books in the Ossetian language were printed in the late 18th century. In 1830, a military campaign led by General Ivan Abkhazov brought North Ossetia under tighter control of the Russian Empire. The area became part of the Terskaya Region of Russia in the mid-19th century.

== Russian Revolution and USSR ==
After the Russian Revolution, North Ossetia became part of the short-lived Soviet Mountain Republic in 1921. It became the North Ossetian Autonomous Oblast on July 7, 1924 and was then made the North Ossetian Autonomous Soviet Socialist Republic (ASSR), within the Russian Soviet Federated Socialist Republic, on December 5, 1936. In World War II, North Ossetia saw the high-water mark of the invasion of Russia by Nazi Germany; the Germans attempted to seize Vladikavkaz in November 1942 but were repulsed.

During and after the war Stalin undertook massive deportations of whole ethnicities explaining this by anti-Sovietism, separatism and collaboration with Nazi Germany. In particular, this affected Balkars, Chechens, and Ingushs. As of 1944, the part of the Prigorodny District on the right bank of the Terek River had been part of Chechen-Ingush ASSR, but it was granted to North Ossetia in following Joseph Stalin's deportation of the Chechens and Ingush to Central Asia. Although they were eventually allowed to return from the exile, they were generally not allowed to settle in the original territories. Instead, in 1957, three districts of Stavropol Krai were granted to Chechen-Ingush ASSR. A local law passed in 1982 actually prohibited ethnic Ingush from obtaining residency permits in North Ossetia.

== After the USSR ==
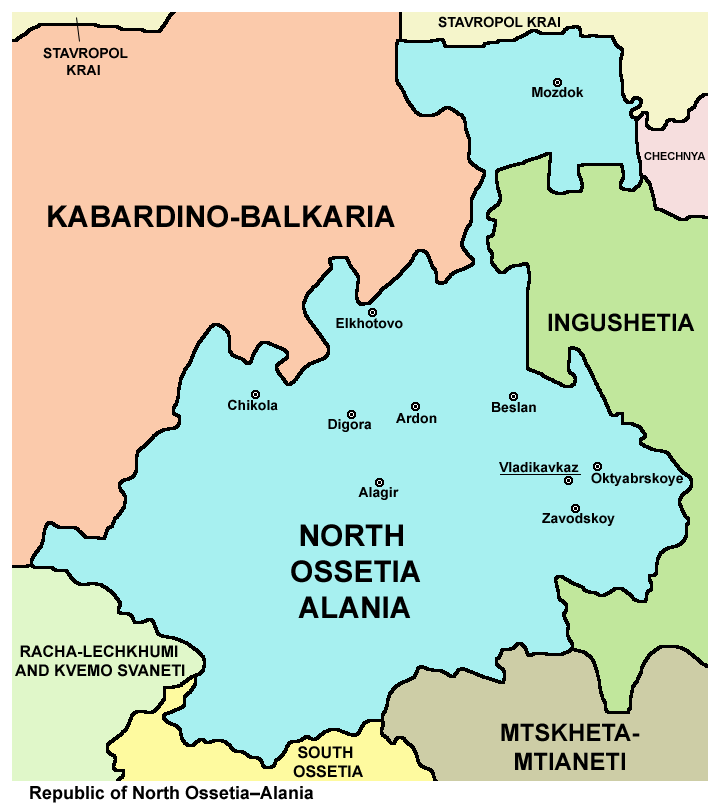
Map of modern North Ossetia–Alania

North Ossetian SSR finally became the first autonomous republic of the RSFSR to declare national sovereignty, on June 20, 1990 (although it still remains firmly part of Russia). In 1991, North Ossetian SSR was renamed the Republic of North Ossetia–Alania.

The dissolution of the Soviet Union posed particular problems for the Ossetian people, which were divided between North Ossetia, which was part of the Russian SFSR, and South Ossetia, part of the Georgian SSR. In December 1990 the Supreme Soviet of Georgia abolished the autonomous Ossetian enclave amid the rising ethnic tensions in the region, and much of the population fled across the border to North Ossetia or Georgia proper. Some 70,000 South Ossetian refugees were resettled in North Ossetia, sparking clashes with the predominantly Ingush population in the Prigorodny District. That led to Ossetian-Ingush conflict.

As well as dealing with the effects of the conflict in South Ossetia, North Ossetia has had to deal with refugees and the occasional spillover of fighting from the war in neighboring Chechnya. The bloodiest incident by far was the September 2004 Beslan hostage crisis, in which Muslim separatists of Shamil Basayev seized control of a school. In the firefight between the terrorists and Russian forces that ended the crisis, 335 civilians, the majority of them children, died.

== See also ==
- History of Ossetia
- History of South Ossetia
