= Arkhyz =

Arkhyz Архыз
- village
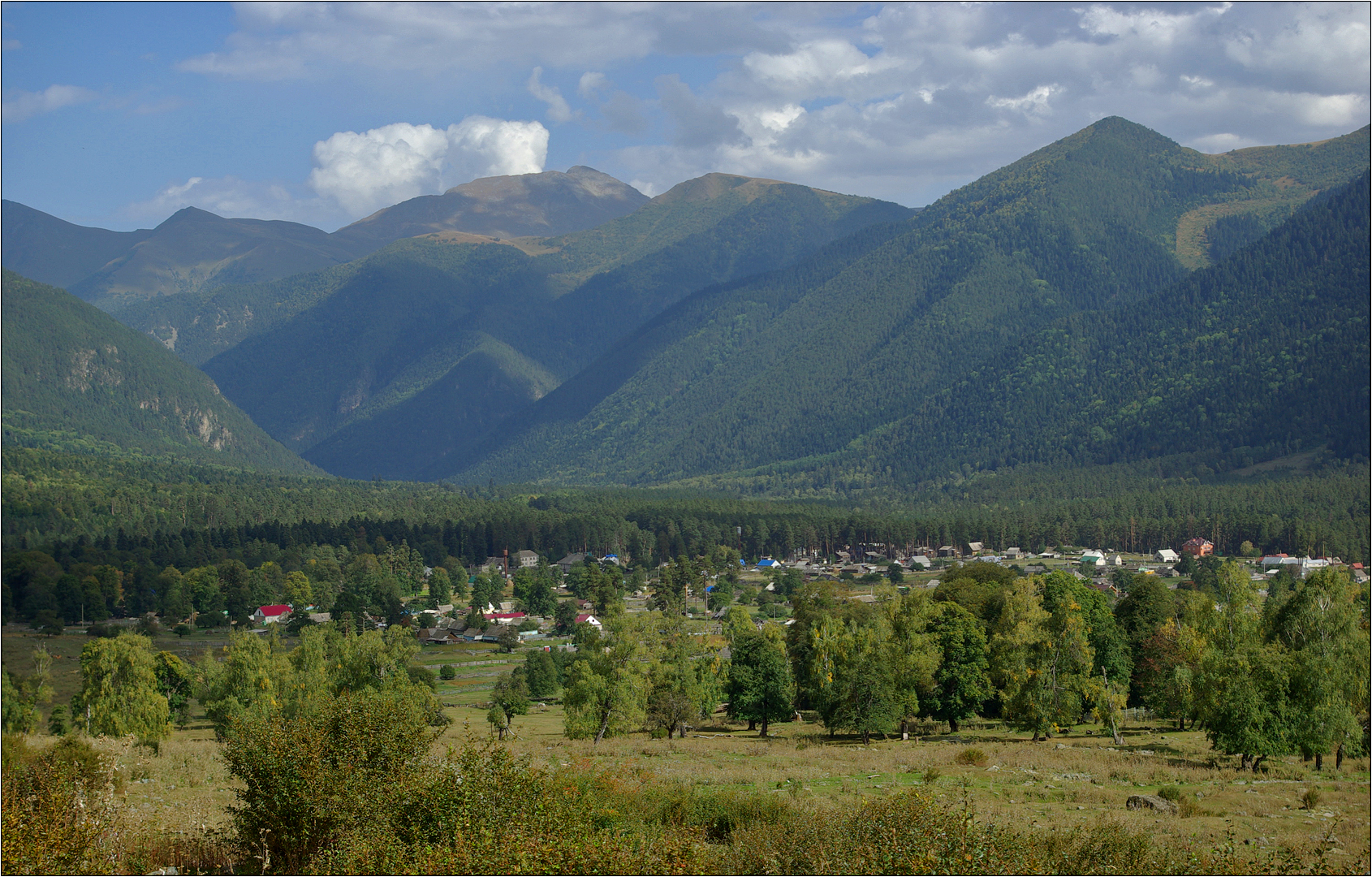
- The village of Arkhyz
- Interactive map of Arkhyz
- Location of Arkhyz Arkhyz (Karachay-Cherkessia)
- Coordinates: 43.565°N 41.278889°E
- Country: Russia
- Federal subject: Karachay-Cherkessia
- Founded: 1923
- Elevation: 1,470 m (4,820 ft)

Population (2010 Census)
  - Total: 505
  - Estimate (2021): 849 (+68.1%)

Municipal status
  - Municipal district: Zelenchuksky District
  - Rural settlement: Arkhyz Rural District
- Time zone: UTC+3 (MSK)
- Postal code: 369152
- OKTMO ID: 91610402101

Arkhyz (also Nizhny Arkhyz, Russian: Архыз; Karachay-Balkar: Ырхыз, Irxız lit. 'mudflows') is a village in the valley of the Bolshoy Zelenchuk River, in the Republic of Karachay–Cherkessia, Greater Caucasus, Russia, about 70 km inland from the Black Sea shore. The modern village was founded in 1923 near the confluence of the Arkhyz and Pshish rivers. It is located in a mountainous region in the vicinity of the eponymous aul sitting at an altitude of 1,450 meters. The elevation of the surrounding mountains is more than 3,000 meters above the sea. The population is 505 (2010 census).

== Zelenchuksky Churches ==
The Zelenchuksky Churches are an archaeological preserve extending for 4 kilometres (2.5 mi) around the ruins of Nizhnearkhyzskoe gorodishche, tentatively identified as the medieval capital of Alania, a Christian state destroyed by the hordes of Möngke Khan in the 13th century. No Byzantine document mentions the name of this city, whereas al-Mas'udi refers to it as Ma'as, or Maghas.

The most remarkable feature of the site is a cluster of three early medieval churches, whose construction is associated with the missionary activities of Patriarch Nicholas Mystikos in the Northern Caucasus. These structures bear much resemblance to the Shoana Church and Senty Church, situated in the neighbouring valleys. In the 19th century the churches were affiliated with the monastery of St. Alexander Nevsky. A monastic community was revived there after the fall of the Soviet Union.

The North Zelenchuksky Church is supposed to have been the cathedral of the diocese of Alania between the 10th and 13th centuries. The dome rises to a height of 21 meters; the western wall is twice as long. The narthex formerly contained a baptistery. A 19th-century traveller described the faded Byzantine frescoes that were still visible on its walls.

The Central Zelenchuksky Church appears to have been conceived somewhat earlier than the two others, in the form of a regular cross, but was extended to the west during or shortly following the construction. It is much larger than the South Zelenchuksky Church, which was built of coarse rubble masonry, extensively restored by the monks in 1899, fell into disuse during the Soviet years, and was reconsecrated to St. Elijah in 1991. The South Church bears the distinction of being the oldest functioning church in all of Russia.

Within 30 km from Nizhny Arkhyz a short grave inscription (Zelenchuk Inscription) was discovered in 1888. Although it is written in Greek characters, the inscription (alternatively dated to 941 or 963) was interpreted by Vasily Abayev as the earliest preserved text in the Ossetic language. Another tourist attraction in the valley is a mandylion-type rock painting of Christ, datable to the 10th century but discovered only recently.

== Observatory ==
Arkhyz is also the site of a Soviet astrophysical observatory which formerly boasted the world's largest solid-mirror reflecting telescope (6 meters in diameter).
