= South Zelenchuksky Church =

10th c. church in Karachay-Cherkessia Republic, Russia

South Zelenchucksky Church
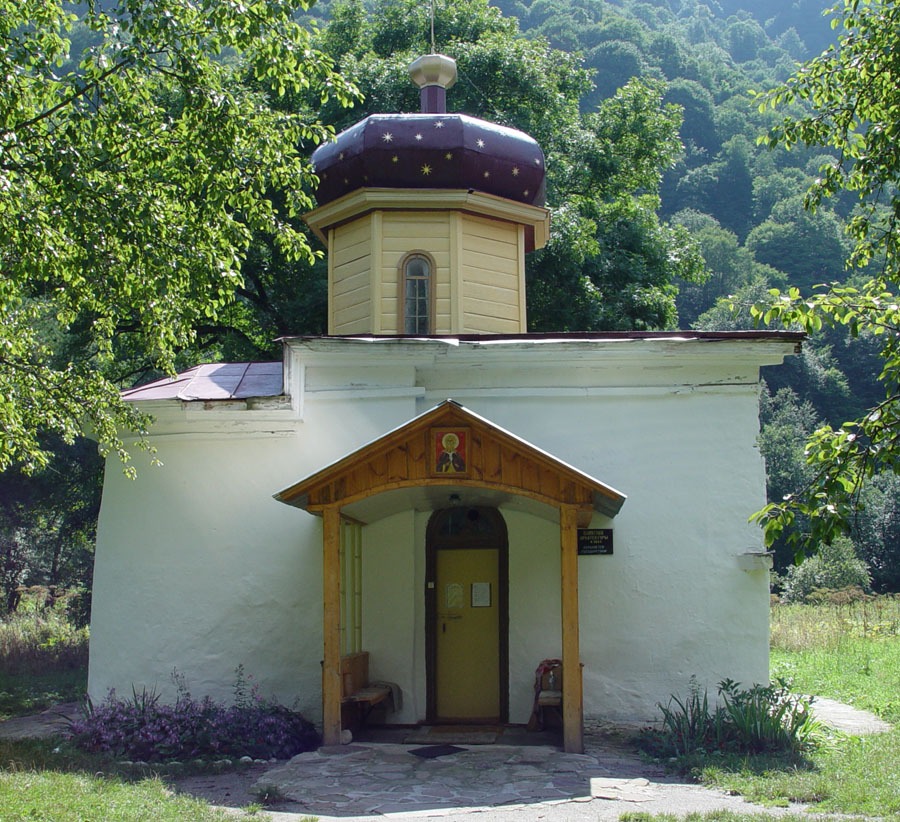

- Location within Karachay-Cherkessia Location within Russia

Religion
- Affiliation: Alanian
- Status: Preserved

Location
- Location: Arkhyz, Russia
- Interactive map of South Zelenchucksky Church
- Coordinates: 43.6848°N 41.4756°E

Architecture
- Style: Byzantine-style
- Groundbreaking: 10th-11th century
- Completed: 19th century
- Dome: 1

The South Zelenchuksky Church is a former Alanian church located in modern-day Arkhyz, Russia, dating to the late 10th century or early 11th century. The church's modest size suggests that it was privately owned, potentially by a member of the nobility.

== History ==
The South Zelenchuksky Church dates back to the late 10th or early 11th century, and is one of three cross-in-square churches known to have been built in the Alanian Diocese, the other two being the North Zelenchuksky Church and the Shoana Church. Unlike the other two churches, the South Zelenchuksky Church is a simple cross-domed church without beams. The church was renovated at the end of the 19th century, during which a cornice was added under the dome, the walls were plastered, the frescoes were painted over, the slab flooring was replaced with wooden flooring, and the drum was covered in a wooden facade. Additionally, because the church's original doorway was plastered over, a new doorway was built into the church's northern wall. After the renovation, the building was consecrated as a church of the Alexander-Athos monastery. Because of the renovation, the church is now one of the most studied cross-domed churches in Alanya.

== Architecture ==
The South Zelenchuksky Church is a three-apse three-nave cross-in-square building based on four square pillars, and plastered with a thin layer of grout. The church is built out of sandstone blocks, with largest of these blocks being on the bottom, the smallest in the middle, and the medium-sized blocks on top. It is possible that the church was covered with flat stone slabs. The outside of the building is 8.5 meters long and 7.75 meters wide, while the inside is 7.7 meters long and 6.16 meters wide. The dome of the building is asymmetrical and has a length of 1.8 meters and a width of 2.7 meters. The northern and central naves of the church have the same width, while the southern nave is much narrower. Differences between this church and similar churches include its arches, which are uneven and are narrower than its pillars, and its vaults, which are shaped differently than most Alanian and Abkhazian architecture.

Due to the elevation of the corner compartments of the church, it is believed that the church originally had a curved coating. The church's apses are semi-circular and small, with side apses being nearly the same height as the central one. Each apse has a window with a corbel arch, indicating that this church was built later than most other Alanian churches. Originally, the church's windows were located in its northern and southern walls, however, the windows were plastered over and moved during the church's renovation.

== Bibliography ==
- Виноградов А. Ю., Белецкий Д. В. Нижний Архыз и Сенты — древнейшие храмы России. Проблемы христианского искусства Алании и Северо-Западного Кавказа. — М.: Индрик, 2011. — 392 с. ISBN 978-5-91674-127-8
- Кузнецов В. А. Зодчество феодальной Алании. — Орджоникидзе: «Ир», 1977. — 176 с.
- Кузнецов В.А. Нижний Архыз в X-XII веках. Ставрополь, 1993. — 464 c. ISBN 5-88530-044-5.
- Пищулина В.В. Христианское храмовое зодчество Северного Кавказа периода средневековья. Ростов-на-дону, 2006. — 320 с. ISBN 5-87872-343-3
- Сысоев В. М. Поездка на реки: Зеленчук, Кубань и Тиберду летом 1895 года. // Материалы по археологии Кавказа : журнал. — М.: Московский государственный университет, 1898. — No. 7. — С. 115–145.
- Отчет гг. Нарышкиных, совершивших путешествие на Кавказ (Сванетию) с археологический целью в 1867 году // Известия Императорского Русского археологического общества. — СПб., 1876. — Т. VIII. Вып. 4. — С. 362–366.

== See also ==
- Zelenchuk churches
- Central Zelenchuksky Church
