= Zelenchuk churches =

Coordinates: 43°33′54″N 41°16′44″E

The Zelenchuksky Churches, also known as the Lower-Arkhyz Churches, are located within an archaeological preserve that stretches for four kilometers around the ruins of Lower Arkhyz hillfort near Arkhyz, Karachay–Cherkessia, Russian Federation. The site is tentatively identified as the medieval capital of Alania, a Christian state that was destroyed by the hordes of Möngke Khan in the 13th century.

== History ==
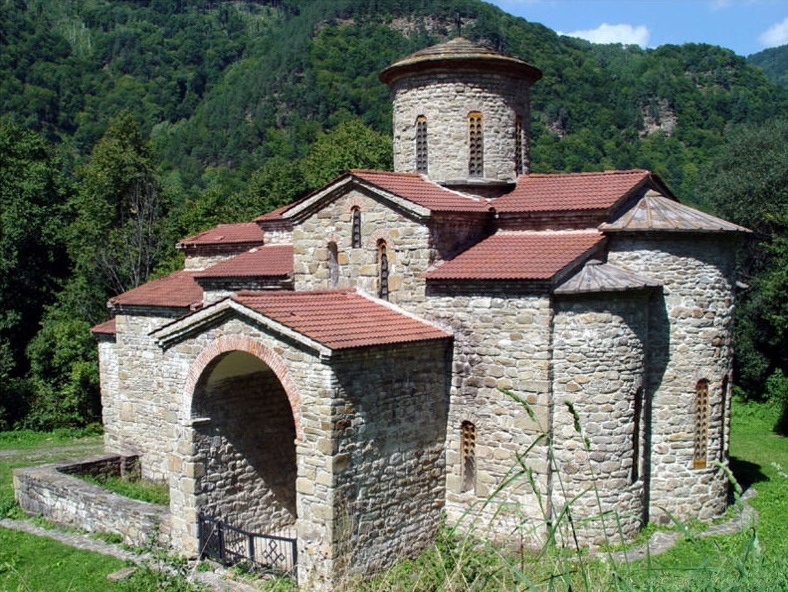
North Church is dedicated to St. George.

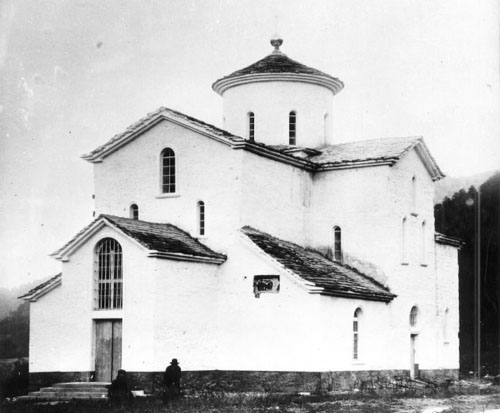
Central Church after repairs in 1897.

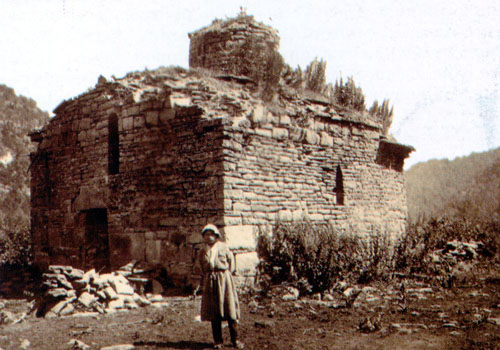
View of the South Church in 1882.

No Byzantine document mentions the name of this city, whereas al-Mas'udi refers to it as Ma'as, or Maghas. The most remarkable feature of the site is a cluster of three early medieval churches, whose construction is associated with the missionary activities of Patriarch Nicholas Mystikos in the Northern Caucasus. These structures bear much resemblance to the Shoana Church and Senty Church, situated in the neighbouring valleys. In the 19th century the churches were affiliated with the monastery of St. Alexander Nevsky. A monastic community was revived there after the fall of the Soviet Union.

The North Zelenchuksky Church is supposed to have been the cathedral of the diocese of Alania between the 10th and 13th centuries. The dome rises to a height of 21 meters; the western wall is twice as long. The narthex formerly contained a baptistery. A 19th-century traveller described the faded Byzantine frescoes that were still visible on its walls.

The Central Zelenchuksky Church appears to have been conceived somewhat earlier than the two others, in the form of a regular cross, but was extended to the west during or shortly following the construction. It is much larger than the South Zelenchuksky Church, which was built of coarse rubble masonry, extensively restored by the monks in 1899, fell into disuse during the Soviet years, and was reconsecrated to St. Elijah in 1991. The South Church bears the distinction of being the oldest functioning church in all of Russia.

Within 30 km from Nizhny Arkhyz a short grave inscription (Zelenchuk Inscription) was discovered in 1888. Although it is written in Greek characters, the inscription (alternatively dated to 941 or 963) was interpreted by Vasily Abayev as the earliest preserved text in the Ossetic language. Another tourist attraction in the valley is a mandylion-type rock painting of Christ, datable to the 10th century but discovered only recently.
