= North Zelenchuksky Church =

Church in Arkhyz, Russia

North Church
- Северный Зеленчукский храм
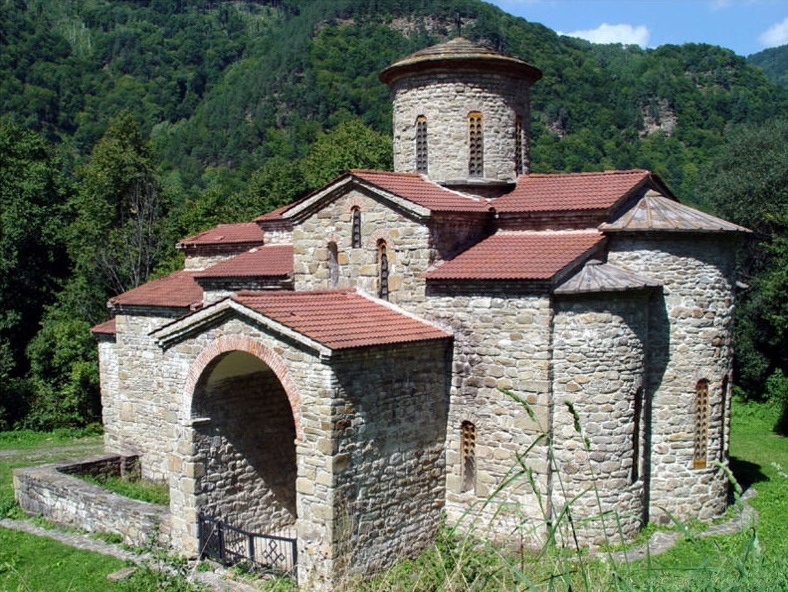

Religion
- Affiliation: Eastern Orthodox

Location
- Location: Lower Arkhyz settlement, Karachay-Cherkessia
- Country: Russia
- Interactive map of North Church

Architecture
- Type: Church
- Style: Byzantine-style
- Groundbreaking: Late 10th to early 11th century
- Dome: 1

The North Church (Russian: Северный Зеленчукский храм), also known as the North Zelenchuk Church, is an Alanian Eastern Orthodox church dating from the late 10th to early 11th century, located at the Lower Arkhyz settlement in the valley of the Bolshoy Zelenchuk River in Karachay-Cherkessia, Russia.

The North Church is one of three surviving cross-domed churches from the 10th–11th centuries located at the Lower Arkhyz settlement. The oldest of these, the Middle Zelenchuk Church, was built in the 10th century and served as the cathedral of all Alania. The North Church, erected in the late 10th or early 11th century, was probably the principal church of a large monastery. The Small South Church was the last to be built, in the late 11th or early 12th century, and may have belonged to one of the noble families of Alania.

== History ==
In antiquity, a city stood on the territory of the Lower Arkhyz settlement that for several centuries was an important ecclesiastical and economic center of Alania. The residence of the metropolitan bishop of Alania was established there, along with the monastery of the Alanian ruler, whose principal church was probably the North Church. The function of the Middle and North churches has been a subject of debate among scholars. According to V. A. Kuznetsov, the North Church was built earlier and served as the cathedral of the metropolitan bishop of Alania, while the Middle Church, built later, was primarily a monastic foundation. Modern researchers, primarily D. V. Beletsky and A. Yu. Vinogradov, are inclined to the opposite view. The important role of this church for both secular and ecclesiastical authorities is indicated, first, by the presence of rich burials in the south aisle—belonging to the church and monastery clergy and possibly the Alanian ruler and his wife—and, second, by the three-tiered synthronon raised in the central apse. Such a design of the synthronon is also found in Byzantine churches of that period and indicates "an obvious presence of the bishop".

The location of the North Church also corresponds to a monastic character: it was set apart from the center of the city and stood on its outskirts, as if isolated from the outside world. A large necropolis surrounded the church. The exact date of construction is unknown, but the church was probably erected in the late 10th or early 11th century (before 1012/1013 or 1066/1067). It is also impossible to establish unambiguously the origin of the masters who carried out the construction; they may have been Abkhazian masters working alongside local Alanian builders.

== Architecture ==
The North Church is a cross-domed church of the inscribed-cross type. It has a nine-bay structure, joined on the east by a three-part bema connected by passages to three semicircular apses, and on the west by a two-story open narthex, which contained galleries opening into the naos. In the northwest corner of the narthex are the remains of a staircase leading up to the galleries and a water tank (possibly a baptistery). On the exterior, the church is almost entirely without decoration: the only decorative element is a scalloped cornice made of plinth brick. The same cornice was once present on the apse but has not survived.

The drum is pierced by eight narrow windows. The dome rests, by way of three-tiered support arches, on four rectangular piers connected to the walls by small support arches thrown from the piers onto the ledges of the bema walls on the east and onto wall pilasters on the other three sides. The width and dimensions of the piers do not match the width of the support arches, which is why large support arches are lowered onto the parallelepipeds ("shelves") of the piers. This mismatch and unevenness of the vertical lines of masonry indicate a low level of skill on the part of the North Church's builders.

The open narthex adjoins the church on the outside; in it, during services, the unbaptized probably still stood. On the eastern walls of the narthex are cult niches. In the central apse stands a three-tiered synthronon that was originally covered with a layer of cement, the remains of which were also found on the floors of all three apses. Wall benches have been preserved in the naos. The altar was separated from the main space of the church by a two-tiered step.

== Frescoes ==
The walls of the church were plastered and painted; up to the present day, the frescoes have practically not survived—with the exception of a geometric pattern in the north window of the central apse. However, in the 1960s, between the north windows of the drum, the image of a human figure could be distinguished, and at the top of the northeastern pier the face of a saint framed by a halo was visible.

At the end of the 19th century, the frescoes of the North Church were sketched by D. M. Strukov; however, these sketches were made carelessly and do not allow judgment of the style and quality of execution of the ancient frescoes.

Sketches by Dmitry Strukov

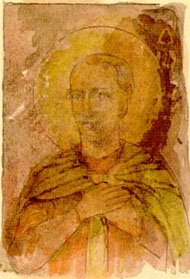

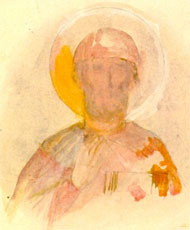

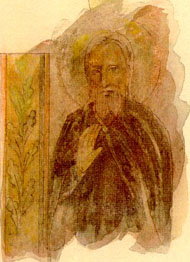

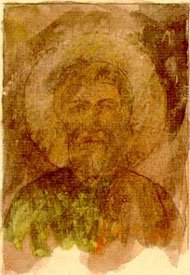

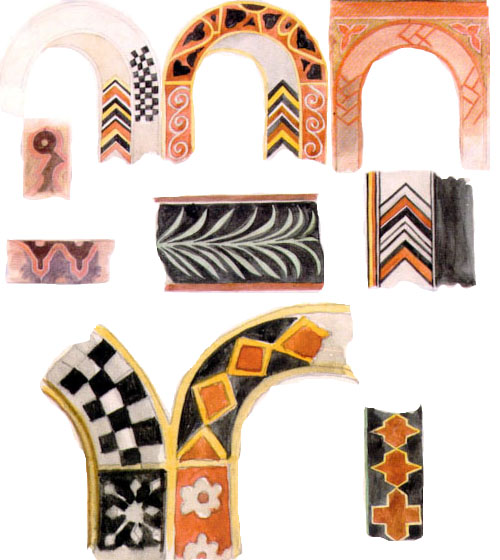

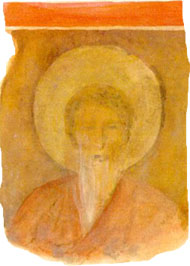

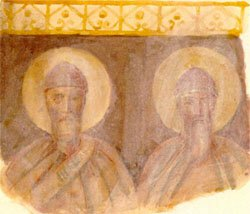

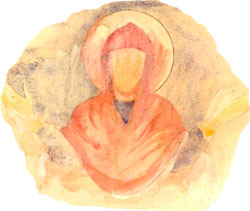

== See also ==
- Zelenchuksky Churches
- Senty Church
- Shoana Church

== Bibliography ==
- Beletsky, D. V.; Vinogradov, A. Yu. (2011). Нижний Архыз и Сенты — древнейшие храмы России. Проблемы христианского искусства Алании и Северо-Западного Кавказа [Nizhny Arkhyz and Senty — the Oldest Churches of Russia. Problems of Christian Art in Alania and the Northwestern Caucasus] (in Russian). Moscow: Indrik.
- Vinogradov, A. Yu.; Beletsky, D. V. (2013). "К вопросу о византийском влиянии на архитектуру Кавказа (IX–X вв.)" [On the Question of Byzantine Influence on the Architecture of the Caucasus (9th–10th centuries)]. Vizantiysky Vremennik. 72 (97): 254–258.
- Vinogradov, A. Yu. (2006). "Очерк истории аланского христианства в X–XII вв." [Essay on the History of Alanian Christianity in the 10th–12th centuries]. In ΚΑΝΙΣΚΙΟΝ. Jubilee Collection in Honor of the 60th Anniversary of Professor Igor Sergeyevich Chichurov. Moscow.
- Kuznetsov, V. A. (1993). Нижний Архыз в X–XII веках [Lower Arkhyz in the 10th–12th centuries]. Stavropol.
- Kuznetsov, V. A. (1964). "Северный Зеленчукский храм X века" [North Zelenchuk Church of the 10th Century]. Sovetskaya Arkheologiya (in Russian) (4). Moscow: Nauka.
