= Central Zelenchuksky Church =

10th c. Alanian church in Karachay-Cherkessia, Russia

Coordinates: 43.684°N 41.476°E

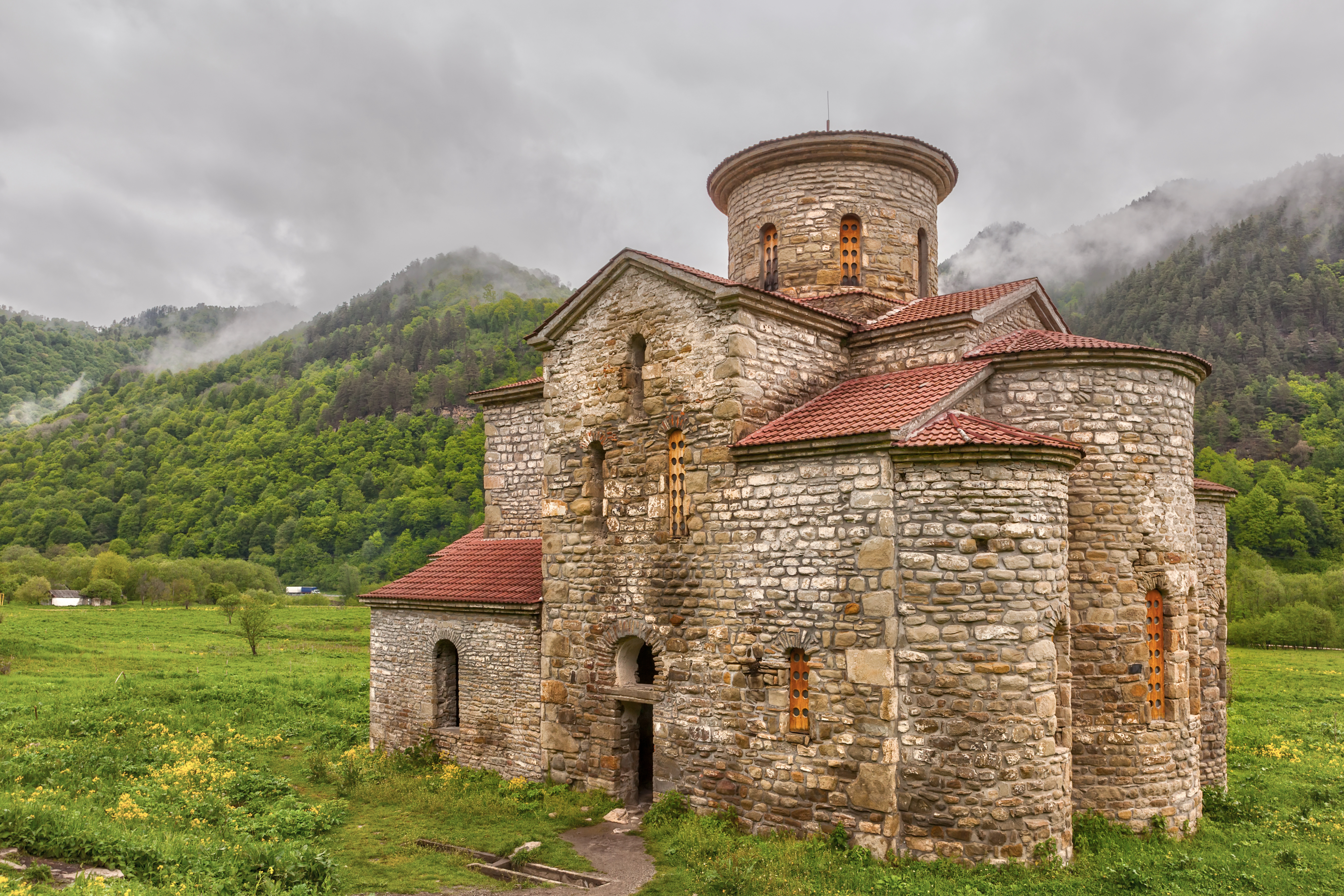
Central Zelenchuksky Church

Central Zelenchuchsky Church is an Alanian church, located in the Lower-Arkhyz settlement in Russia's Karachay-Cherkessia Republic. It is the oldest church in this settlement.

It was built in two steps: construction began in the early 10th century, and finished in 932, when Christians were banished from the empire. The second stage finished around 950-960 when Alans returned to Christianity, with only small changes made from the original plan.

== History ==
The Lower-Arkhyz settlement was located on an important trade and military route, connecting the steppes of Northern Caucasus with Transcaucasia and Black Sea. The settlement was an important spiritual and economic center of Alania. A residence of the metropolitan bishop, more than 10 churches and, supposedly, a Greek factory were there. The Middle church is located 800 meters to the south of the Northern church. The Southern Church was In the central part of the settlement and survives in reconstructed form.

Construction started not long before the banishment of Christians from Alania in 932. It was constructed by Abkhazian masters in the form of a Latin cross with the addition of a Southeastern compartment. After the return of Christianity in the middle of the 10th century, the construction was finished by masters from Anatolia (supposedly, Cappadocia) with the addition of a northeastern compartment. Stone chairs were replaced by wooden ones. These builders supposedly, also built Senty Church in 965. The church was probably meant to be for funerals and memorials of the Alanian rulers and clergy. This function was inherited by the Northern Church, and the Middle Church became the cathedral. The settlement continued until the Mongol invasion in the 13th century

In the late 19th century the church was used as a monastery. The monks made several additions to the building. The original view of the church was depicted in drawings by D.M. Strukov, descriptions of P. Sinayskiy and 19th century photographs. The monks’ additions include two compartments on the west corner, openings in the west part, which were made into doors, a renewed narthex and northern entrance. Walls of the church were plastered and whitewashed and interior was decorated with stucco, which led to disappearance of almost all the frescoes. Like all of the cross-in-square churches in Alania (except Southern church) it featured a gable roof, but originally they were curvilinear. From ancient times it was covered in bream, instead of tiles. Many attempts were made to reconstruct the original coating, but they were not durable, and during the last renovation it was covered with tiles.

== Architecture ==
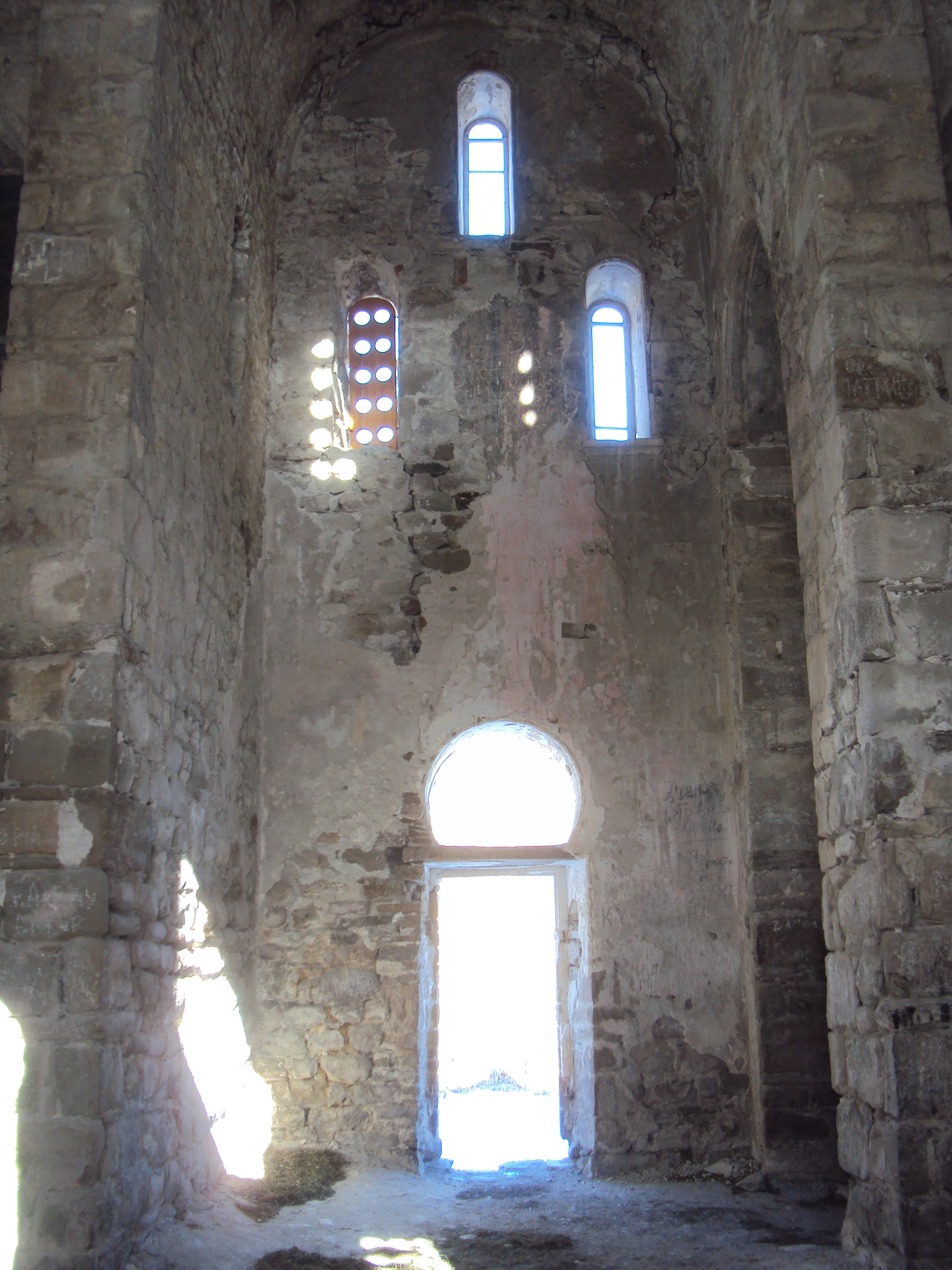
Interior of the Church

Dome architecture came to Alania via cross-shaped churches. Before that, basilicas dominated Alanian architecture. The church involved unusual planning – in the form of a semi-free Latin cross, while the original project of 920s was more akin to a free Latin cross.

The church is built from rough sandstone blocks on lime using shell masonry. The plinth was partially used in the arches and sconces. The floor was made from the ceramic crumb-in-lime mixture, displaying a distinctive pink color. The construction seam on the joint of the northern part, North-Eastern compartment and also different thickness of the walls and pilasters indicate that the original project was changed in the 950-960-s.

The distinctive features of the Middle temple are the Eastern corner compartments, which are neither completely open nor completely isolated, since they are separated from the Eastern sleeve by walls with cut passages. Pilasters are present in the interior of the temple only on the Northern and southern walls of the Western and Eastern sleeves. The cylindrical drum of the dome of the church is the biggest among churches in Alania. Eight narrow arched Windows are in the drum. The temple dome rests on the corners of the building.

Most of the frescoes did not survive. The remains of the second stage of the painting (the first decoration was probably incomplete and was located mainly in the apses) are preserved on the northern and southern walls of the cross' lateral branches. The northern wall displays an image of two Holy martyrs above the entrance between the windows. In the Central part of the southern wall, between the door and the windows, a huge (about 3 m) image of saints Constantine and Helena holding a large cross is visible. To the right of them under the window there is a small fragment of the image of the warrior. On the walls of the Western sleeve were depicted the Holy warriors-horsemen. On one of the arches under the dome in the 19th century was the figure of the prophet Daniel.

== See also ==
- Zelenchuk churches
- South Zelenchuksky Church
