= Senty Church =

Christian church in Karachay-Cherkessia, Russia

Coordinates: 43°38′13″N 41°51′56″E

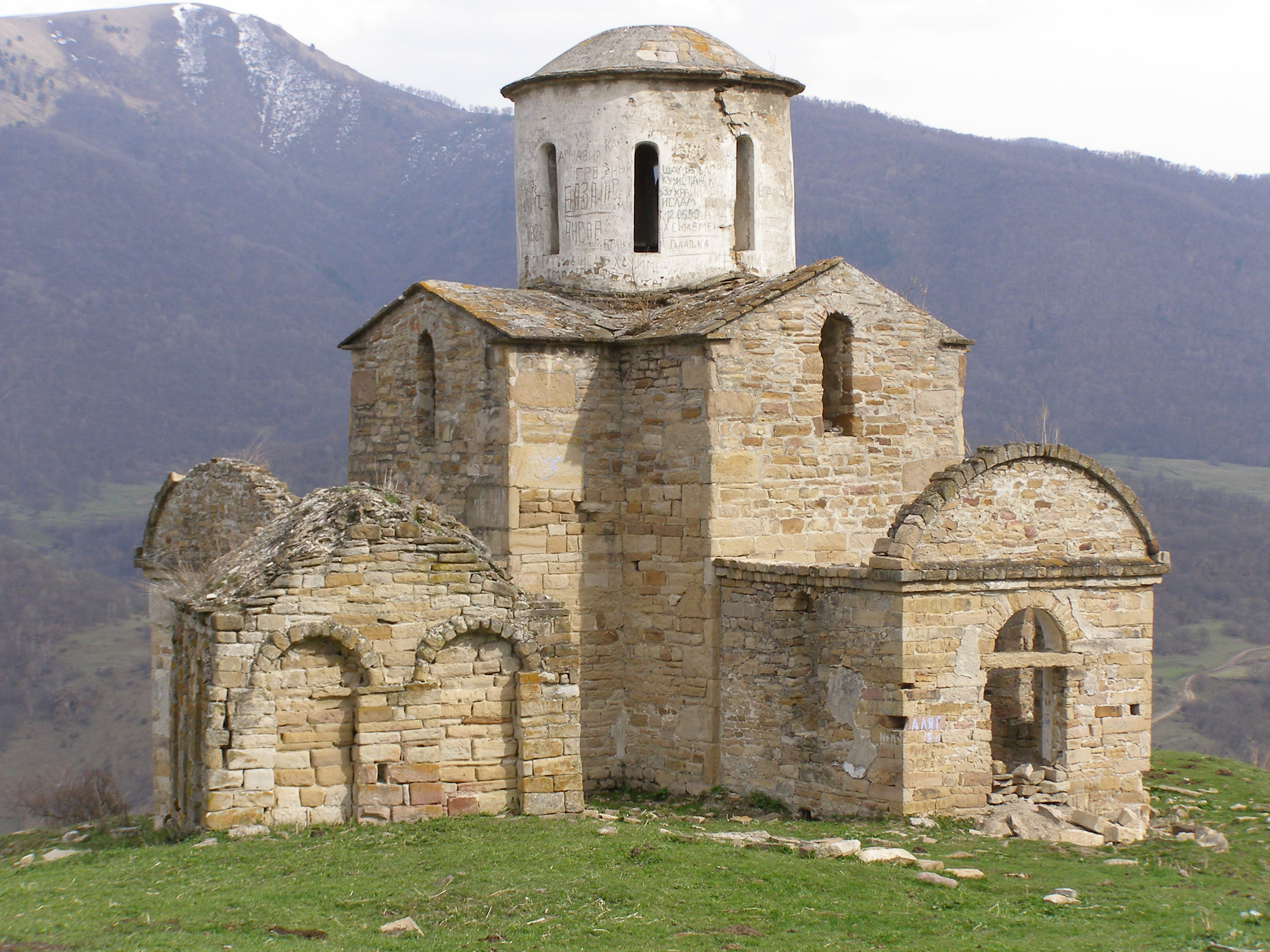

Religion
- Affiliation: Christian

Location
- Location: Karachay-Cherkessia
- Interactive map of Senty Church

Architecture
- Style: Byzantine-style
- Groundbreaking: 10th Century
- Completed: 19th Century
- Dome: 1

Senty Church (Russian: Сентинский храм) is a Christian church built in 965 in the territory of modern Karachay-Cherkessia (Russian Federation). It is situated on the left bank of the Teberda River, near the village of Nizhnyaya Teberda, 18 km south of Karachaevsk. Senty Church is the earliest dated church in Russia.

== History ==
Precise dating of the church is based on the inscription found on the northern wall of the eastern aisle. The text is as follows:

+ Ἐνεκεν[ίσ]θ(η), ἐνεώσ[θ(η)] ὁ να[ὸς] τ(ῆς)

ὑπεραγίας θ(εοτόκ)ου ἐπὴ βασηλ[είας

Νηκηφώρου, Βασηλ[είου] καὶ [Κωνσταντίνου

κὲ Δα(υὶ)δ ἐξουσηωκράτορ(ος) [Ἀλανίας

κ(αὶ) Μαρίας ἐξουσ[η]ωκράτ[ορίσσης

μ]ην(ὴ) Ἀπρη(λίου) β´, ἡμέρᾳ ἁγ[ή]ου Α[ντιπάσχα (?)

δηὰ χηρὸς Θεοδώρου, μητ[ροπο-

λ(ίτου) καθηγη(ασμένου) Ἀλανί(ας), ἀπ[ὸ] κ[τί-

σε(ως) κό(σμου) ἔτ(ους) ςυογ´. Ἀν[ε-

γράφε[το] δηὰ χειρὸς [τοῦ δεῖνος

ἀποκρησ(ιαρίου) πατρ(ικίου).

Which means:

+Sanctified, renewed the church

of the Blessed Virgin is in the reign of

Nikephoro, Basil and Constantine

and David, exusiocrator (a special title for ruler of Alania, byzantine exarch) of Alania

and Maria, exusiocratoriss

on 2 April, in the day of the saint Antipascha,

by the hand of Theodorе,

sanctified mitropolite of Alania

in the year 6473 [964/965 in the modern Gregorian calendar] from the creation of the world.

Written by the hand of [name],

apocrisiarius patricius

Like the Shoana Church and the Arkhyz Cathedral, Senty Church is believed to have been constructed in connection with missionary activities of Patriarch Nicholas Mystikos in the 10th century.

In the second half oh the 19th century an orthodox Spassko-Preobrazhenskiy convent was built near the Senty church. The church was much altered at the urging of the nuns, its original form was changed.

In the soviet times the convent was turned into an orphan house. At the present time it is being rebuilt.

Near the church lie the ruins of a mausoleum which is also dates back to the 10th century. Supposedly it was intended to be used as a burial place for higher church officials. This building is unique for the northern Caucasus.

== Architecture ==
The church is built from polished sandstone with a use of limestone solution. It has one dome. It is cross-shaped in plan, with an apse from the eastern side.

== Interior ==
In the Senty Church there are many traces of frescoes. This is the biggest mural complex in Alania.

== See also ==
- Shoana Church
- Zelenchuksky Churches
- North Church (Alania)

== Gallery ==
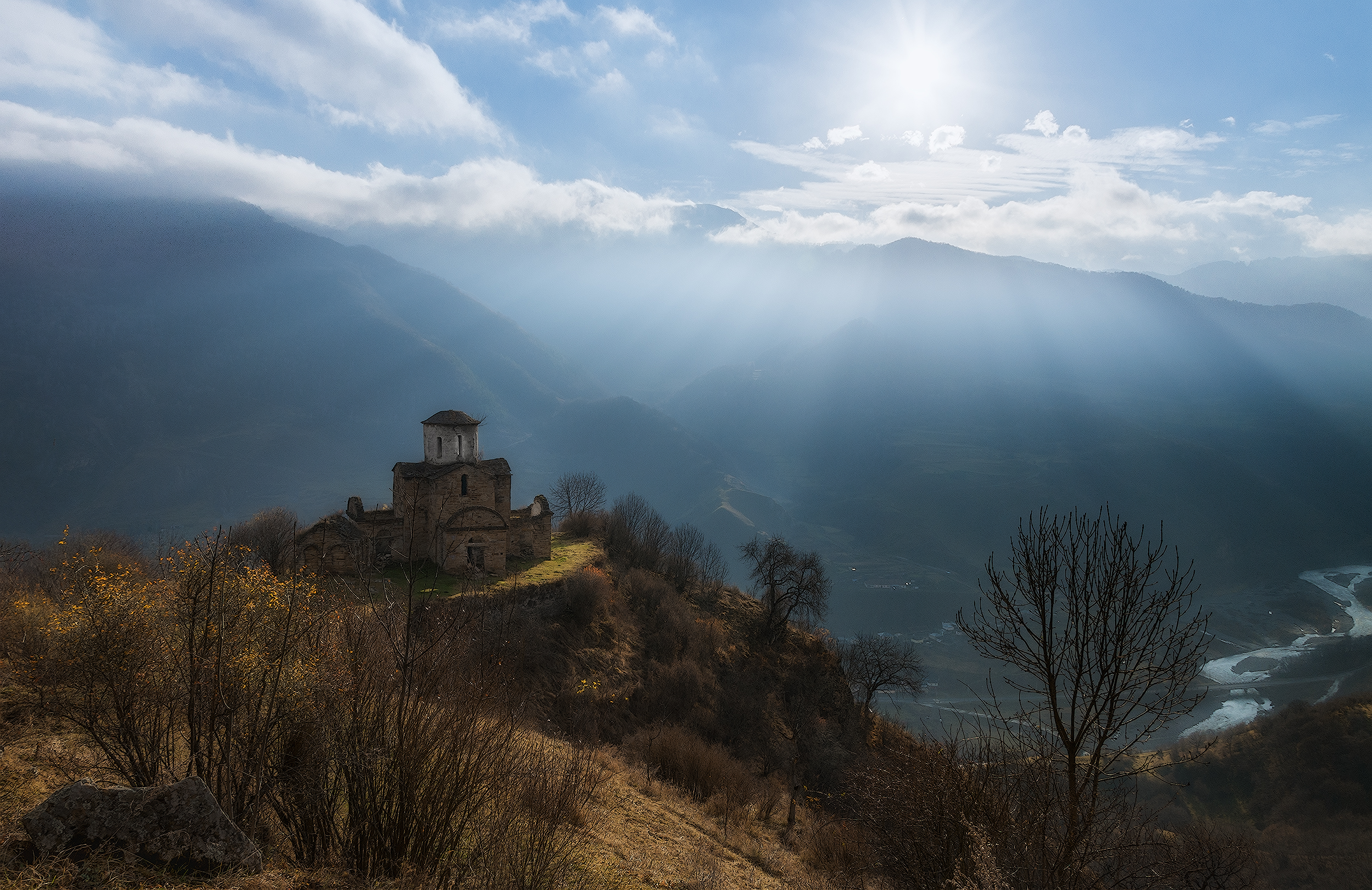

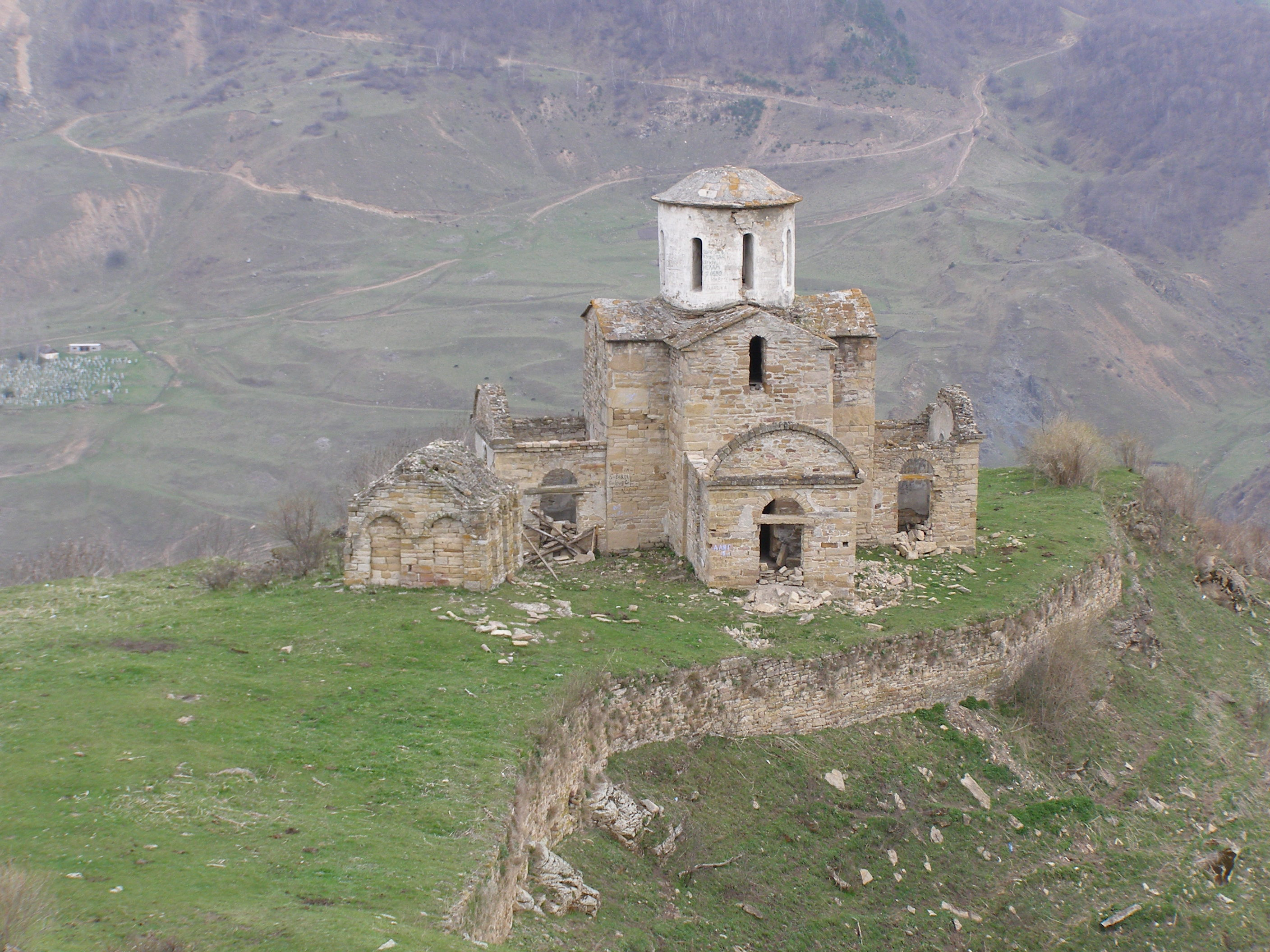
View of Senty Church

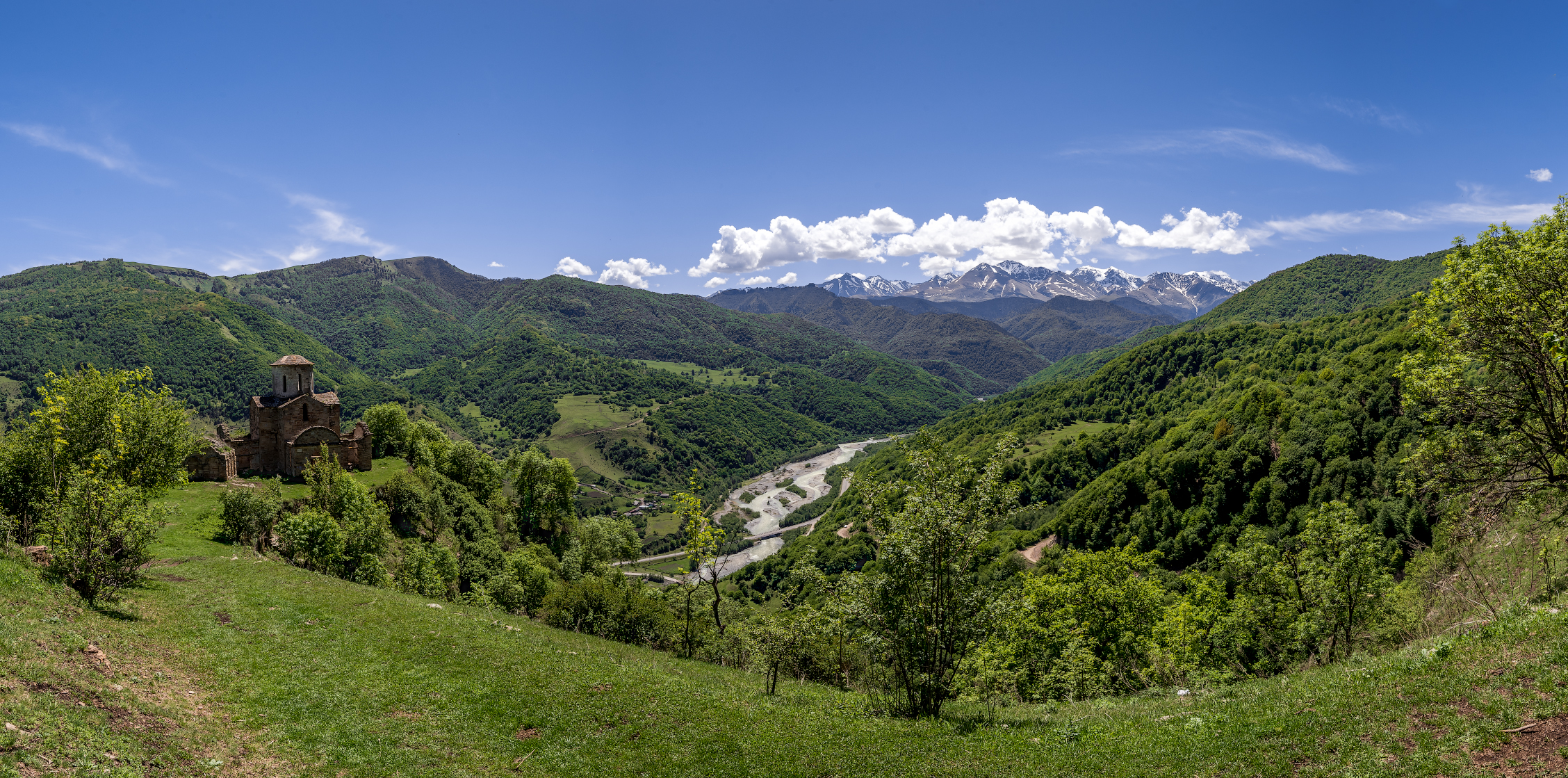
Senty Church

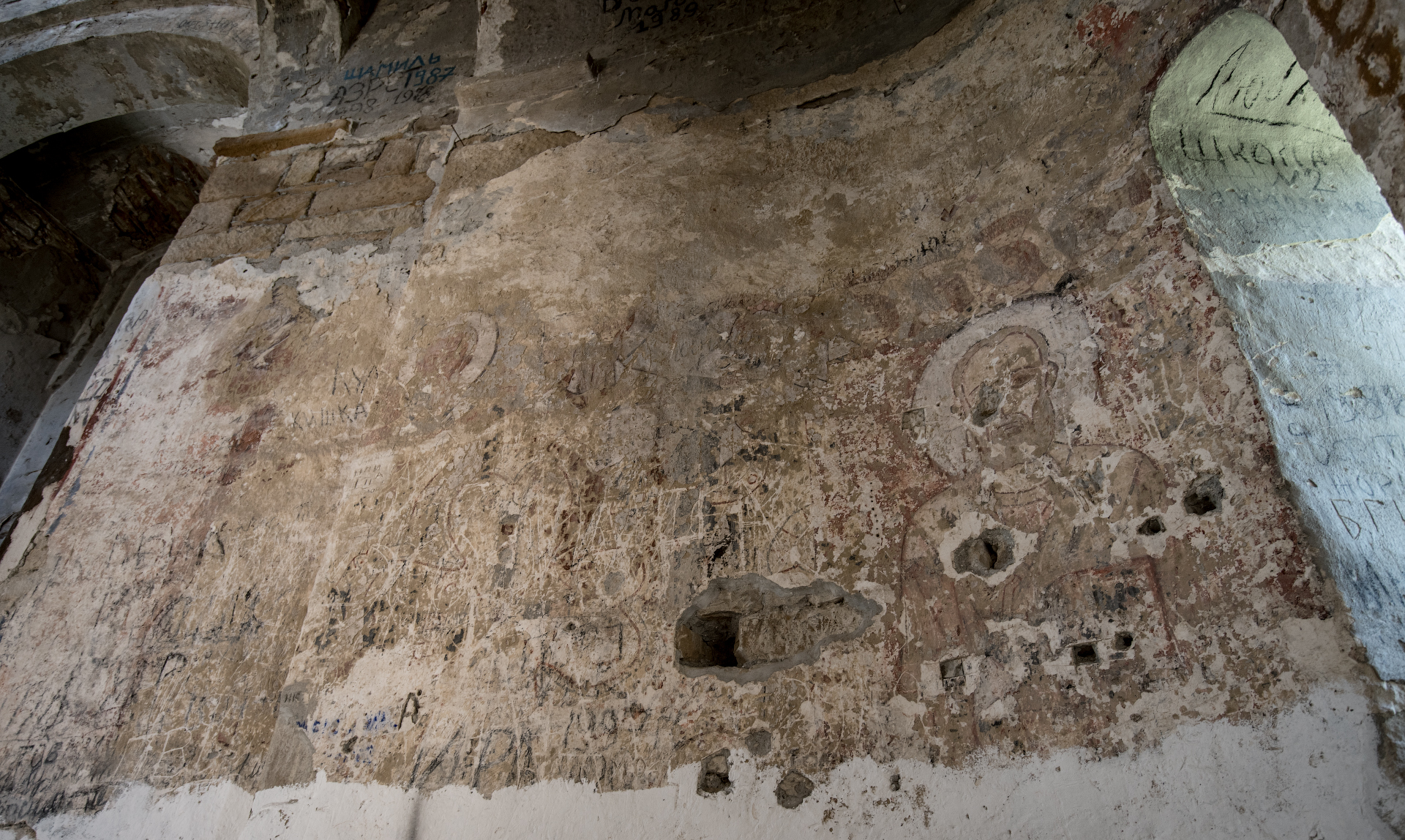
Frescoes of Senty church

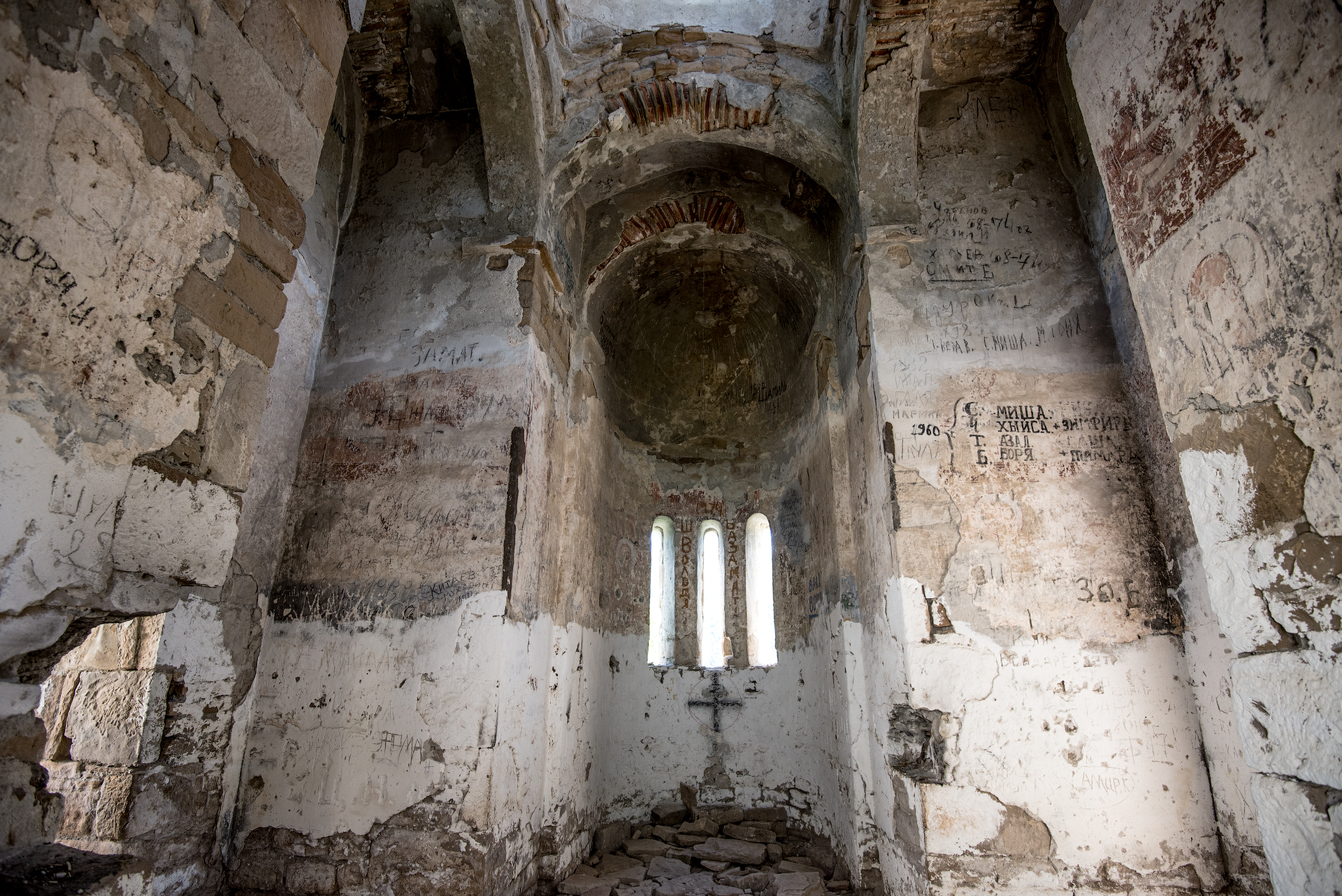
Frescoes of Senty church

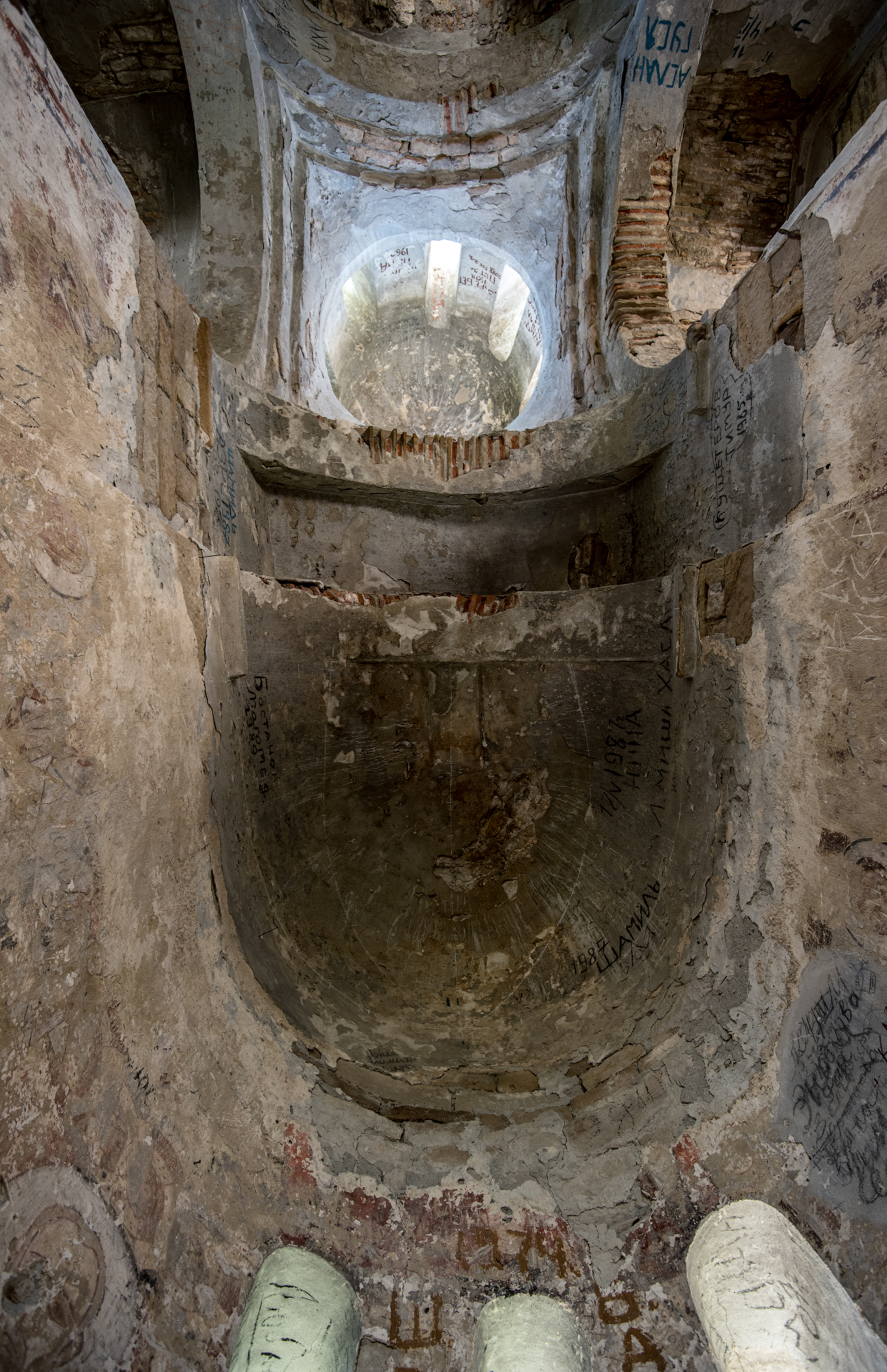
Apse in Senty Church

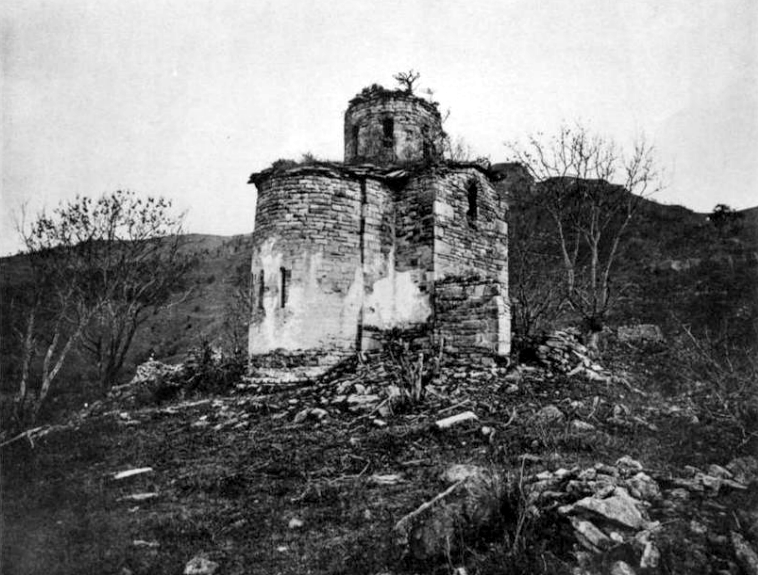
Senty Church in 1895

== References list ==
- Beletskiy D.V., Vinogradov A.U. Freski Sentinskogo khrama i problemy istorii alanskogo khristianstva v X veke (Frescoes of Senty Church and problems of history of alan christianity in Xth century), «Rossijskaja arkheologija», 2005.
- Vinogradov A.U., Beletskiy D.V., Nizhnij Arkhyz i Senty: drevnejshije khramy Rossii. Problemy khristianskogo iskusstva Alanii i Severo-Zapadnogo Kavkaza (Nizhniy Arkhyz and Senty: the most ancient churches in Russia. Problems of christian art of Alania and north-west Caucasus. Moscow, 2011. 392 p.
