= Shoana Church =

Shoana church
- Russian: Шоанинский храм Ossetian: Суаны Уастырджы
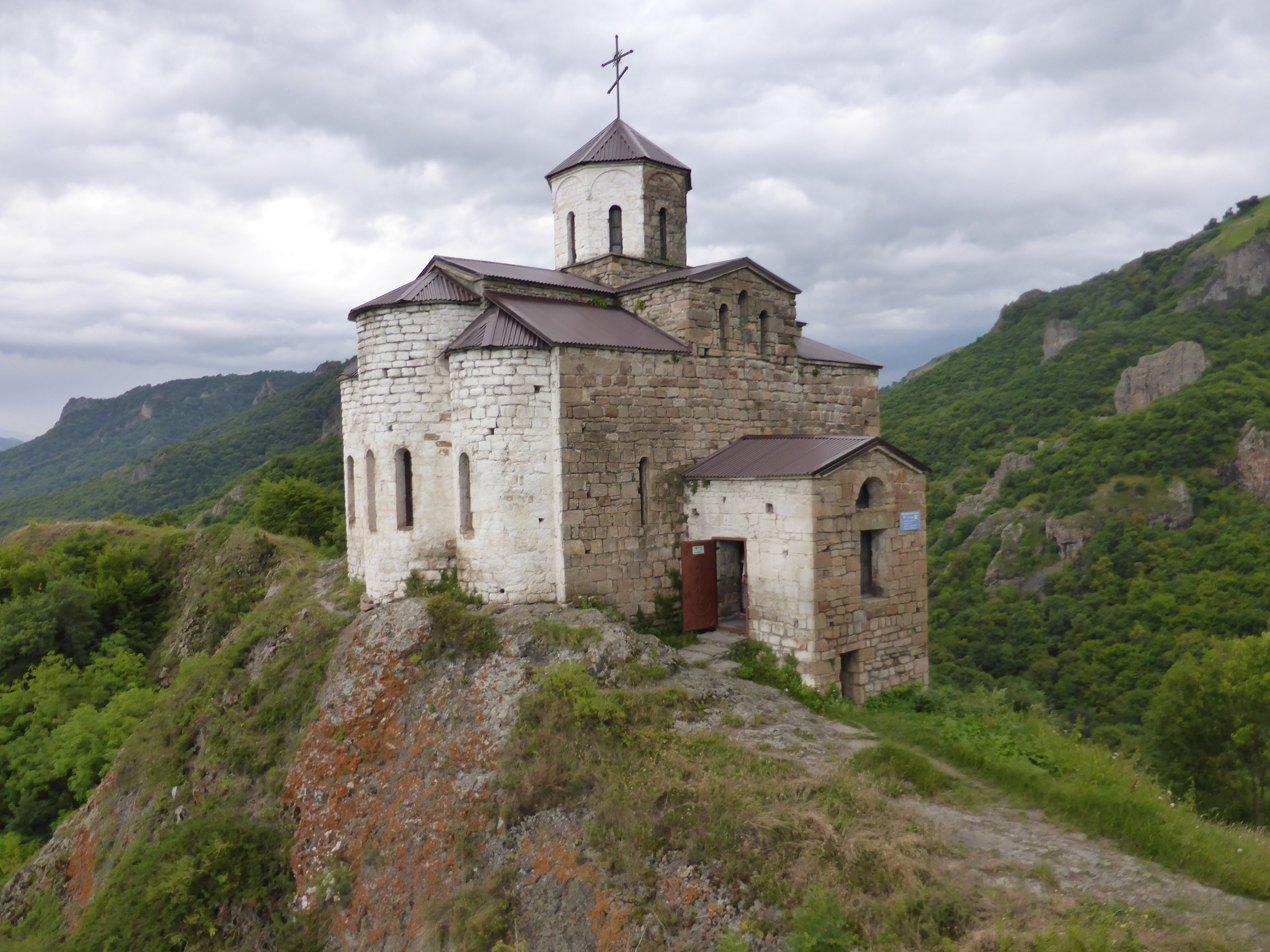
- Location: Karachay-Cherkessia Republic, Russia
- Coordinates: 43°48′16″N 41°53′22″E
- Type: Orthodox church
- Length: 12.9 m
- Width: 8.9 m
- Height: 12.9 m
- Completion date: end of the 10th century

The Shoana church (Russian: Шоанинский храм, Ossetian: Суаны Уастырджы, Уасгергийæ Соани, romanized: Swany Wastyrdži, Wasgergijæ Soani) is a Christian church that belongs to the historical Alanian Diocese. The church was built at the end of the tenth century, and is located on the territory of modern Karachay-Cherkessia Republic, Russia. The building has a crossed-dome plan, with an inscribed cross, which is a variation of the North Zelenchuk Church.

== Location ==
The church is located on the southeastern spur of Mount Shoana, on the left bank of the Kuban River, in a strategically important place not far from confluence of the two rivers: Kuban and Teberda River. The church is located 7 km to the north from the city of Karachayevsk (Russian: Карачаевск), above the Ossetian Kosta Khetagurov village.

== Architecture ==
The church is constructed according to the Byzantine architectural tradition. It has three apses, which are a little bit narrower than naves (of which there are also three). It is a cross-domed building with four square pillars bearing three-stage arches and a cupola. The length of the building from west to east is 12.9 m., The height is equal to the length, the width along the western facade is 8.9 m. The church has two closed vaulted narthexes at the northern and southern end. It is not clear what was the original form of the roof. At the moment, there is a restored gable roof, but there is a theory about the original roof tiles being rested on semi-circular zacomari-gables. The tholobate is octahedral and has eight windows, each side of the tholobate is ended with the archivolt overhang on consoles rested on the corners. Modern tholobate being milti-faced does not rely on any scientific evidence. The plinthite, which is traditional for Georgian and Byzantine buildings, is used only in the arches. The rest of the building is composed of sandstone-with-lime blocks of rough processing, with a butoconcrete filling inside the wall. The windows are crowned not with an arch of plinthite, but with a stone with a semi-circular finish carved in it. Numerous holes for scaffolding are visible in the masonry, and in the hole in the western part of the southern wall there is even a piece of wood that the builders could not remove and just saw it off. For the construction of the church powerful substructions were required. The facade decor of the church is very modest: there is a cornice made of stone tiles, plinthite stones on the drum and stone cornice above some the windows. Outside the church was covered with a thin layer of plastering (can be seen in the voids between some stone tiles), and inside it was plastered and decorated with ornaments.

== History ==
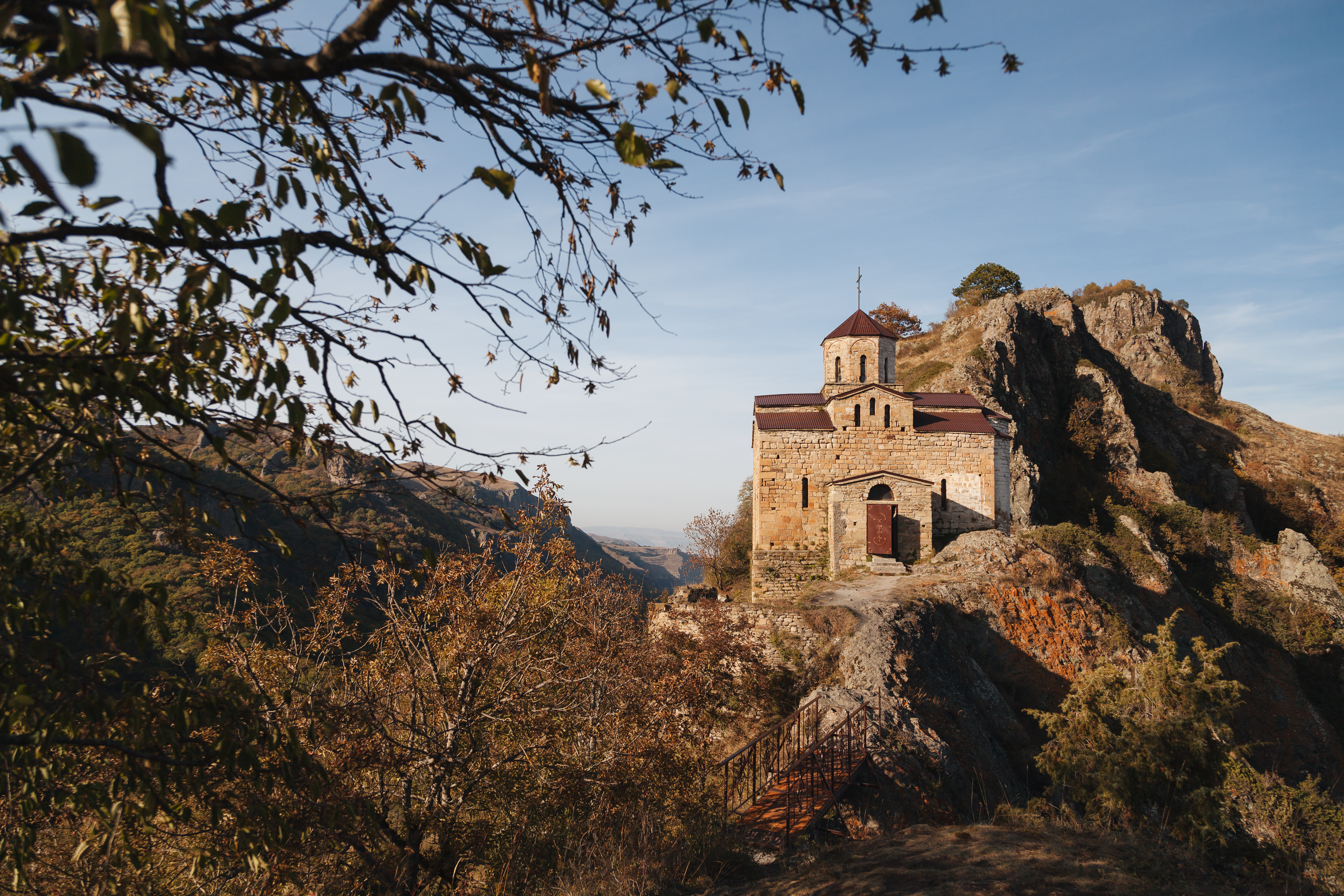
View from the west

The slope, on which the church is located, was previously densely populated, as evidenced by the remains of numerous ancient buildings. Although the original function of the church remains unknown, a large number of burials were found in the settlement, as well as inside the church itself. The Shoana church is essentially a smaller copy of North Zelenchuksky Church (besides Shoana having no narthex and western porch). Indisputable proof of copying is a characteristic combination of the eastern corner cells and the side bema into a single compartiment with one blind arch on the side wall. Russian historians A.Vinogradov and D. Beletsky believe that the church was built by a local builders, who repeated a known pattern, but they were technically better trained than previous builders and could freely interpret the chosen form. It is very difficult to associate the builders with a particular architectural school. There is no written evidence to accurately date the church. Only the picturesque scenery of the church sheds some light on its dating. The remains of the frescoes can be associated with the second layer of the painting in the Senty Church. Therefore, presumably the Shoana church was built in the late 10th – early 11th centuries. Thus, the Shoana church was built after the Central Zelenchuksky Church (950-960s), Senty (965) and North Zelenchuksky (late 960s - 970s) churches; it belongs to the third stage of the temple construction in Alania after returning to Christianity around 950. At the end of the 19th century, Shoana church was turned into the church of the Alexander-Athos monastery. The temple was re-plastered, the roof was replaced, and the chapels were rebuilt.

In 2007 residents of the Kosta Khetagurov village made an unauthorized repair of the church after a series of appeals to the government of the Karachay-Cherkessia Republic. Late plaster in the interior of the church was roughly knocked down, under that plaster was the original plaster was found. As a result, a part of this original coating was lost, and nowadays on the newly discovered parts there are remains of ancient decorative painting. There are also Greek, Arabic, Georgian, Armenian and Russian inscriptions of various eras and numerous North Caucasian ancestral signs - tamga. The eastern part of the church, closest to the village, was whitewashed. On April 30, 2011, unknown people set the temple on fire, but it was quickly eliminated, and the interior and icons were not damaged.

On February 16, 2016 in Russia a silver commemorative coin dedicated to Shoana Church was released.
