= Katranide =

Katranide may refer to:

- Katranide I, queen of Armenia 885–890, wife of Ashot I Mets
- Katranide II, queen of Armenia 990–1020, wife of Gagik I
