= Katranide II =

- Spouse: Gagik I
- Issue: Khushush, Hovhannes-Smbat, Ashot IV, Abbas
- Dynasty: Siunia Dynasty
- Father: Vasak I of Syuni
- Mother: Shahandukht II
- Religion: Armenian Apostolic Church

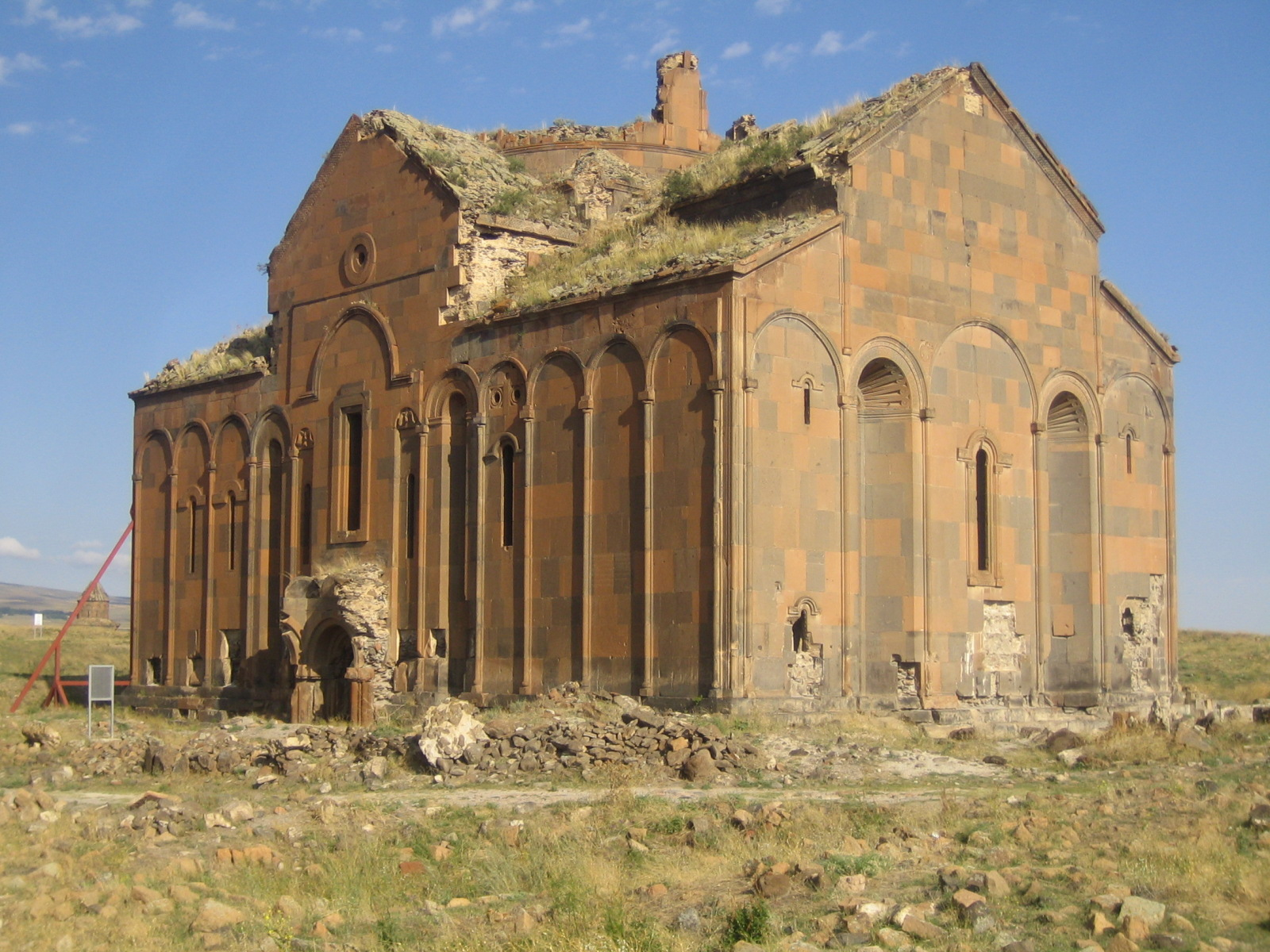
Ruine of the Cathedral of Ani, 40km east of Kars.

Katranide II (c.970-? Armenian: Կատրանիդե Բ) was queen consort of Armenia, wife of King Gagik I of the Bagratid Armenia. She was responsible for the construction of the Cathedral of Ani.

== Life ==
Although her date of birth is unknown and her parentage is unclear, one theory suggests that she was the daughter of King Vasak VI and Queen Shahandukht II of Syunik, granddaughter of king Smbat I of Syunik, an offshoot Armenian kingdom, while another suggests she was the daughter of Gurgen I of Tao.

After her death, Queen Katranide was buried with pomp and church rites in the cemetery of the cemetery next to the Catholic Church of Ani. At the beginning of the 20th century, when a group of archaeologists and orientalist Joseph Orbeli, exhumed the tomb of Katranide and the skeleton of the queen was revealed, they saw that the queen's legs were crossed exactly as the legs of Christ were crucified.

== Legacy ==
She ordered the construction of the Cathedral of Ani, designed by architect Trdat. Under her, among others, the Khtzkonk Monastery (Խծկոնք) with its five churches were either completed or renovated. They have not been standing since the 1960s. Katranide further decorated the Cathedral of Ani with "apricot blossom gold" fabrics, silver and gold vessels. A man-sized silver cross was erected on the dome of the temple, and King Smbat the Cosmonaut brought a giant crystal torch from India.
