= List of kings of Ani =

Chronological list of kings of Ani:

- Abas I of Armenia first king 928/929–953, son of Smbat I (see Bagratuni dynasty) and father of Mouchel, first king of Kars
- Ashot III (son of Abas I) 953–977
- Smbat II (son of Ashot III) 977–989
- Gagik I of Armenia (brother of Smbat II) 989–1020
- Hovhannes-Smbat of Ani (son of Gagik I) 1020–1040/1041
- Ashot IV Qadj (usurper) 1021–1039/1040
- Gargis of Ani (usurper) 1040/1041–1042
- Gagik II (son of Ashot IV) 1042–1045
- To the Byzantine Empire 1045
