= Gagik II of Armenia =

King of Armenia from 1042 to 1045

Gagik II
- King of Armenia; King of Ani
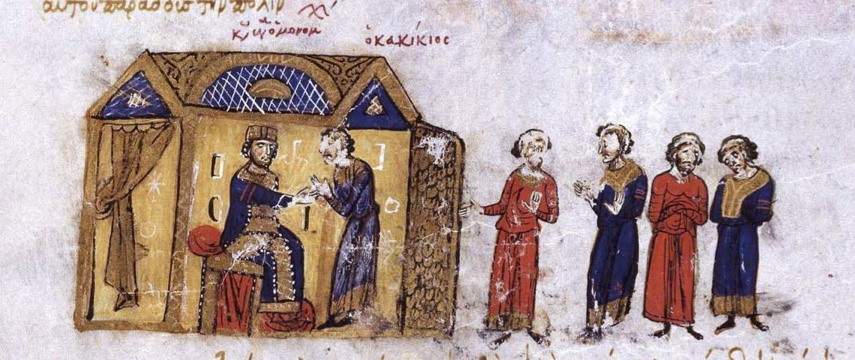
- Gagik submits to Constantine IX Monomachus. Miniature from the Madrid Skylitzes.

King of Armenia
- Reign: 1042–1045
- Predecessor: Hovhannes-Smbat
- Successor: Office abolished Gagik-Abas II of Kars (claimant)
- Born: c. 1025
- Died: May 5/November 24, 1079; Caesarea Mazaca
- Burial: Pizu
- Issue: David; Hovhannes
- Dynasty: Bagratuni
- Father: Ashot IV
- Religion: Armenian Apostolic

Gagik II (Armenian: Գագիկ Բ; c. 1025 - May 5/November 24, 1079) was the last Armenian king of the Bagratuni dynasty, ruling in Ani from 1042 to 1045.

== Biography ==
In Armenology, the activities of Gagik II Bagratuni have been discussed by Mikael Chamchyan, Leon, Manuk Abeghian, Ghevond Alishan, Hrachya Acharyan, Maghakia Ormanyan, and others. Among Armenian chroniclers, he was mentioned by Aristakes Lastivertsi, Grigor Magistros, Samvel Anetsi, Vardan Areveltsi, Mkhitar Ayrivanetsi, Matthew Urkhaetsi, Kirakos Gandzaketsi, Smbat Sparapet, and others, while among Byzantine historians, he was mentioned by Hovhannes Skylitzes and Michael Attaleiates. Gagik II was born around 1024. The 12th-century chronicler Matthew Urkhaetsi describes Gagik II as a wise and God-fearing youth. Manuk Abeghian notes that there was a library at the court of Ani. The same was true at the Catholicosate. Gagik II is also known as a scholar and sage. Historiography contains conflicting accounts of his marriage. According to Matthew Urkhaetsi, his family was brought from Ani to Byzantium; according to Aristakes Lastivertsi, he married the daughter of David, son of Sennacherib, at the emperor's request; and according to M. Ormanyan, he married David's widow to inherit his estate. Gagik II was an educated and wise king. Kirakos Gandzaketsi wrote of the king:

"But since he had been studying books since childhood, he also enjoyed them."

Matthew Urkhaetsi wrote:

...And Gagik was a man of genius and wisdom."

Other authors also wrote about the king's wisdom:

"...In those days lived the wise Gagik, son of Abas Kartsi." “A man who loved wisdom and was filled with all understanding, and knowledgeable in the Old and New Testaments”.

== The Period Before the Accession of Gagik II ==
In 1020, the Armenian King Gagik I died. Although his eldest son, Hovhannes-Smbat, was expected to inherit the throne by right of seniority, a serious struggle for the throne arose between him and his brother, Ashot IV. Through the mediation of Vahram Pahlavuni, Catholicos Petros Getadardz, and the Georgian king, a peace was concluded under which the capital, Ani, and its surroundings were transferred to Hovhannes-Smbat, and the remainder to Ashot IV. One of the conditions of the peace was that upon the death of Hovhannes-Smbat, the Armenian throne would pass entirely to Ashot IV, or, if he also died, to his son. However, this peace, established in the country, was short-lived. In 1022, Georgian-Byzantine negotiations began in Trebizond, in which Catholicos Petros Getadardz also participated. During the negotiations, Byzantine Emperor Basil II (Barsegh) demanded that the Catholicos hand over the Kingdom of Ani. Under pressure from the pro-Byzantine Catholicos, Hovhannes-Smbat agreed. As a result, this humiliating testament was sent to Basil II. This fact became known to the people of Ani, and when the Catholicos returned to his homeland, they rebelled against him. He was imprisoned until 1037, but was later released. In 1041, first Ashot IV died, then Hovhannes-Smbat. Following these events, Emperor Michael IV sent an army to capture the Kingdom of Ani in accordance with the testament. Vahram Pahlavuni, leading an army of approximately 30,000 men, managed to repel the enemy onslaught. In the context of the aforementioned events, the pro-Byzantine faction came to the fore. Among these nobles was Sargis Syunetsi, who received the Byzantine title of "vest" and is known in history as Vest Sargis. He confiscated the royal treasures, which aroused the hatred of the population. As a result, on the initiative of Vahram Pahlavuni, the son of Ashot V the Brave, eighteen-year-old Gagik, Gagik II (1041-1044), was proclaimed king of the Kingdom of Ani. He was a well-educated and noble youth, but his shortcoming lay precisely in this nobility, which later had its fatal consequences. According to Karen Matevosyan, the crown prince was Grigor Bjnetsi. The central Kingdom of Ani attempted to rise to its feet during this short period, but as a result of the external conquests of the Byzantine Empire, it suffered a different fate. During the imperial army's final attack on Ani, Abu'l-Aswar Shawir, who ruled in Dvin, also took a hostile stance, resulting in the army of the Kingdom of Ani, led by King Gagik II, invading the outskirts of Dvin in mid-August 1041 and retreating. It is noteworthy that in these final events, although to a lesser extent, Abu'l-Aswar Shawir this time also drew the Seljuk Sultanate into the conflict, whose army, leaving Dvin aside, attempted to penetrate deeper into the territory of the Kingdom of Ani. However, at the end of August 1041, in the Battle of Bini Fortress, the army of the Kingdom of Ani (approximately 10,000 men), under the command of Vasak Pahlavuni's son, Grigor Magister Pahlavuni, defeated the army of the Seljuk Sultanate (approximately 20,000 men) that had invaded the territory of the Kingdom of Ani and captured its commander. In early September 1041, the army of the Kingdom of Lori (approximately 10,000 men), commanded by David I Anhoghin, who sought to be proclaimed king of the Kingdom of Ani, again raided the outskirts of Ani and retreated, but to no avail. Thus, the Armenians, having armed themselves, preserved the integrity and sovereignty of their kingdom, but even greater difficulties lay ahead. Matthew Urkhaetsi testifies: "At that time, an eighteen-year-old youth named Gagik of the Bagratuni dynasty appeared, the son of King Ashot, the son of Gagik, the son of Ashot, the son of Abbas, the son of Smbat, the son of Yerkat. The youth Gagik was very wise, pious, and God-fearing."

In 1042, the 18-year-old Gagik II Bagratuni was solemnly crowned king of Armenia by Catholicos Peter Getadardz in Ani.

Grigor Bjnetsi placed the crown on the head of Gagik II Bagratuni.

"By crowning Gagik, they attempted to prevent the fall of the Bagratuni kingdom in Ani, with Vahram Pahlavun as the powerful patriarch and the learned Grigorius as the ideological and ceremonial participant."

== The Fall of the Bagratid Kingdom ==
In 1042, Constantine Monomachos became Emperor of Byzantium. He finally decided to resolve the existing problem: seizing the Kingdom of Ani. He approached Gagik II, as his heir, and demanded that he hand over the kingdom. Gagik II recognized his enemy's military advantage and attempted diplomacy. The situation changed dramatically in 1044, when the emperor decided to put an end to the Armenian Kingdom and sent a large army led by Michael Iasites. However, the Armenians were not prepared to surrender so easily, and as a result, in April 1044, at the Battle of Ani, Vostanik's army (approximately 40,000 men), under the command of commander Vahram Pahlavuni, routed the advancing Byzantine army (approximately 70,000 men) and its Armenian warriors (approximately 15,000 men). The Armenians achieved another victory over the advancing imperial army at the walls of Ani in May 1044, and then another in June. The emperor then sent his chamberlain, Nicholas. In a fierce battle at the gates of Ani, the Armenian forces, under the command of Vahram Pahlavuni and Gagik II, achieved a brilliant victory.

The emperor also approached the emir of Dvin, Abu'l-Asvar Shavir, inviting him to invade the kingdom of Ani. The emperor promised to grant him any territories the emir could conquer by force of arms. In June 1044, an army under Abu'l-Asvar Shavir captured Surmaru (Ayrarat, north of Masyatsotn Province, on the right bank of the Araks), Amberd (Ayrarat, west of Aragatsotn Province, on the southern slope of the Aragats), and the fortress of Khor Virap from the army of the Kingdom of Ani (numbering approximately 1,000). In July 1044, the imperial army again attacked in the direction of Ani. However, under the walls of Ani, the provincial army under General Vahram Pahlavuni (numbering approximately 30,000) routed the Byzantine army (numbering approximately 55,000) and the Armenian warriors (numbering approximately 10,000), who had besieged the city with a surprise attack. After suffering a final military defeat, Constantinople decided to pursue diplomatic action regarding the Ani issue. As a result, using the entire arsenal of diplomatic guarantees of the time, a message was composed and sent to Gagik II, inviting the latter, so to speak, to Constantinople for a final clarification of relations. Gagik II, apparently, even made a deliberate mistake by not listening to the experienced general Vahram Pahlavuni and giving in to the claims of the courtier Vest Sargis, who had long ago betrayed his king, as well as the claims of the most unsuccessful Armenian Catholicos of all time, Peter I Getadardz (1019-1058). Hoping to finally establish peace, Gagik II decided to set out for Constantinople. In the imperial capital, the Armenian king was initially greeted with great honors, and Monomakh himself honored him for several days, hosting a royal feast.Vahram Pahlavi and the other freedmen who had placed Gagik on the throne advised him against going to Constantinople, but Gagik, with the faintest hope of ending the war peacefully and saving Armenian statehood, after much hesitation, went to the emperor. The outcome exceeded all expectations, as after King Gagik II's departure for Constantinople, he was captured there and never returned to Ani.

Before the king's departure, Vest Sarkis and Catholicos Peter Getadardz sent the emperor the keys to the capital, Ani. Constantine Monomachos summoned Gagik and handed him the keys and a letter. Seeing this, the Armenian king, as quoted by Matvey Urgaetsky, sighed and said:

"I am the lord and king of the Armenian land; I do not give you Armenia, because you brought me to Constantinople by deception."

He remained adamant for a month, but finally, finding no way out, he agreed to hand over Ani to the empire. In exchange, Monomakh, forbidding Gagik from returning to Ani, handed over to him the cities of Kalon Pelat and Pisa in Cappadocia as estates, ordering the royal family to be transported to Byzantium. Gagik received extensive holdings in Asia Minor, as well as a palace in Constantinople. In turn, under the difficult circumstances created, the traitors who had gathered in Ani itself managed to isolate the uncompromising supporter of the struggle and defender of independence, Vahram Sparapet, deprive him of the support of his allies and, having established contact with the enemy, in early 1045 surrendered Ani, and consequently the entire kingdom, to the Byzantine Empire. The kingdom of Ani, which had pan-Armenian significance, was destroyed. This had tragic consequences for the Armenian people: the statehood of Armenia itself was destroyed for many centuries.

== Further Actions and the Assassination of Gagik II ==
In 1045, the Byzantine army again advanced on the Armenian capital, Ani. This time, the inhabitants of Ani offered no resistance to the Byzantine army. The cunning Byzantine elite weakened the popular forces and easily captured Ani. This effectively ended Armenian statehood in the country itself, as the remaining kingdoms of Kars, Lori, and Syunik were of local significance and did not seek to restore pan-Armenian statehood.

In 1045, Gagik II surrendered to the emperor. In exchange for Ani and the surrounding provinces, according to foreign sources, Gagik II was granted the title of magister, a pension, a palace in Constantinople, and lands in Cappadocia, Garsyan, Lycanton, and Kalonpagat, as well as the small city of Pisa. According to Armenian sources, he was given Havartanek, Pisa, Kalonpagat, Caesarea, and Tsamndav.The main reason for the decline of the Bagratid Kingdom was the country's political fragmentation. The deepening of feudal relations and the accumulation of enormous material resources and human power among individual feudal lords allowed them to bypass the central government and act as supreme rulers.

In 1045, Gagik II, deprived of his kingdom due to the intrigues of the Byzantine Empire, arrived and settled in the city of Pisa, located on the border of Cilicia. This circumstance led to a mass exodus of Armenian nobility from various regions of Armenia, as well as other segments of the population, to the southern regions of Cappadocia and the northern regions of Cilicia.

There is no information about Gagik II's activities from 1045 to 1065. In the summer of 1066, the army of Gagik of 1000 man, the former king of the Kingdom of Ani, invaded Cappadocia. In August of the same year, 1066, a combined army of the Seljuk Sultanate (approximately 1,000 men) and Armenia (300 men) invaded the outskirts of the fortresses of Melite and Hisn Calaudia and retreated. Gagik's testimony about Metropolitan Mark of Caesarea has been preserved. According to this testimony, in Greece, the latter showed extreme disrespect for the Armenian people and called dogs Armen. Arriving in Caesarea, Gagik expressed a desire to stay with the Metropolitan. Metropolitan Mark received him. Gagik II ordered his bodyguards to throw the dog into a sack. The king's bodyguards also threw Mark into a sack, tied his mouth, and began beating the dog, which, enraged by pain, tore its master to pieces. This behavior toward the Greeks did not go unpunished, becoming a pretext for revenge. In the spring of 1079, Gagik lead his man to invad northern Cilicia and Cappadocia. Numerous accounts of Gagik II's murder have survived.

Matthew Urhaetsi places Gagik's murder in 1079, while Samvel Anetsi's chronology places it in 1080.

Matthew Urhaetsi testifies that in 1079, Gagik II set out with his army to the Arzhakas plain, to the fortress of Kizistra, which belonged to three Greek princes, the Mandalas brothers. Gagik, riding ahead of his soldiers on horseback, accompanied by three men, approached his brothers, who had come to meet him and had set up an ambush. They approached Gagik, bowed, and as they approached to greet him, all three suddenly seized the king by the neck and threw him down. The soldiers in ambush jumped out, and Gagik's comrades fled, reporting the news to his army. Upon receiving the news, they dispersed, leaving the king alone. The brothers took him to their fortress. Eight days later, many Armenian princes in Byzantium advanced on the fortress of Cyzistra, but were defeated due to its impregnability. The Greeks strangled the last descendant of the Bagratid dynasty, Gagik II, with a bowstring and hung his body from the wall for a day, then buried it outside. The king's relatives took his body to Pisa at night and buried him in a monastery. Gagik's death was later avenged by Prince Thoros of the Rubenid dynasty, who killed his three brothers and restored the crown and other royal possessions to Gagik.

Malakiya Ormanyan wrote of Gagik II:

"While Gagik was alive, he was a terror and a menace to those around him, and only thanks to his ferocious strength and courage was he able to live independently within the Greek borders until he was killed by the vengeful hostility of the Greeks."

According to Matthew Urkhaetsi, Gagik's eldest son was Hovhannes:

"And on that day, the kingdom ceased to belong to the House of Armenians and the Bagratun people." As for the kingdom, until 1065, 20 years after the fall of Ani, the Bagratun political organization, the "Armenian House," still existed, and it was headed by the last two representatives of the Bagratun branch of Kars. The rights of shahshah and the seniority of the dynasty passed to them, and by this right they headed the "Armenian House".

Royal enthronement scene from the frontispiece of a gospel commissioned by Gagik-Abas, ruler of Kars circa 1050.

== Years in exile ==
Gagik received as compensation for his kingdom the district of Lycandus in Asia Minor as well as the lands in Tzamandos, Larissa, Amaseia and Comana in the vicinity of Caesarea in 1064. it was in Tzamandos that the new catholicos Gregory II the Martyrophile was consecrated in 1065. Gagik was also granted the use of a palace on the Bosphorus in Constantinople and a pension from the imperial treasury. Several seals testify "Kakikios Aniotes" (Gagik of Ani) as duke of the thema of Charsianon. During his time in exile, according to Matthew of Edessa, Gagik also took part in a theological debate between him and the Byzantine emperor in Constantinople, defending the Armenian Church and its tradition and rites.

The Metropolitan of Caesarea named Markos was said to regularly express his scorn torwards Gagik through insults against him. Gagik eventually murdered the bishop, which made him even more unpopular among the locals. The Bishop had a dog named Armen, so as to scorn the Armenians. One day, Gagik visited the bishop, had the dog put inside a canvas bag and beat with sticks. He then had the Bishop seized and placed in the same bag with the dog, now maddened by pain. The bishop died in pain from the wounds inflicted by his own dog. After this incident, he proceeded to loot the home of Markos, gathering gold, silver, 6,000 sheep, 40 yoked buffalo and 20 pairs of oxen from his estate. He and his men were also said to have violated the noblewomen of Caesarea and sparked unrest within the city. Gagik was captured and later killed on May 5 or November 24 of the year 1079, by the local Byzantine governors, the three brothers of Kyzistra, who had his body mutilated and hanged from a fort for others to see. His body was later buried outside the fort but was later said to have been secretly conveyed by an Armenian from Ani named Banik to a convent he had built in a city called Pizu.

== Gagik II's "Book of Faith" ==
The only work by King Gagik that has survived to this day is the Chronicle of Matthew of Urkhaeti. It is constructed using the rhetorical device of address. His speech of faith and confession is interrupted by an address to the emperor, sometimes directing his speech. Maghakiya Ormanyan notes of the work:

"The letter is addressed to the emperor and first speaks of the Trinity, the creation of the world, and the Holy Spirit. Speaking of the incarnation, it mentions and refutes the teachings of Vagintian, Marcion, Montanus, Mani, Navatius, Sabellius, Arius, Votinus, Nestorius, Eutychius, Sarkis the Armenian, Paul of Samosata, and Peter of Knapet."

Gagik II Bagratuni, the last king of the Bagratuni Armenian Kingdom of Ani, was not only a statesman and political figure who fought to preserve the state on the brink of collapse and paved the way for the founding of the Armenian Kingdom of Cilicia, but also a spiritual and cultural figure who, with his work "The Book of Faith," defended the faith of the Armenian Church from Hellenistic influences. Moreover, with this work, he sanctioned the abolition of the election of the Catholicos of Armenia, an act of historical significance. King Gagik's only written work is doctrinal and constructed with rhetorical ploys.

"The last and unfortunate Bagratuni king will personally write a letter of faith and present it to Emperor Constantine and Patriarch John VIII (1064-1075)."

== Literature ==
1. Մատթէոս Ուռհայեցի, Ժամանակագրութիւն, Վաղարշապատ, 1898։
2. Կիրակոս Գանձակեցի, Հայոց պատմություն, Երևան, 1982։
3. Սմբատայ Սպարապետի Տարեգիրք, Վենետիկ, 1956։
4. Վանո Եղիազարյան, Գագիկ Բ Բագրատունին և նրա «Հավատոյ գիր»-ը, Երևան, 2020։
5. Կ. Մաթևոսյան, Անիի ազնվականության պատմությունից կամ երեք Գրիգոր Մագիստրոս,Երևան, 2015։
6. Дэвид Ленг, Армяне народ - созидатель, Москва , 2007։
7. Լեո, Երկերի ժողովածու, հ. Բ., Երևան, 1967:
8. Արիստակիսի Լաստիվերտցւոյ Պատմութիւն։
9. Հայ ժողովրդի պատմություն, Երևան, 1975։
10. Մ. Օրմանեան, Ազգապատում։
11. Ռ. Մաթևոսյան, Բագրատունյաց Հայաստանի պետական կառուցվածքն ու վարչական կարգը, Երևան, 1990։
12. Մ. Գրիգորյան, Գագիկ Արծրունի և Գագիկ Բագրատունի թագավորների թղթերը բյուզանդական արքունիքին, Պատմա-բանասիրական հանդես, 1989:
13. Բագրատունյաց թագավորության անկումը, Հ․ Բարթիկյան, Երևան, 1976։

Vacant Title last held by Hovhannes-Smbat as King of Ani	King of Bagratid Armenia	Byzantine annexation of Armenia
Vacant Title last held by Ashot IV as King in other provinces	King of Bagratid Armenia	Byzantine annexation of Armenia
