= Hovhannes-Smbat III of Armenia =

King of Armenia from 1020 to 1040

Hovhannes-Smbat III Հովհաննես-Սմբատ Գ
- King of Armenia; King of Ani
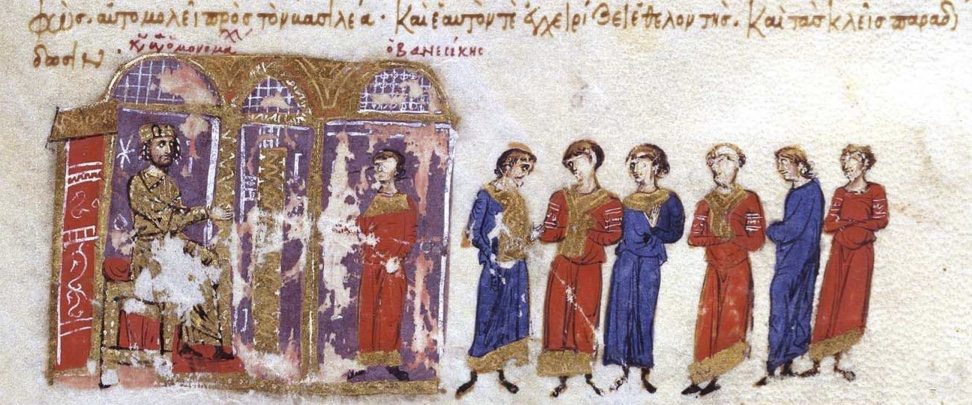
- Hovhannes submits to Basil II, miniature from the Madrid Skylitzes

King of Ani
- Predecessor: Gagik I
- Successor: Gagik II
- Dynasty: Bagratuni
- Father: Gagik I
- Mother: Katranide

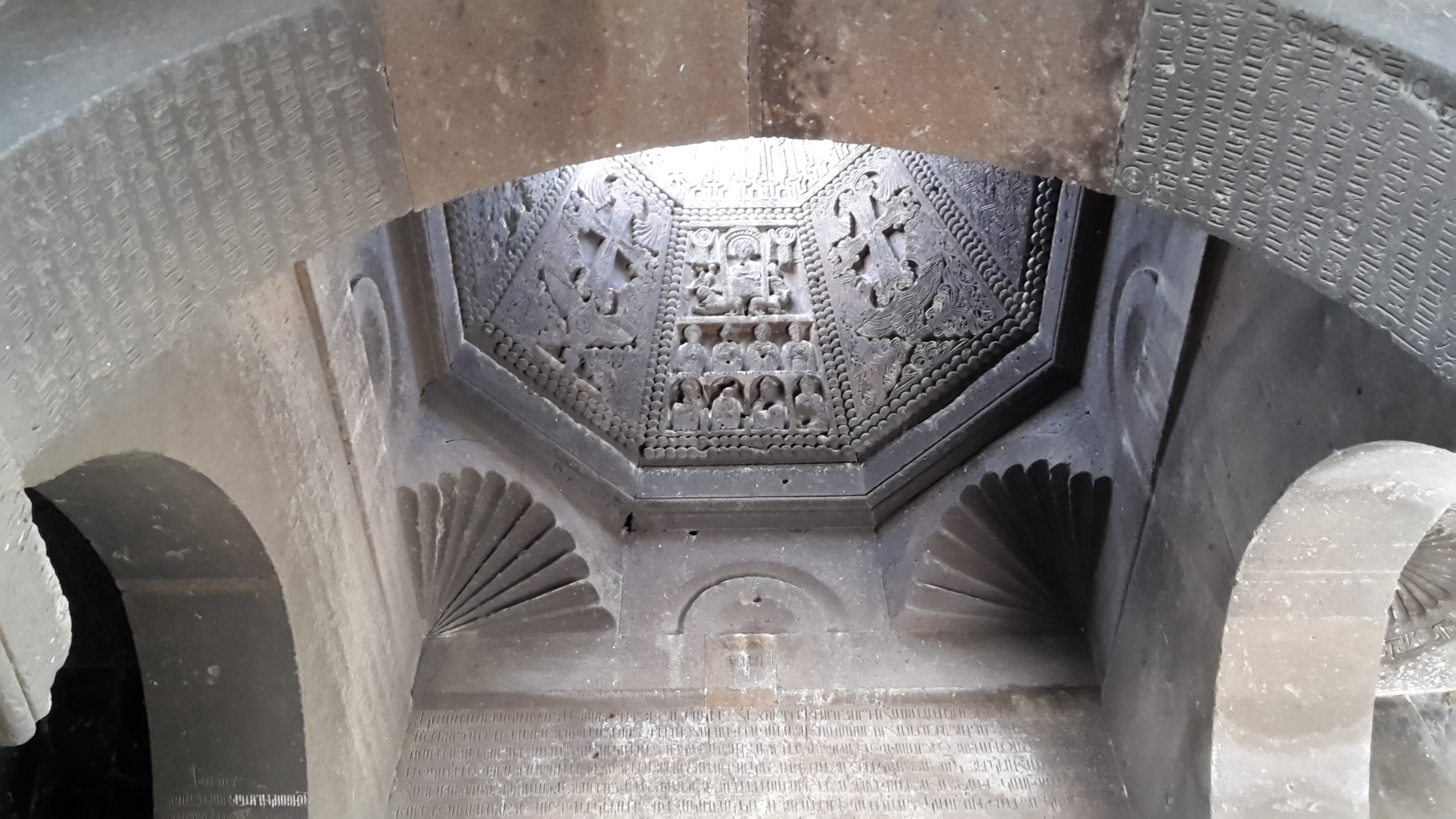
Hovhannes-Smbat built and dedicated the Saint John church and zhamatun of Horomos Monastery in 1038.

Hovhannes-Smbat III (Armenian: Հովհաննես-Սմբատ Գ, romanized: Hovhannes-Smbat G) was King of Ani (1020–1040). He succeeded his father Gagik I of Ani (989–1020) being the king's elder son and legal heir to the throne.

== Life ==
His enthronement in 1020 was strongly opposed by his younger brother Ashot, who one year later in 1021 rebelled against him, driving his forces to Ani the capital, surrounding and conquering the city and dethroning his brother Hovhannes-Smbat III in 1021 and usurping power from him.

But following a compromise agreement between the two feuding brothers, he agreed to withdraw his rebel forces from Ani and let the legal heir Hovhannes-Smbat III to return to power continuing as Hovhannes-Smbat III of Ani on limited areas around the capital, whereas Ashot (known as Ashot IV) would be enthroned a concurrent king and rule in further Armenian provinces closer to Persia and Georgia. Despite the agreed compromise, conflicts, sometimes military, continued between the two brother kings thus greatly weakening the Armenian Bagratid kingdom. In the winter of 1021/2 Hovhannes-Smbat was compelled to make the Byzantine emperor Basil II his heir, an arrangement imposed on him on account of the Armenian support to King George I of Georgia in the Georgian-Byzantine war. Hovhannes-Smbat's heritage eventually passed to the Byzantine Empire in 1042, long after Basil had died.

Preceded by Gagik I	King of Armenia (Bagratid Kingdom of Armenia) as King of Ani; 1020–1040 concurrently with Ashot IV (King in other provinces) (1021-1039)	Succeeded by Gagik II
