= Gagik I of Armenia =

King of Armenia from 989 to 1020

Gagik I Գագիկ Ա
- Shahanshah of Armenians, Georgians and Albanians; King of Armenia; King of Ani
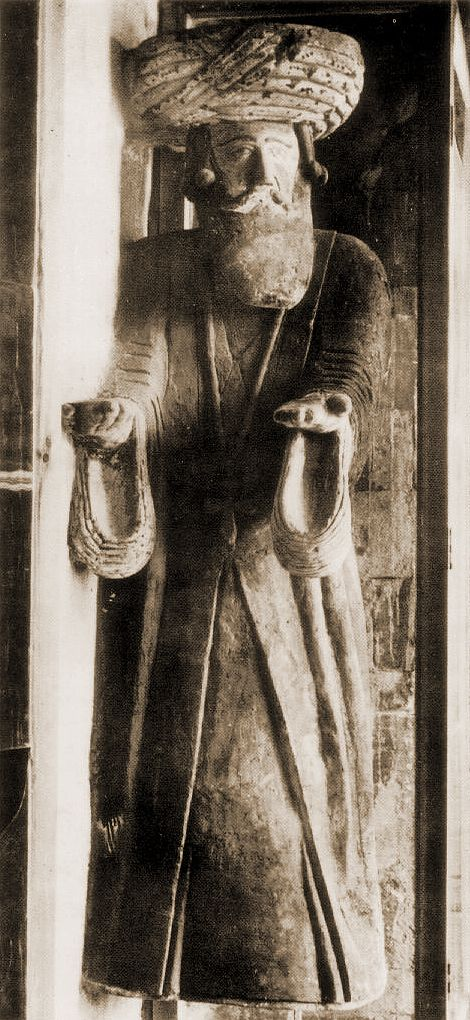
- Statue of Gagik I found in Ani

King of Armenia
- Reign: 989–1017/20
- Predecessor: Smbat II
- Successor: Hovhannes-Smbat; Ashot IV
- Burial: Ani or Horomos
- Spouse: Katranide
- Issue: Hovhannes-Smbat III; Ashot IV; Khushush
Names
- Gagik I Bagratuni
- Dynasty: Bagratuni
- Father: Ashot III
- Mother: Khosrovanuysh
- Religion: Armenian Apostolic

Gagik I (Armenian: Գագիկ Ա) was a Bagratid king of Armenia who reigned between 989 and 1020, under whom Bagratid Armenia reached its height and enjoyed a period of uninterrupted peace and prosperity. He was the second son of the Armenian King Ashot III the Merciful and Queen Khosrovanuysh, the younger brother of Smbat II of Armenia, and the older brother of King Gurgen I of Lori (Tashir-Dzoraget). The years of Gagik's reign are considered the "Golden Age" of medieval Armenia.

== Background and family ==
In the first year of Gagik's reign, at the end of the 10th century, the emir of Atropatene (Atrpatakan), Mamlan, allied with neighboring Arab emirs, campaigned against David Kuropalates and Gagik I, entered the Tsaghkotn canton, and camped in the village of Kosteank. The allied forces of Gagik I, King Abas of Kars, David Kuropalates, and King Bagrat repelled the enemy. Gagik I Bagratuni (reigned 989–1020) belonged to the Armenian royal Bagratuni dynasty that ruled from the 9th to the 11th centuries. The Bagratunis were one of the most influential nakharar (noble) families of Armenia, who restored Armenian statehood in 885 with the coronation of Ashot I Bagratuni.

Gagik was the son of the Armenian King Ashot III the Merciful (953–977). During the reign of Ashot III, Ani was proclaimed the capital of Armenia, and defensive fortifications, churches, and public buildings were constructed, which contributed to the political and economic strengthening of the country. Growing up in these favorable conditions, Gagik became acquainted with the principles of state administration, military organization, and diplomatic relations from an early age. Gagik's brother was Smbat II the Master of the Universe (977–989), who inherited the throne after their father's death. During Smbat II's reign, Gagik held an important position in the political and military life of the kingdom. Gagik governed a number of provinces and participated in the defense and administration of the country, gaining significant experience in state governance. Smbat II had no heir, and after his death in 989, the Armenian nobility and the ecclesiastical elite recognized Gagik as the King of Armenia.

Information regarding Gagik's family in medieval primary sources is limited. It is known that his wife was Queen Katramide, who was famous for her philanthropy and church-building activities. Under her initiative and patronage, several ecclesiastical structures were built or renovated. Katramide's name is particularly mentioned in the inscriptions associated with the Cathedral of Ani, which testifies to her important role in the spiritual and cultural activities of the royal family. Gagik I had two sons, Hovhannes-Smbat and Ashot IV, who later became Kings of Armenia.

However, the dynastic disputes that arose between them after Gagik's death significantly weakened the Bagratuni kingdom and contributed to the political fragmentation of the country. His family not only continued the royal lineage of the Bagratunis but also played a crucial role in the subsequent political developments of 11th-century Armenia. Gagik I based his power on both hereditary rights and the support of the nakharar nobility and the Armenian Apostolic Church. This circumstance greatly contributed to the stability of his rule and allowed him to maintain the internal harmony and external political balance of the country for many years.

== Reign ==
Gagik I Bagratuni (989–1020) ascended the throne in 989, after the death of his brother Smbat II Bagratuni. The initial years of his reign coincided with a difficult period for the country, as Armenia was still struggling against external threats and internal political instability at that time. Despite this, Gagik managed to restore the authority of the royal power and gradually strengthen the Bagratuni kingdom. In the first years of his reign, he pursued a flexible foreign policy, trying to balance relations with the Byzantine Empire and the Arab Caliphate. Thanks to his diplomatic policy, Armenia maintained its independence and avoided major devastating wars. During Gagik's rule, the royal power was significantly consolidated. He established control over many of the country's principalities, contributing to the formation of a centralized administration. The king also supported the country's economic development, trade, and the growth of cities. During the years of his rule, Bagratid Armenia reached the peak of its political and economic rise. Gagik I also paid special attention to the development of culture and the church, sponsored the construction of churches and monasteries, and promoted the strengthening of Christian values. The long and successful reign of Gagik I became one of the most important phases of the "Golden Age" of Bagratid Armenia.

== Internal policy and centralization of the state ==
The main goal of Gagik I Bagratuni's internal policy was the consolidation of royal power and the preservation of Armenia's political unity. During his reign, Bagratid Armenia reached the peak of its power, and the central authority was significantly strengthened.

Gagik I bore the titles of "Shahanshah" ("King of Kings") and "King of the Armenians and Georgians", which symbolized his supremacy not only over the Kingdom of Ani but also over the subordinate kingdoms and principalities of Armenia. His suzerainty was also recognized by the rulers of Vaspurakan, Kars, Lori (Tashir-Dzoraget), and Syunik. In 1001, King David of Tashir-Dzoraget attempted to rebel against the central authority. Gagik I quickly organized a campaign, entered his domains, and stripped him of most of his lands, as a result of which David became known in history by the nickname "Anhoghin" (the Landless). Later, David accepted Gagik's suzerainty, repented for his actions, and the king returned his domains.

Gagik I also pursued a policy of territorial expansion. He abolished the principality of Vayots Dzor, annexed most of Artsakh to his kingdom, including Khachen, and conquered the Kogovit and Tsaghkotn cantons from the Kingdom of Vaspurakan. These actions contributed to the strengthening of Armenia's territorial integrity and the development of centralized state administration.

== Foreign policy ==
=== Relations with Byzantium ===
One of the important directions of Gagik I Bagratuni's foreign policy was relations with the Byzantine Empire. One of the main goals of the policy pursued by King Gagik I was to prevent Byzantium from interfering in the internal affairs of Greater Armenia. The Byzantine emperors recognized Gagik's authority and influence in the region. Diplomatic and economic ties were maintained between the two states, and in certain cases, they cooperated against common enemies. During Gagik's reign, relations between Armenia and Byzantium were mostly peaceful, which contributed to the stable development of the country.

=== Relations with Georgia ===
Gagik I also paid special attention to relations with Georgia. He bore the title "King of Armenians and Georgians", which testifies to his great authority in the region. Friendly and allied relations were maintained between Armenian and Georgian rulers, which were particularly directed at resisting external threats. Georgian princes often recognized Gagik's suzerainty or cooperated with him, maintaining political stability in the South Caucasus. This cooperation also contributed to the development of trade and the security of the region.

=== Relations with Arab emirates ===
During Gagik's reign, Armenia continued to maintain relations with neighboring Arab emirates. Gagik I successfully suppressed the encroachments of some emirs of Dvin and Atropatene. As a result of his military and diplomatic successes, the Arab emirates were forced to reckon with the power of Bagratid Armenia, and the country's international prestige increased further. At the end of his rule, Armenia was considered one of the most influential Christian states in the South Caucasus.

== Military activities ==
During the years of Gagik I Bagratuni's reign, Armenia's military power and defense capability were significantly strengthened. One of the important directions of King Gagik's internal and external policy became the improvement of the military system. Gagik I created a powerful, standing, and well-armed army, the number of which is mentioned in historical sources as about 100,000 soldiers. The army consisted of various branches: infantry, cavalry, and special military detachments. The main part of the troops consisted of royal and princely forces, but the king sought to ensure the presence of a standing military force subordinate to the central authority. One of the main goals of Gagik's military policy was the consolidation of Armenia's positions in the South Caucasus. During his reign, the Armenian army was able to withstand both the attacks of Arab emirates and the pressure of other regional forces. The king also attached great importance to allied relations, especially with Georgia, which made it possible to fight against common enemies with joint forces. The most significant event of Gagik's military activity was the Battle of Tsumb in 998. At that time, the emir of Atropatene, Mamlan, invaded Armenia with a large army, aiming to weaken the Bagratuni kingdom and expand his influence in the region. Faced with this threat, Gagik I quickly organized the country's defense and concluded an alliance with the Georgian kingdom. The joint Armenian-Georgian army met Mamlan's troops near the village of Tsumb. During the battle, the Armenian and Georgian forces defeated the enemy. Mamlan's army retreated from the territory of Armenia. After the victory in the Battle of Tsumb, Gagik's prestige rose even higher, and Bagratid Armenia became one of the most powerful states in the region.

== Economic development ==
During the years of Gagik I Bagratuni's reign, Armenia experienced a period of economic upsurge. The political stability of the country, the powerful central authority, and the improvement of external relations contributed to the development of various branches of the economy. Under Gagik I, Bagratid Armenia became one of the most important economic centers of the region. The main branch of the economy continued to be agriculture. Farming and animal husbandry developed, and cultivated land areas expanded. The production of grain, grapes, and horticultural crops particularly increased. Irrigation systems were built and repaired, which made it possible to increase crop yields and meet the growing needs of the country's population. During Gagik's reign, crafts and the urban economy also experienced great development. The capital Ani turned into not only a major political but also an economic center. Metallurgy, weaponry, jewelry making, leatherworking, textile production, and other crafts were highly developed here. Craftsman communities were formed in the cities, and products were sold both domestically and in foreign markets.

The development of trade was of particular importance. Armenia was located at the crossroads of important international trade routes that connected Byzantium, the Middle East and the Caucasus. The political stability provided during Gagik's time contributed to the expansion of trade ties. Armenian merchants actively participated in regional trade, exporting agricultural products, craft goods, and importing various commodities. Ani also became an important center of economic development, reaching great prosperity during Gagik's era. New buildings, markets, commercial centers, and fortifications were constructed in the city. The development of Ani also contributed to the economic activation of adjacent regions. Gagik I also supported ecclesiastical and construction activities, which further stimulated the economy. The construction of monasteries, churches, and urban structures contributed to the development of construction, crafts, and labor employment.

== Culture, education and church building ==
The years of Gagik I Bagratuni's reign are considered one of the most important phases of the cultural upsurge of Bagratid Armenia. The political and economic stability of the country contributed to the development of science, education, literature, and architecture. The king paid great attention to the preservation and dissemination of culture, supporting the development of educational centers and ecclesiastical structures.

=== Education and science ===
During Gagik's reign, the development of Armenian educational traditions continued. Monastic schools operated where theology, philosophy, grammar, history, literature, and foreign languages were taught. Monasteries were also important educational centers, simultaneously serving as scientific and manuscript centers. During this period, great attention was also paid to the creation and preservation of manuscripts. The activities of scribes and miniaturists developed, and many valuable manuscripts were created. Armenian intellectuals continued to develop historiography and literature, preserving the national cultural heritage.{

=== Literature and art ===
The era of Gagik I was marked by the development of Armenian literature and art. Historical, religious, and philosophical works were created. Monasteries played an important role in cultural life, becoming not only spiritual but also scientific centers. In art, miniature painting experienced particular development, through which manuscripts were decorated.

=== Church building ===
Gagik I Bagratuni provided great support to church building, viewing it as an important means of strengthening state and national identity. During his reign, numerous churches and monasteries were built and renovated, becoming both spiritual and cultural centers. One of the most prominent structures of this period was the Cathedral of Ani, the construction of which began during the reign of Smbat II the Master of the Universe and was completed during the era of Gagik I. The cathedral became one of the masterpieces of Armenian architecture and symbolized the power and high cultural level of Bagratid Armenia. Gagik I also supported the development of the city of Ani, where palaces, churches, fortifications, and other public buildings were constructed.

=== Old photographs ===
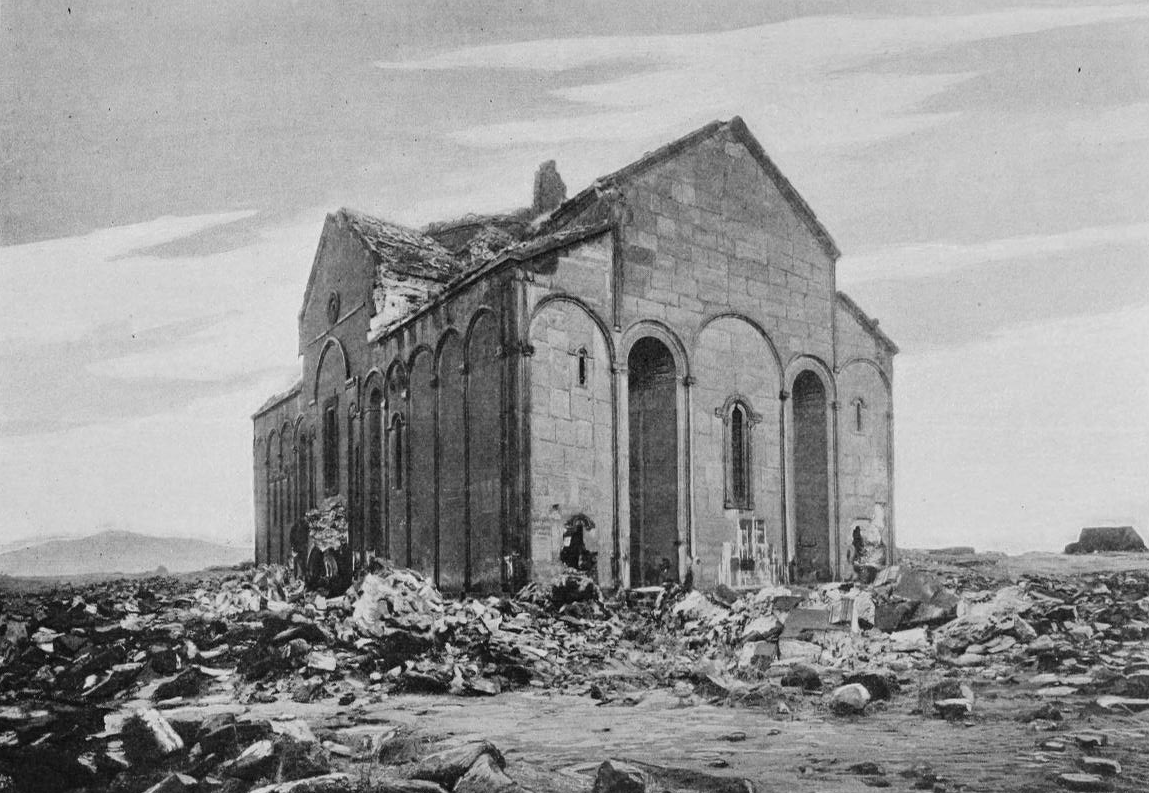
Cathedral of Ani in 1901

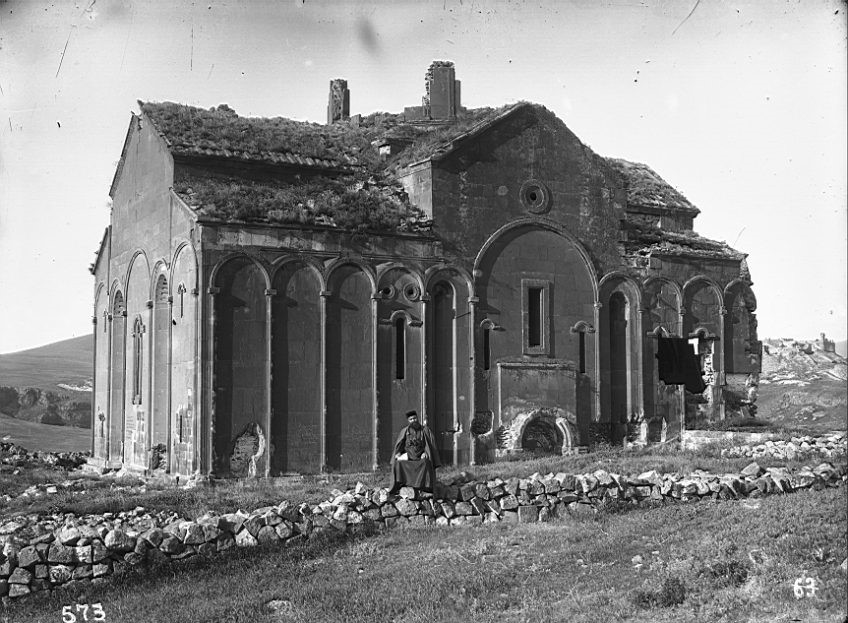
Cathedral of Ani in 1905

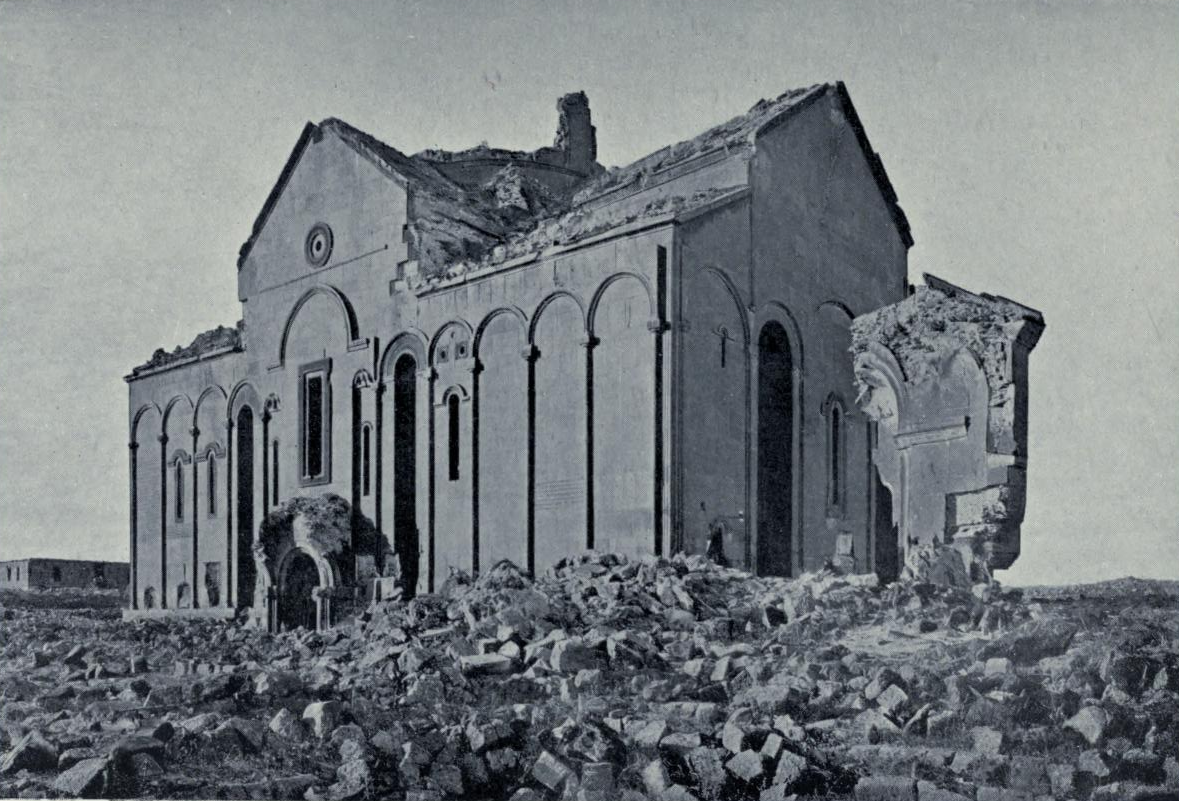
Cathedral of Ani in 1912

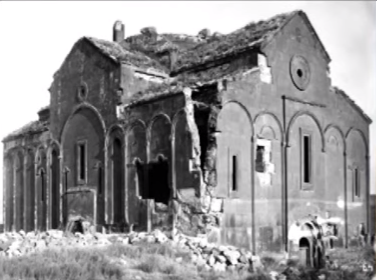
Cathedral of Ani in 1914

=== Modern appearance of the cathedral ===
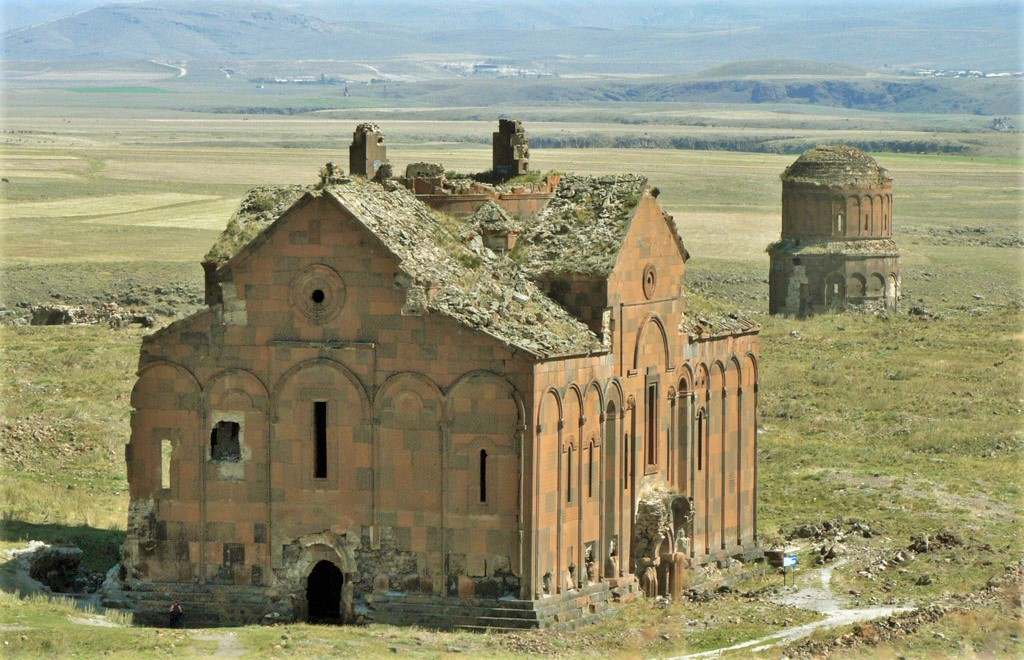
Cathedral of Ani in 2006

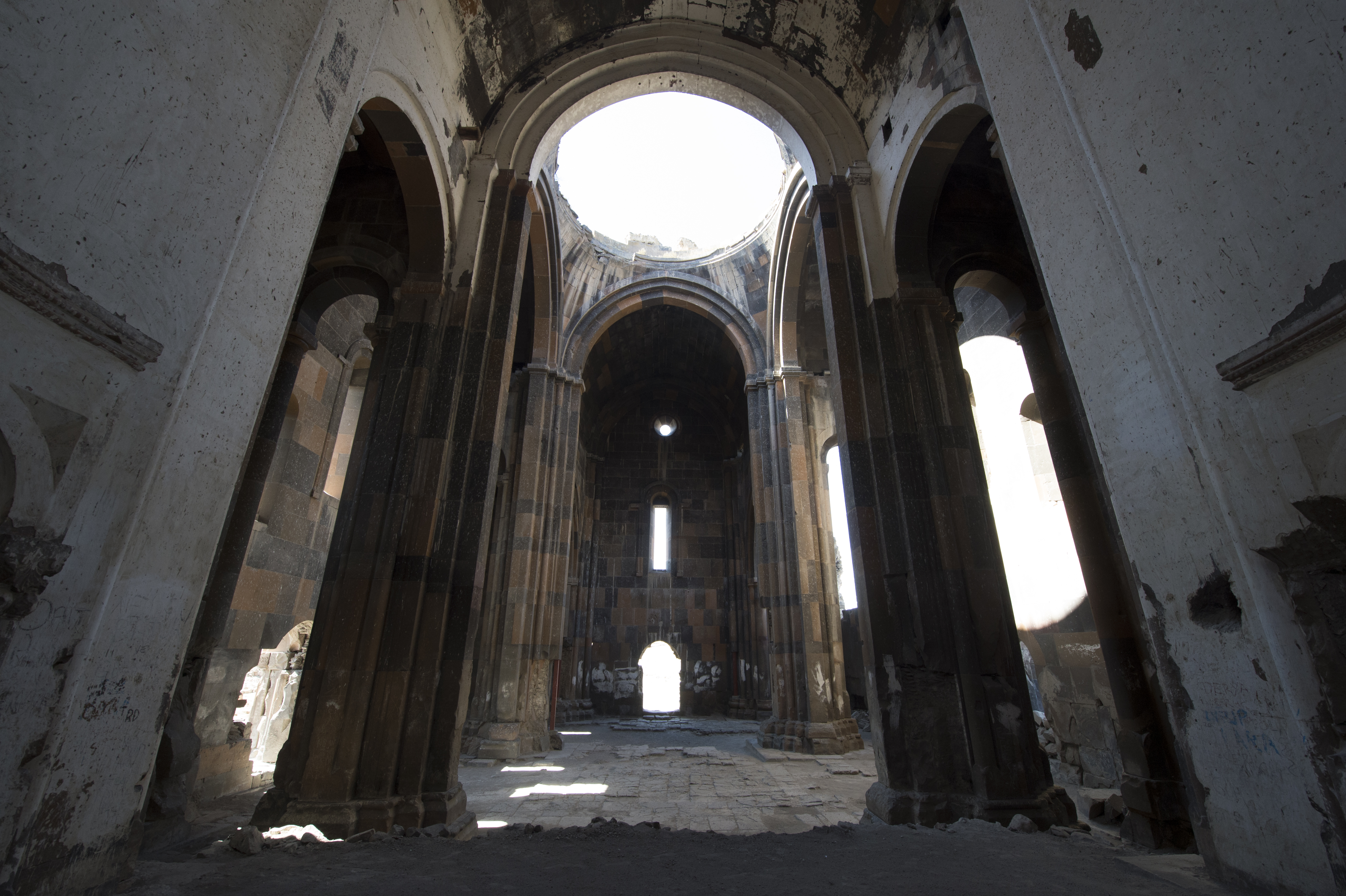
Interior view of the Cathedral of Ani in 2012

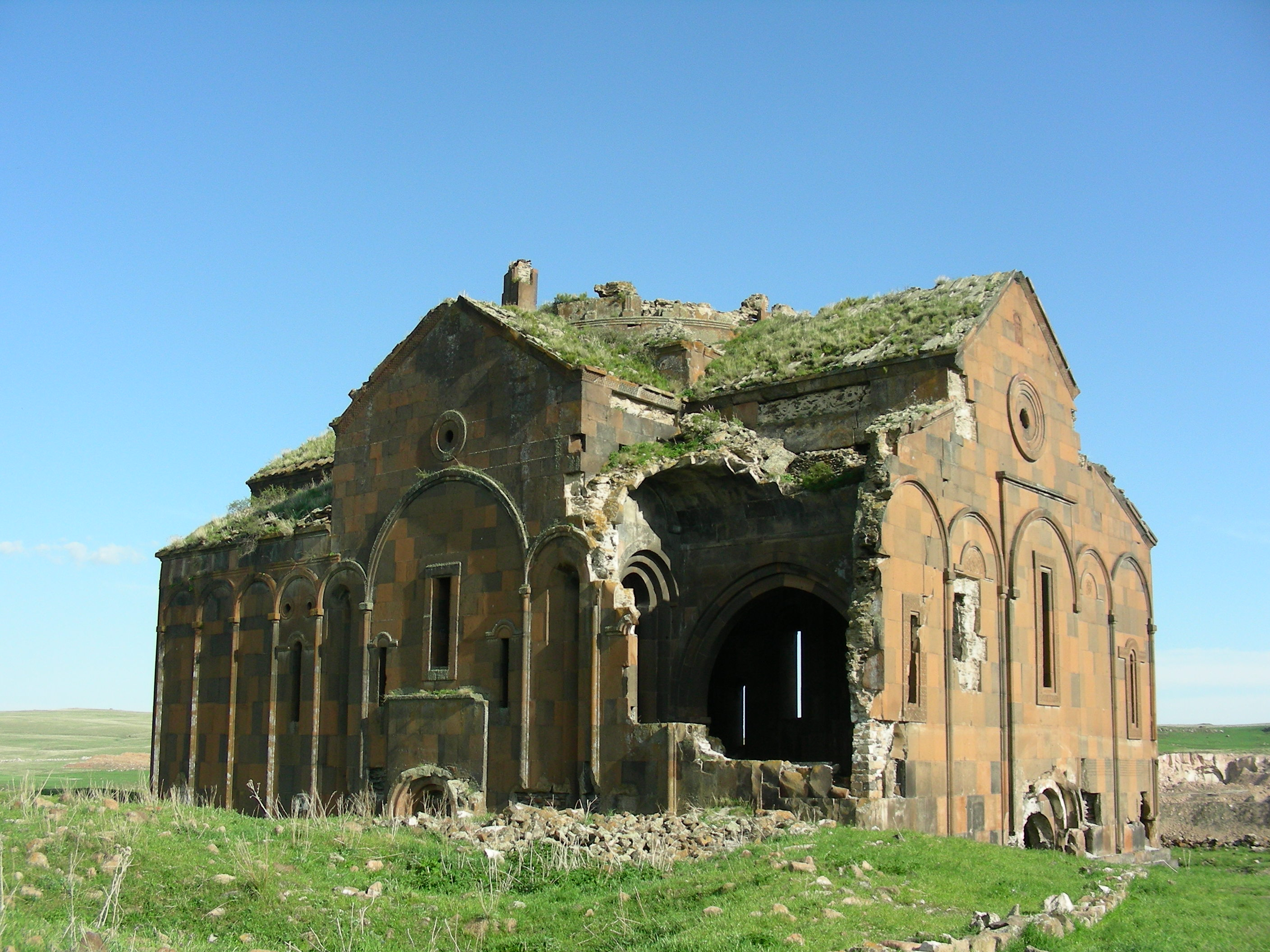
Cathedral of Ani in 2007

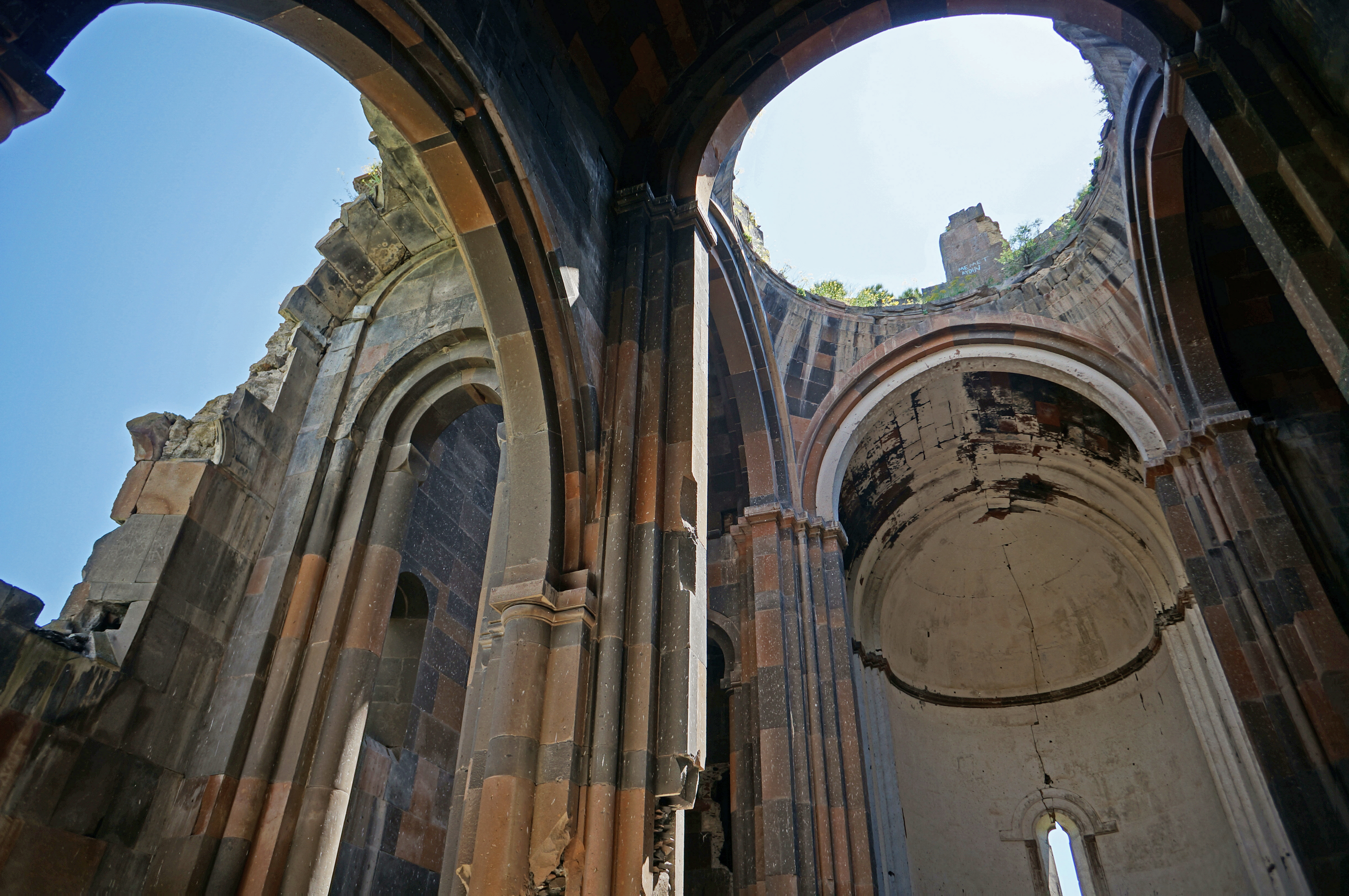
Interior view of the Cathedral of Ani in 2013

== Development of the capital Ani ==
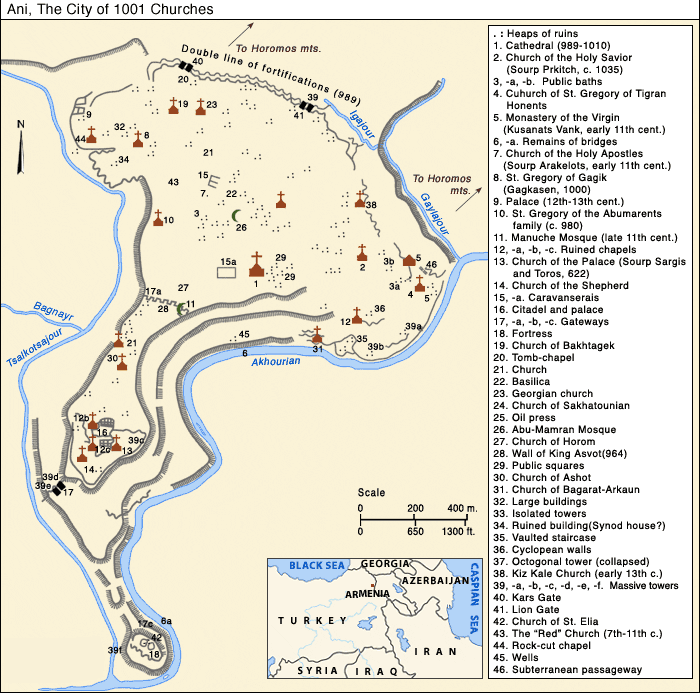
Plan of the city of Ani

During the years of Gagik I Bagratuni's reign, the city of Ani reached one of the highest stages of its development and became not only the political but also the main economic and cultural center of Armenia. The rise of Ani was connected with the strengthening of the Bagratuni kingdom, the country's economic growth, and the expansion of international trade. During Gagik's reign, large-scale construction works were carried out in Ani. The city was improved, and new palaces, churches, commercial centers, and public buildings were built. To ensure the defense of Ani, the city walls were fortified, becoming one of the best examples of medieval military architecture. The economic importance of Ani increased especially due to its location. The city was situated on important trade routes that connected the Byzantium, Georgia, Persia and the Middle East. For this reason, many merchants and artisans concentrated here. Jewelry making, metallurgy, pottery, textile production, and other crafts were highly developed. The markets of Ani became one of the largest commercial centers in the region. The city also became a cultural and spiritual center. Schools, scriptoria, and monastic institutions operated here, where many manuscripts were created and preserved. The churches built in Ani testified to the high development of Armenian architecture. During the era of Gagik I, the construction of the Cathedral of Ani was completed, becoming one of the main symbols of the city. The development of Ani also contributed to population growth. The city became a populous center inhabited by artisans, merchants, clergymen, and state officials. Because of the city's wealth and beauty, people called it the "city of a thousand and one churches".

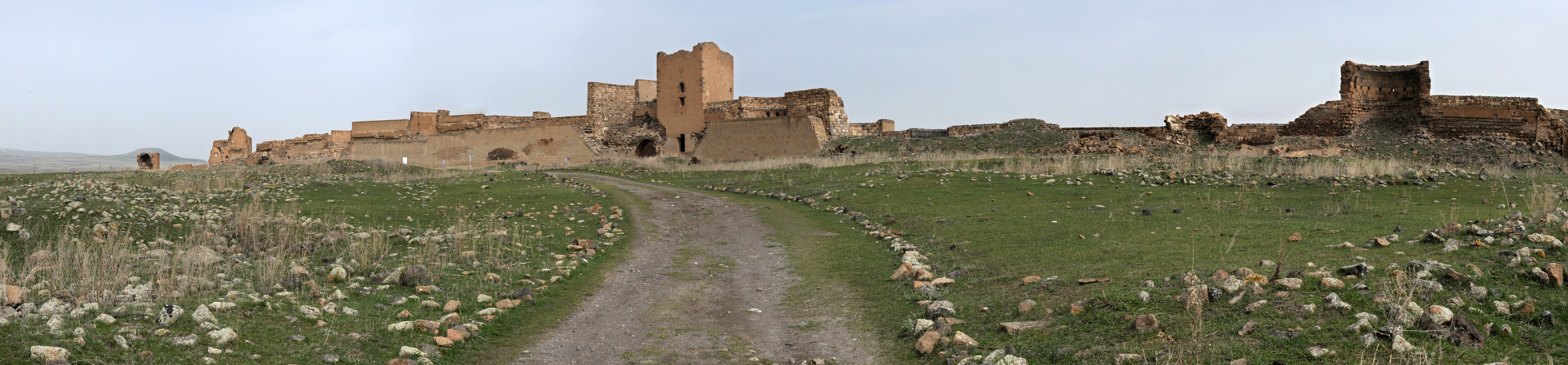
The ruins of the city of Ani

== Death and legacy ==
Gagik I Bagratuni died in 1020, after a successful reign lasting about three decades. After his death, the Armenian throne passed to his son, Hovhannes-Smbat Bagratuni. However, after Gagik's death, the political situation in the country gradually became complicated, as his successors did not have the same authority and influence as their father. He was able to strengthen the central authority, expand the country's territories, develop the army, and raise Armenia's international prestige. During his reign, the capital Ani became one of the most important cities in the region, known for its developed trade, architecture, and cultural life. With Gagik's support, education, literature, and church building developed, which contributed to the flourishing of Armenian medieval culture. Gagik's greatest legacy is considered the creation and consolidation of a powerful and independent Bagratid Armenia. His reign is often viewed as the most important phase of the "Golden Age" of the Bagratuni kingdom, when Armenia was one of the most influential states in the South Caucasus.

== Archaeological finds ==
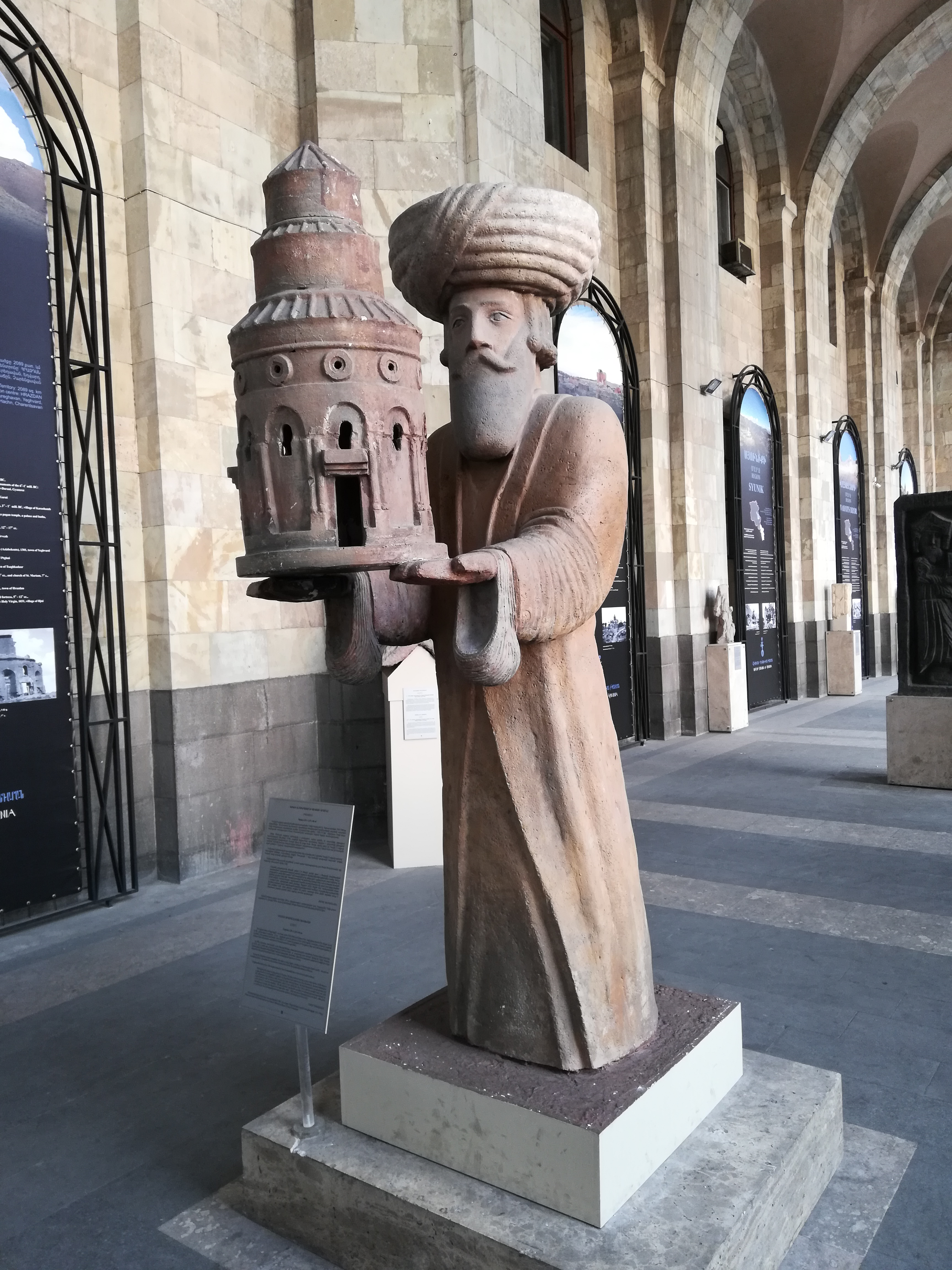
A replica of Gagik's statue at the entrance of the History Museum of Armenia.

One of Gagik's principal projects was the Church of St. Gregory in Ani (1001–10), loosely modeled on Zvartnots. During Nicholas Marr's excavation of the city's ruins in 1906, a 2.26-meter high statue of King Gagik holding a model of his church was found in fragments. It shows Gagik wearing a turban on his head and a khalat, which indicates that he was recognized by the Abbasid Caliphate. The statue was originally located in a niche high up in the north facade of the church. It was lost in uncertain circumstances at the end of the First World War. Only a few photographs record its appearance. A surviving fragment of the statue is now in the Erzurum archaeological museum. Exactly how, and when, it got there is unknown. According to the museum staff, it was found somewhere in the vicinity of Erzurum and the finder brought it to the museum by car.

A replica sculpted by Hrach Galstyan in 1993 is displayed at the entrance of the History Museum of Armenia in Yerevan.

== Bibliography ==
- Alpoyajyan, A. (1946). Պատմութիւն հայ դպրոցի [History of the Armenian School] (in Armenian). Cairo.
- Arakelyan, B. (1958). Քաղաքները և արհեստները Հայաստանում IX-XIII դդ [Cities and Crafts in Armenia in the 9th–13th Centuries] (in Armenian). Yerevan: Academy of Sciences of the Armenian SSR Publishing.
- Հայկական սովետական հանրագիտարան [Armenian Soviet Encyclopedia] (in Armenian). Vol. 2. Yerevan: Armenian SSR Academy of Sciences. 1976.
- Chahin, M. (2001). The Kingdom of Armenia: A History (2. rev. ed.). Richmond, Surrey: Curzon. ISBN 9780700714520.
- Ghafadaryan, K. (1952). Անի քաղաքը և նրա պեղումները [The City of Ani and Its Excavations] (in Armenian). Yerevan: Academy of Sciences of the Armenian SSR Publishing.
- Ghazaryan, M. (1960). Հայկական մանրանկարչությունը IX–XI դդ. [Armenian Miniature Painting in the 9th–11th Centuries] (in Armenian). Yerevan: Academy of Sciences of the Armenian SSR Publishing.
- Grousset, R. (1947). Histoire de l'Arménie des origines à 1071 [History of Armenia from the Origins to 1071] (in French). Payot.
- Hakobyan, T. (1968). Հայաստանի պատմական աշխարհագրություն [Historical Geography of Armenia] (in Armenian). Yerevan: Mitk.
- Հայ ժողովրդի պատմություն [History of the Armenian People] (in Armenian). Yerevan: Institute of History of the NAS RA. 2010.
- Janashia, S. (1946). Վրաստանի պատմություն [History of Georgia] (in Armenian). Tbilisi.
- Madelung, Wilfred (1975). "The Minor Dynasties of Northern Iran". In Frye, Richard N. (ed.). The Cambridge History of Iran. Vol. 4. Cambridge University Press. p. 237.
- Manandyan, H. (1940). Հայաստանի քաղաքները XI–XII դարերում [The Cities of Armenia in the 11th–12th Centuries] (in Armenian). Yerevan: Haypethrat.
- Manandyan, H. (1952). Քննական տեսություն հայ ժողովրդի պատմության [Critical Theory of the History of the Armenian People] (in Armenian). Yerevan: Haypethrat.
- Matthew of Edessa (1973). Ժամանակագրություն [Chronicle] (in Armenian). Yerevan: Hayastan Publishing.
- Movsisyan, A. (2010). Հայոց պատմության հիմնահարցեր [Fundamental Questions of Armenian History] (in Armenian). Yerevan: YSU Publishing.
- Orbeli, H. (1966). Դիվան հայ վիմագրության [Corpus of Armenian Epigraphy] (in Armenian). Yerevan. p. 35.
- Sargsyan, S. (1969). Հայ ռազմական արվեստի պատմություն [History of Armenian Military Art] (in Armenian). Yerevan: Hayastan Publishing.
- Stepanos Taronetsi (2000). Տիեզերական պատմություն [Universal History] (in Armenian). Yerevan: YSU Publishing.
- Ter-Ghevondyan, A. (1965). Արաբական ամիրայությունները Բագրատունյաց Հայաստանում [The Arab Emirates in Bagratid Armenia] (in Armenian). Yerevan: Academy of Sciences of the Armenian SSR Publishing.
- Toramanyan, T. (1942). Նյութեր հայկական ճարտարապետության պատմության [Materials on the History of Armenian Architecture] (in Armenian). Yerevan: Haypethrat.
- Yeghiazaryan, Arman (2017). ԱԲԱՍ ԲԱԳՐԱՏՈՒՆԻ [Abas Bagratuni] (in Armenian). Yerevan: YSU Publishing.
- Yuzbashyan, Karen (1973). К хронологии правления Гагика I Багратуни [On the chronology of the reign of Gagik I Bagratuni] (PDF). Antichnaya Drevnost I Srednii Veka (in Russian). 10: 195–97.

Preceded by Smbat II	King of Bagratid Armenia	Succeeded by Hovhannes-Bagrat III as King of Ani
Preceded by Smbat II	King of Bagratid Armenia	Succeeded by Ashot IV as King in other provinces
