= Karen Yuzbashyan =

Armenian historian

- Born: January 6, 1927; Tiflis, Georgian SSR
- Died: March 5, 2009 (aged 82); Saint Petersburg, Russia
- Education: Yerevan State University
- Scientific career
- Fields: Armenian studies, Byzantine studies, Oriental studies
- Workplaces: Armenian Academy of Sciences, Russian Academy of Sciences, Saint Petersburg State University

Karen Yuzbashyan (Armenian: Կարեն Նիկիտի Յուզբաշյան, Armenian pronunciation: [kaɾen juzbaʃˈjan]; Russian: Карен Никитич Юзбашян; January 6, 1927 – March 5, 2009) was an Armenian historian and specialist in medieval Byzantine and medieval Armenian studies. Yuzbashyan was the author of over 200 books and articles (published in Armenian, Russian, and other languages) on the political, legal, cultural aspects and relations of Byzantium and Armenia, as well as a researcher on the development of Armenian studies.

== Biography and scholarly activity ==
Born in Tiflis in 1927, Karen Yuzbashyan attended Yerevan State University from 1946 to 1948 and studied at Leningrad State University (now St Petersburg State University) from 1948 to 1951, receiving his degree in history. He worked and carried out research at the Matenadaran in Yerevan beginning in 1955 until he transferred to the Leningrad branch of the Institute of Oriental Studies in 1958. In 1974, he received his doktor nauk after completing his thesis on the work of the eleventh-century Armenian historian Aristakes Lastivertsi. Four years later, he was promoted to the head of the group for Historical and Cultural Studies at Leningrad's Department of Near Eastern Studies. From 1981 to 1991, Yuzbashyan headed the Leningrad branch of the Palestine Society. Just prior to the Soviet Union's collapse, Yuzbashyan was elected into the Armenian parliament, serving a five-year term (1990–1995) there.

Yuzbashyan's works spanned the early and medieval periods of Armenian history. In 1963, he published the first critical edition of Aristakes Lastivertsi's history (in the original classical Armenian language); he also translated Aristakes' work into Russian in 1968. In 1988, Yuzbashyan published a study on the Bagratuni Kingdom of Armenia and its relations with the Byzantine Empire. Working at the Russian Academy of Sciences, his articles were published in many international journals. He participated in and organized numerous international congresses and conferences. He taught at St Petersburg State University and was the doctoral adviser of many students who entered the field of Byzantine Studies. His most recent work (2005) was the compilation and cataloging of Armenian illuminated manuscripts at the university.

In addition to works on medieval Armenian history, Yuzbashyan also completed a biography of his academic mentor, Joseph Orbeli, in 1964.

A Festschrift, entitled Armenia between Byzantium and the Orient was published in his honor by Brill in 2019.

== Selected works ==
- (in French) "L'administration byzantine en Arménie aux Xe-XIe siècles," Revue des études Arméniennes 10 (1973-1974): 139–83.
- (in Russian) Armianskie gosudarstva epokhi Bagratidov i Vizantiia v IX–XI vv. [The Armenian state in the Era of the Bagratids and Byzantium in the 9th-11th centuries]. Moscow: Nauka, 1988.
- (in Armenian) Avarayri chakatamartits depi Nvarsaki paymanagire [From the Battle of Avarayr to the Treaty of Nvarsak]. Yerevan: Armenian Academy of Sciences, 1989.
- (in French) "L'Arménie et les Arméniens vus par Byzance," Byzantinische Forschungen 25 (1999).
- "The Armenian War of 450-451: Some Interpretations," Journal of Armenian Studies 7 (Fall-Winter 2002–2003).
