= Ashot IV of Armenia =

Ashot IV Աշոտ Դ
- King of Armenia; King of Ani

King of Armenia
- Reign: 1021–1039
- Predecessor: Gagik I
- Successor: Gagik II
- Issue: Gagik II
- Dynasty: Bagratuni
- Father: Gagik I
- Mother: Katranide

Ashot IV (Armenian: Աշոտ Դ, romanized: Ashot D, died c. 1040–41), surnamed Kaj (Armenian: Աշոտ Քաջ), i.e. "the Brave, the Valiant", was a king of Armenia from the Bagratuni dynasty, the younger son of King Gagik I and the brother of Hovhannes-Smbat. He reigned during the first half of the 11th century, a period marked by internal political struggles in Bagratid Armenia and the expansion of the Byzantine Empire toward Armenia.

== Origin and family ==
Ashot was a member of the Bagratuni dynasty. During the reign of Gagik I, the Kingdom of Ani reached considerable political and economic power, while Ani became one of the major centers of the region. After Gagik's death, however, the struggle for the throne between his sons weakened the central authority.

Gagik I's elder son was Hovhannes-Smbat, who inherited the throne of Ani after his father's death according to the principle of seniority. Ashot, as the younger son, did not accept this decision and advanced his own claim to the throne.

Ashot IV's son was the future king of Armenia, Gagik II, who after the deaths of his father and Hovhannes-Smbat became the last ruler of the Bagratid Kingdom of Ani.

== Struggle for the throne of Ani ==
After the death of Gagik I in 1020, Hovhannes-Smbat inherited the Armenian throne. Ashot did not recognize his brother's sole authority and began a struggle to obtain their father's throne. In this struggle he attempted to secure the support of both influential forces within Armenia and neighboring rulers.

Ashot appealed for assistance to Senekerim-Hovhannes Artsruni, king of the Kingdom of Vaspurakan. With auxiliary troops received from Vaspurakan, he marched against Hovhannes-Smbat and approached Ani.

According to summaries of the sources, after traveling to Vaspurakan, Ashot also established contacts with the Caliphate of Baghdad and received material assistance from there. On his return, he visited the monastery of Varaga Surb Nshan and made a donation to the monastery.

The conflict developed into open warfare. Hovhannes-Smbat relied primarily on the fortifications of Ani and on the princes who supported him, while Ashot pursued a more active military policy. Historical tradition portrays him as a prince who personally participated in battles and achieved military successes.

Ashot's forces were able to win victories and approach Ani. However, representatives of the Armenian nobility and neighboring Christian rulers intervened in the war. The Pahlavuni princes, the Catholicos of Armenia, and Georgian-Abkhaz political forces played an important role in establishing peace.

== Agreement of 1022 ==
The struggle between the brothers resulted in a political compromise. Under the agreement concluded in 1022, Hovhannes-Smbat was to continue ruling in Ani and the surrounding territories, while Ashot was to receive the provinces of the kingdom located mainly toward the borders with Iran and Georgia.

Ani-Shirak and several important provinces and fortresses remained under Hovhannes-Smbat's authority, while Ashot was to rule a considerable portion of the rest of the kingdom. At the same time, it was established that after Hovhannes-Smbat's death, Ashot would inherit his territories and become ruler of the entire Bagratid kingdom.

This event has been interpreted in different ways in historiography. For a long time, Armenian historiography accepted the view that the unified kingdom of Gagik I was effectively divided into two parts. R. Matevosyan, however, challenged this interpretation and argued that the recognition of Ashot's rights did not mean the creation of two separate and independent kingdoms. In his view, a temporary dual monarchy was established, which continued until the accession of Gagik II.

According to the same study, the territory that came under Ashot's authority is referred to in the sources as “Druts Ashkharh”.

== Relations with Hovhannes-Smbat ==
The agreement of 1022 did not definitively end the conflict between the brothers. Ashot continued to claim the entire Bagratid kingdom, while Hovhannes-Smbat sought to preserve the throne of Ani and his immediate possessions.

The sources preserve an account according to which Ashot pretended to be ill in Talin and invited his brother to meet him. Hovhannes-Smbat arrived in Talin and was arrested. Ashot handed him over to Apirat Pahlavuni, but the latter refused to kill the king, returned him to Ani, and restored him to the throne.

This episode indicates that internal tensions persisted at the Bagratid court despite the arrangement of dual rule. At the same time, part of the Armenian nobility sought to prevent the brothers' struggle from leading to the complete collapse of state institutions.

== Byzantine factor ==
Ashot IV's activities coincided with the increasing pressure of the Byzantine Empire on Armenia. During the reign of Emperor Basil II, Byzantium steadily expanded its eastern frontiers, bringing a number of Armenian and Georgian territories under its control.

During the initial stage of his struggle, Ashot sought assistance in Vaspurakan and the Arab world, but later also appealed to Emperor Basil II for support. Ashot received Byzantine military assistance during his struggle against Hovhannes-Smbat.

Byzantine intervention, however, later became a threat not only to Hovhannes-Smbat but also to Ashot's own hereditary rights. In 1022, Hovhannes-Smbat negotiated with Basil II through the Armenian Catholicos Petros I Getadardz. Under the agreement reached at Trebizond, the Kingdom of Ani was to pass to the Byzantine Empire after Hovhannes-Smbat's death.

This agreement contradicted the earlier arrangement between Ashot IV and Hovhannes-Smbat, according to which the throne of Ani was to pass to Ashot after Hovhannes-Smbat's death. Thus, two conflicting hereditary claims to Ani emerged simultaneously: Ashot's claim as the legitimate Bagratid heir and the Byzantine claim based on Hovhannes-Smbat's testament.

This contradiction later became one of the important causes of the political crisis of the Bagratid Kingdom of Ani.

== Consolidation of power ==
Sources concerning the later period of Ashot IV's life are relatively scarce. The historical tradition based on information provided by Aristakes Lastivertsi portrays him as a king who expanded the territory under his authority and gained control of several provinces and fortresses.

Although Ashot was unable to gain possession of Ani, his authority was maintained over a considerable part of the territory of the Bagratid state. Consequently, during the 1020s and 1030s, Bagratid Armenia effectively had two simultaneous centers of royal authority: Hovhannes-Smbat's court in Ani and Ashot IV's domain.

A distinctive feature of Ashot's political position was that he simultaneously had to struggle with his brother over the inheritance, resist pressure from neighboring Muslim rulers, and take into account the growing influence of Byzantium. For this reason, his foreign policy position changed over time according to the political circumstances of the moment.

== The epithet “the Valiant” ==
The epithet the Valiant associated with Ashot's name derives from his military reputation. Armenian historiographical tradition contrasts him with Hovhannes-Smbat, who was less active in military affairs. Matthew of Edessa portrays Ashot as a warrior who distinguished himself in battle and achieved victories.

The form Ashot IV the Valiant also appears in English-language Byzantine studies. In the chronological list of Armenian rulers in The Oxford Handbook of Byzantine Studies, he is listed under that name.

== Death and legacy ==
The exact year of Ashot IV's death is not consistent across the sources. His death is dated to 1040 and the beginning of his reign to 1022. By contrast, the chronological list in The Oxford Handbook of Byzantine Studies gives the reign of Ashot IV the Valiant as 1021–1039. In other works, his death is sometimes placed in 1041, around the time of Hovhannes-Smbat's death.

Ashot never had the opportunity to implement the provision of the 1022 agreement under which he was to rule the entire Bagratid kingdom after Hovhannes-Smbat's death. Following the deaths of both brothers, a new successi on crisis arose, as Byzantium attempted to enforce Hovhannes-Smbat's testament and take possession of Ani.

A group of Armenian princes, led by the sparapet Vahram Pahlavuni, supported the preservation of Bagratid statehood. In 1042, Ashot IV's son Gagik II, who was still young at the time, was placed on the throne.

With the accession of Gagik II, the dual rule that had arisen during the reigns of Hovhannes-Smbat and Ashot IV was temporarily ended, and the Bagratid territories were once again united under the authority of a single ruler.

However, Bagratid statehood did not survive for long. The Byzantine Empire continued to demand the surrender of Ani, and in 1045 the Bagratid Kingdom of Ani passed under Byzantine rule.

== See also ==
- Bagratid Armenia
- Gagik I of Armenia
- Hovhannes-Smbat
- Gagik II of Armenia
- Ani
- Bagratuni dynasty

== Sources ==
- Matthew of Edessa (1898). Chronicle. Vagharshapat.
- Matevosyan, R. I. (1979). The Struggle for the Throne During the Reign of the Successors of Gagik I. pp. 182–188.
- "ASHOT IV". Armenian Soviet Encyclopedia. Vol. 1. p. 488.
- "HOVHANNES-SMBAT". Armenian Soviet Encyclopedia. Vol. 6.
- "Rulers". The Oxford Handbook of Byzantine Studies. Oxford University Press.
- Alexanyan, Vardan (2024). Relations Between the Ecclesiastical and Political Authorities of Armenia on the Eve of the Fall of the Bagratid Kingdom of Ani-Shirak.
