= Sebastia =

Sebastia (also Sebastea, Sebasteia; Greek Σεβαστεία) is from the Koine Greek name Sebasteia (Σεβάστεια), meaning that it was named in honour of an emperor using the title Sebastos, the Greek equivalent of Augustus.

It may refer to:

- Sebastia, Nablus, a Palestinian village in the West Bank
- Sivas (Latin: Sebasteia), an Ancient Roman city, now Sivas in Turkey
- Sebasteia (theme), a Byzantine province named after the city
- Malatia-Sebastia District, in Yerevan, Armenia
- Sebastia (moth), a moth genus

== See also ==
- Sant Sebastià
- Sebastian (disambiguation)
