= Bagratid Armenia =

Armenian state ruled by the Bagratuni dynasty (885–1045)

- 880s–1045
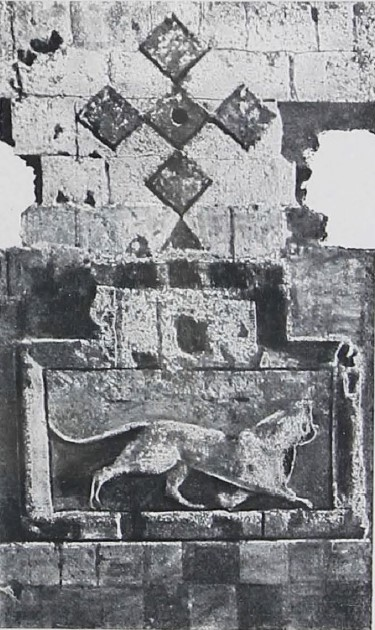
- The coat of arms of Ani and the Bagratids as appeared on the city walls (ramparts) (see vectorized version) (Note: Engraved on Ani's Principal Gate (Avag Dur), this bas relief depicts a lion or a leopard within a frame with a checkered cross above it. Modern scholars believe that it is the symbol of Ani in particular and the Bagratids in general. Karen Matevosyan suggested that the big cat represents secular power and the cross symbolizes religious authority, both based in Ani during the 11th century. This photograph is from the early 1900s, before the sculpture was significantly altered during a Turkish restoration in the late 1990s, when the cross was destroyed and the frame was reshaped into a rectangle (seen on modern photographs).)

- Bagratuni Armenia and other medieval Armenian kingdoms c. 1000
- Status: Independent kingdom
- Capital: Bagaran (885–890); Shirakavan (890–929); Kars (929–961); Ani (961–1045)
- Common languages: Armenian
- Religion: Christianity (Armenian Apostolic)
- Government: Monarchy
- King
  - 885–890: Ashot I
  - 890–914: Smbat I
  - 914–928: Ashot II
  - 928–953: Abas I
  - 953–977: Ashot III
  - 977–989: Smbat II
  - 989–1020: Gagik I
  - 1020–1040 (1021–1039): Hovhannes-Smbat III; Ashot IV (concurrently)
  - 1042–1045: Gagik II
- Historical era: Middle Ages
  - Established: 880s
  - Disestablished: 1045
- Currency: Byzantine Hyperpyron; Abbasid Dinar
Preceded by
Arminiya
Kaysites
Succeeded by
Byzantine Empire
Kingdom of Syunik
Kingdom of Artsakh
Kingdom of Tashir-Dzoraget
Armenian Kingdom of Cilicia

Bagratid Armenia (Note: Armenian: Բագրատունիների թագավորություն) was an independent Armenian state established by Ashot I of the Bagratuni dynasty in the early 880s following nearly two centuries of foreign domination of Greater Armenia under Arab Umayyad and Abbasid rule. With each of the two contemporary powers in the region—the Abbasids and Byzantines—too preoccupied to concentrate their forces on subjugating the region, and with the dissipation of several of the Armenian nakharar noble families, Ashot succeeded in asserting himself as the leading figure of a movement to dislodge the Arabs from Armenia.

Ashot's prestige rose as both Byzantine and Arab leaders—eager to maintain a buffer state near their frontiers—courted him. The Abbasid Caliphate recognized Ashot as "prince of princes" in 862 and, later on, as king (in 884 or 885). The establishment of the Bagratuni kingdom later led to the founding of several other Armenian principalities and kingdoms: Taron, Vaspurakan, Kars, Khachen and Syunik. During the reign of Ashot III (952/53–77), Ani became the kingdom's capital and grew into a thriving economic and cultural center.

The first half of the 11th century saw the decline and eventual collapse of the kingdom. The Byzantine emperor Basil II (r. 976–1025) won a string of victories and annexed parts of southwestern Armenia; King Hovhannes-Smbat felt forced to cede his lands and in 1022 pledged that his kingdom would pass to the Byzantines following his death. However, after Hovhannes-Smbat's death in 1041, his successor, Gagik II, refused to hand over Ani and continued resistance until 1045, when his kingdom, plagued by internal and external threats, was finally taken by Byzantine forces.

== History ==
=== Background ===
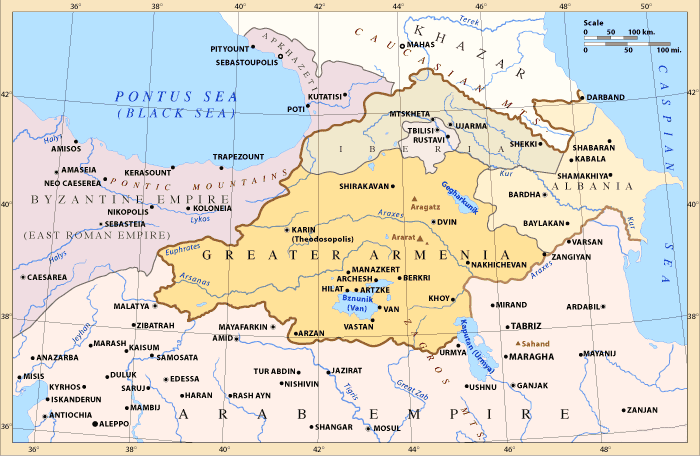
Emirate of Armenia under Arab rule, prior to the establishment of the Bagratid dynasty

The weakening of the Sasanian Empire during the 7th century led to the rise of another regional power, the Muslim Arabs. The Arabs under the Umayyad Caliphate had conquered vast swaths of territory in the Middle East and, turning north, began to periodically launch raids into Armenia territory in 640. Theodore Rshtuni, the Armenian Curopalates, signed a peace treaty with the Caliphate, although the continuing war with the Arabs and Byzantines soon led to further destruction throughout Armenia. In 661, Armenian leaders agreed to submit to Muslim rule while the latter recognized Grigor Mamikonian from the powerful Mamikonian nakharar family as ishkhan (prince) of Armenia. Known as al-Arminiya with its capital at Dvin, the province was headed by an ostikan, or governor.

However, Umayyad rule in Armenia grew in cruelty in the early 8th century. Revolts against the Arabs spread throughout Armenia until 705, when under the pretext of meeting for negotiations, the Arab governor of Nakhichevan massacred almost all of the Armenian nobility. The Arabs attempted to conciliate the Armenians but the levying of higher taxes, impoverishment of the country due to a lack of regional trade, and the Umayyads' preference of the Bagratuni family over the Mamikonians (other notable families included the Artsruni, Kamsarakan, and Rshtuni) made this difficult to accomplish. Taking advantage of the overthrow of the Umayyads by the Abbasids, a second rebellion was conceived, although it too was met with failure, partly because of the tense relationship between the Bagratuni and Mamikonian families. The rebellion's failure also resulted in the near disintegration of the Mamikonian house which lost most of the land it controlled (members of the Artsruni house were able to escape and settle in Vaspurakan).

A third and final rebellion, stemming from similar grievances as the second, was launched in 774 under the leadership of Mushegh Mamikonian and with the support of other nakharars. The Abbasids marched into Armenia with an army of 30,000 men and decisively crushed the rebellion and its instigators at the Battle of Bagrevand on April 24, 775, leaving a void for the sole largely intact family, the Bagratunis, to fill.

=== Rise of the Bagratids ===
The Bagratuni family had done its best to improve its relations with the Abbasid caliphs ever since they took power in 750. The Abbasids always treated the family's overtures with suspicion but by the early 770s, the Bagratunis had won them over and the relationship between the two drastically improved. The members of the Bagratuni family were soon viewed as leaders of the Armenians in the region. Following the end of the third rebellion, which the Bagratunis had wisely chosen not to participate in, and the dispersal of several of the princely houses, the family was left without any formidable rivals. Nevertheless, any immediate opportunities to take full control of the region were complicated by Arab immigration to Armenia and the caliph's appointment of emirs to rule in newly created administrative districts (emirates). But the number of Arabs residing in Armenia never grew in number to form a majority nor were the emirates fully subordinate to the Caliph. As historian George Bournoutian observes, "this fragmentation of Arab authority provided the opportunity for the resurgence of Bagratuni leadership under Ashot Msaker [the 'Meat-Eater']".

Ashot began to annex the lands that formerly belonged to the Mamikonians and actively campaigned against the emirs as a sign of his allegiance to the Caliphate, who in 804 bestowed upon him the title of ishkhan. Upon his death in 826, Ashot bequeathed his land to two of his sons: the eldest, Bagrat II Bagratuni received Taron and Sasun and inherited the prestigious title of ishkhanats ishkhan, or prince of princes, whereas his brother, Smbat the Confessor, became the sparapet of Sper and Tayk.

The brothers, however, were unable to resolve their differences with one another nor able to form a unified front against the Muslims. A new Armenian rebellion against Arab rule broke out in 850 led by Bagrat and Ashot Artsruni of Vaspurakan but like previous rebellions, it failed: an Arab army led by the Turkic general Bugha al-Kabir captured Bagrat, Smbat, and other Armenian princes and brutally put down the rebellion.

=== Establishment of the kingdom ===
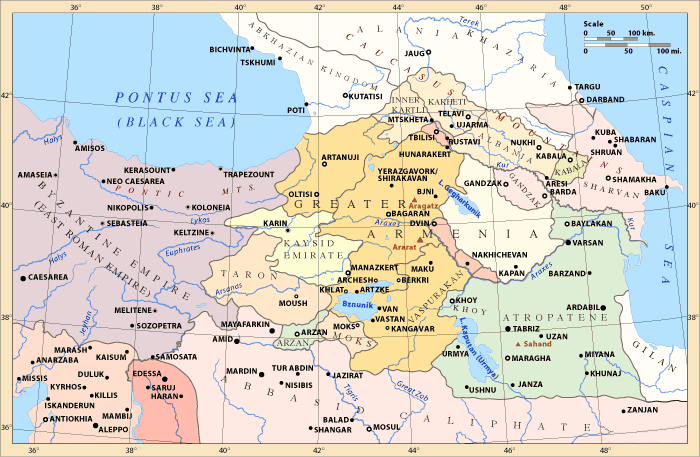
Rise of the Kingdom of Armenia under the Bagratid dynasty

In 857, Smbat had been succeeded by his son Ashot I, who took a measured approach to gradually retake territories formerly held by the Arabs. He assumed the title prince of princes in 862 and appointed his brother Abas sparapet, as they began to push the Arabs out from their base in Tayk. His initial efforts to expel the ostikan of Arminiya failed, although this did not dissuade him in taking advantage of the Byzantine-Arab rivalry.

Early on, he was courted by a Byzantium desperate to secure its eastern flank so as to direct its full strength against the Arabs; although Ashot avowed his loyalty to the empire, Byzantine leaders continued their long-standing demand that the Armenian Church make religious concessions to the Eastern Orthodox Church. A synod of Armenian church leaders was convoked and a letter laden with equivocal wording sent to Constantinople was able to sustain a temporary agreement between the two churches. In any case, religious differences mattered little to the Byzantines in consideration of the menace the Arabs continued to pose. In 884, the Caliph Al-Mu'tamid, reacting to the demands of Armenian princes and religious leaders and, more importantly, the security risks in allowing Armenia to fall under the Byzantine orbit, sent a crown to Ashot, recognizing him as king. This act was not lost on Basil who, according to Armenian historians Vardan Arewelts‘i (d. 1271) and Kirakos Gandzakets‘i (c. 1200–1271), similarly sent a crown to Ashot. Ashot relocated his throne to the fortress-city of Bagaran and it was here where his coronation ceremony was held sometime in 884 or 885.

Thus, Ashot restored the Armenian monarchy and became Armenia's first king since 428. He secured the favor of both the Byzantines and Arabs but ultimately showed loyalty to Basil and chose to conclude an alliance with the Byzantines in 885. Ashot was not the sole Armenian prince of the region (other principalities existed in Syunik, Vaspurakan, and Taron) yet he commanded the full support of the other princes who recognized his authority in his becoming of king. With his status of king, his authority also carried over to the neighboring states of Georgia, Caucasian Albania and several of the Arab emirates. Ashot's reign was brief and upon his death in 890, he was succeeded by his son Smbat I.

=== Smbat I ===
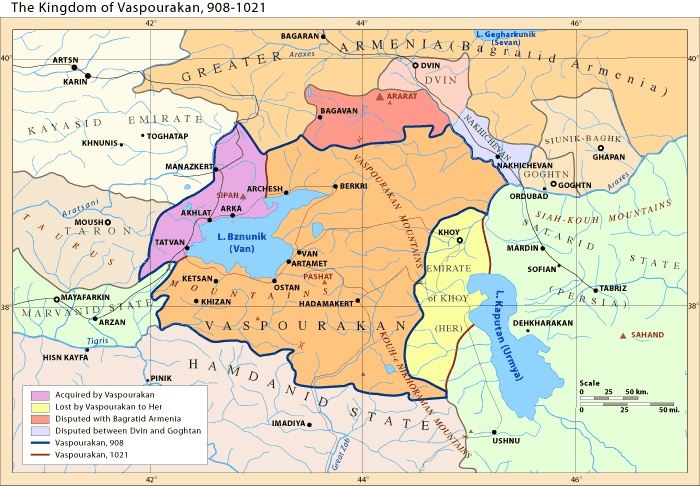
The kingdom of Vaspurakan, formed in 908

Smbat I was crowned king in 892, following a brief attempt by his uncle Abas to disrupt his succession to the throne. Smbat continued his father's policy of maintaining cordial relations with Byzantium but he remained mindful of the Arabs' fears of the Armeno-Byzantine alliance. Speaking with the Arab ostikan Muhammad Ibn Abi'l-Saj (Afshin), Smbat convinced him that the alliance would not only be for the dual benefit of Byzantium and Armenia but would also work to the economic favor of the Arabs. Smbat also achieved a major victory when on April 21, 892, he recaptured the historic city of Dvin from the Arabs.

Smbat's successes quickly came to a halt when Afshin decided that he could not countenance a powerful Armenia so close to his domains. He retook Dvin and managed to take Smbat's wife as a hostage until she was released in exchange for Smbat's son Mushegh, and his nephew, also named Smbat. The wars against Armenia continued even after Afshin's death in 901, when his brother Yusuf Ibn Abi'l-Saj became ostikan of Arminiya. While Yusuf's reign was not immediately hostile, Smbat committed a series of blunders which led to several of his allies to turn their backs on him: having sought to placate his eastern ally, Smbat of Syunik, by ceding to him Nakhichevan city, Smbat inadvertently drove Gagik Artsruni of Vaspurakan into Yusuf's arms since the city was a part of Gagik's domains. Yusuf took advantage of this feud by awarding Gagik a crown in 908, thus making him King Gagik I of Vaspurakan and creating an Armenian state opposed to the one led by Smbat.

As Yusuf began a new campaign against Smbat in conjunction with Gagik in 909, neither the Byzantines nor the Caliph sent aid to Smbat; several Armenian princes also chose to withhold their support. Those who did ally with Smbat were dealt brutally by Yusuf's powerful army: Smbat's son Mushegh, his nephew Smbat, and Grigor II of Western Syunik were all poisoned. Yusuf's army ravaged the rest of Armenia as it advanced towards Blue Fortress, where Smbat had taken refuge, and besieged it for some time. Smbat finally decided to surrender himself to Yusuf in 914 in hopes of ending the Arab onslaught; Yusuf, however, showed no compassion towards his prisoner as he tortured the Armenian king to death and put his headless body on display on a cross in Dvin.

=== Resurgence under Ashot Yerkat ===
Yusuf's invasion of Armenia had left the kingdom in ruins and this fact resonated among the Armenian princes who were left aghast in witnessing the Arab ostikan's brutality. Gagik I was especially shaken and he soon disavowed his loyalty to Yusuf and began to campaign against him. With Yusuf distracted by the resistance put up by his former ally, Smbat's son Ashot II felt it appropriate to assume his father's throne. Ashot at once began to drive the Muslims out of his domains. Support for Ashot also arrived from the west: the Byzantine empress Zoe had watched the Arab invasion of Armenia unfold with consternation and so she ordered the Patriarch Nicholas Mystikos to write an official letter to the Armenian Catholicos to form a new alliance with Armenia. The Catholicos responded amicably and in 914, Ashot accepted an invitation by Zoe to visit Constantinople. There, Ashot was well received, and a Byzantine force was created to assist Armenia in defeating the Arabs. The force, accompanying Ashot and led by the Domestic of the Schools Leo Phokas, moved out the next year and marched along Upper Euphrates, entering Taron with scant opposition from the Arabs.

Meanwhile, Yusuf's efforts to crush Gagik had failed miserably; instead, Yusuf turned his attention to Ashot and attempted to weaken his position by crowning Ashot's cousin, Ashot Shapuhyan, king of Armenia. Ashot Shapuhyan's and Yusuf's armies, though, were unable to stop the Byzantine advance, which stopped short of capturing Dvin due to the onset of winter. Nevertheless, the force had returned Ashot to a powerful position in Armenia and managed to inflict heavy casualties against the Arabs. This still left Ashot, the anti-king, in control in Dvin and civil war raged on from 918 to 920, when the pretender finally conceded defeat. Numerous other rebellions in Armenia also took place but Ashot was able to defeat each one of them. In 919, Yusuf had instigated a failed rebellion against the Caliph and was replaced by a far more well-disposed ostikan, Subuk. Subuk recognized Ashot as the legitimate ruler of Armenia and awarded him with the title of Shahanshah, or "king of kings."

Ironically, the Byzantines were distressed with Ashot's close relations with the Arabs and dispatched a new force under the Armenian Domestic of the Schools John Kourkouas to disrupt Ashot's position as king and to support the rebels fighting him. In 928, Kourkouas reached Dvin in an unsuccessful attempt to capture a city that was defended by both the Arabs and Ashot. In 923, the Caliph, facing troubles at home, released Yusuf, who traveled back to Armenia to unleash his fury against Armenia and especially Gagik I. He began demanding tribute from the Armenian rulers but faced considerable resistance by Ashot II. Time and again, Ashot was able to defeat and rout the Arab armies sent against him for several years. Finally, in 929, Yusuf died and an immense power struggle ensued between rival Iranian and Kurdish families in Azerbaijan, thus reducing the Arab threat to Armenia. Byzantine emperor Romanos Lekapenos also turned his attention from the east to fight the Arabs in Syria. Ashot's efforts to preserve and defend the kingdom earned him the epithet "Yerkat", or Iron; he died in 929 and was succeeded by his brother, Abas I.

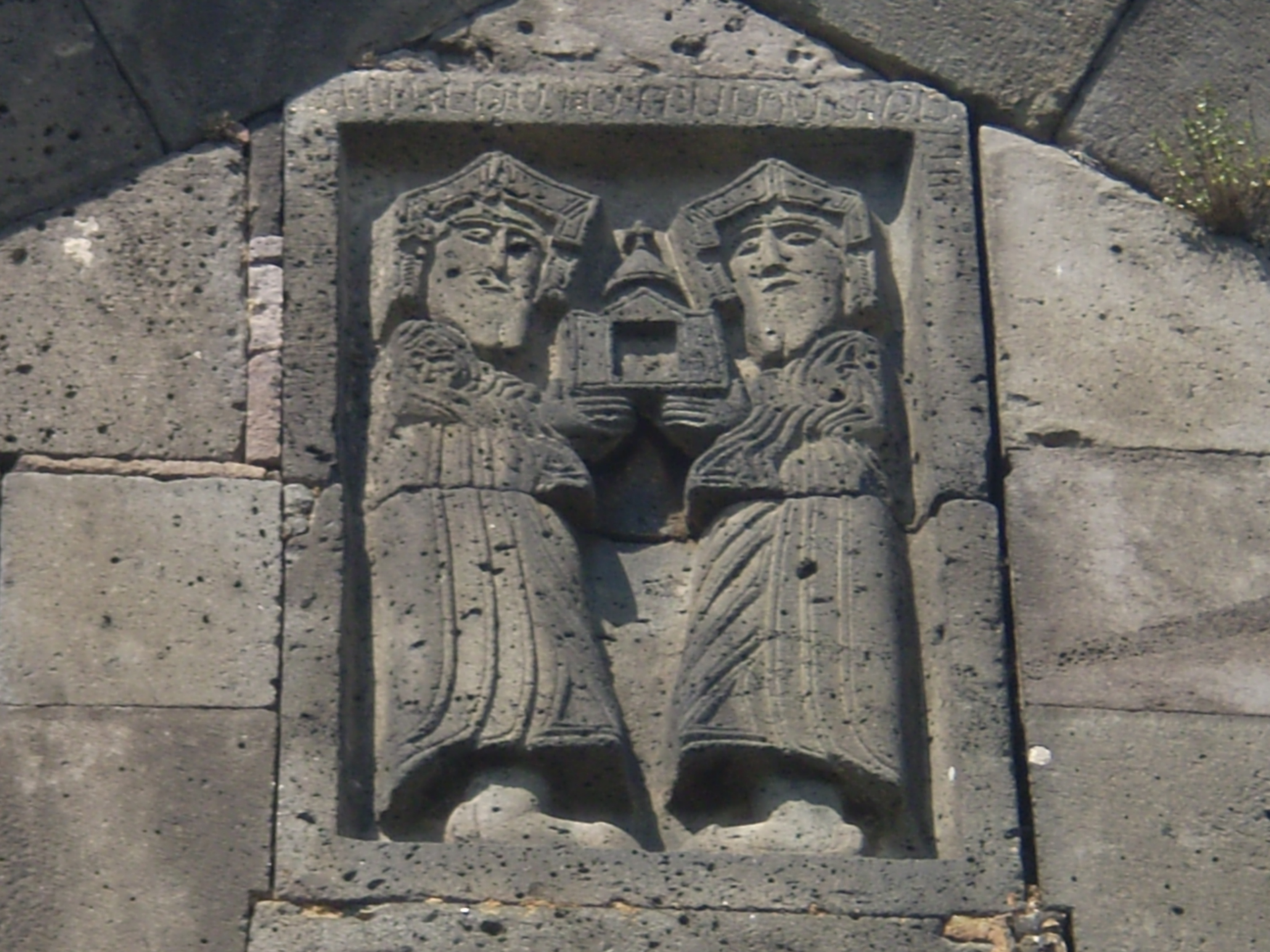
Relief carvings of Smbat and Gurgen Bagratuni at Sanahin

=== Stability under Abas ===
Abas I's reign was characterized with an unusual period of stability and prosperity that Armenia had not enjoyed for decades. His capital was based at the fortress-city of Kars and Abas achieved numerous successes on both the foreign and domestic fronts. In the same year that he became king, Abas traveled to Dvin, where he was able to convince the Arab governor there to release several Armenian hostages and turn over control of the pontifical palace back to Armenia. Conflict between the Arabs were minimal too, with the exception of a military defeat Abas suffered near the city of Vagharshapat. He was far less conciliatory towards the Byzantines, who had repeatedly demonstrated their unreliability as allies by attacking and annexing Armenian territories. Romanus of Byzantium was also more focused on fighting the Arab Hamdanids, leaving Abas virtually free to conduct his policies without foreign hindrance.

Another foreign threat that Abas steadfastly confronted was an invasion by king Ber of Abkhazia in 943: a new church had been completed in Kars under Abas' orders and prior to its consecration, Ber had appeared with an army along the river of the Araxes, demanding that the new church be consecrated under Chalcedonian rite. Abas refused to make any concessions and ambushed Ber's forces in a dawn assault. Several more skirmishes took place, wherein Ber was finally captured by Abas' men. Abas took the king to his new church and told him that he would never see it again, blinding him and sending him back to Abkhazia. Abas died in 953, leaving his kingdom to his two sons, Ashot III and Mushegh.

=== Armenia's Golden Age ===
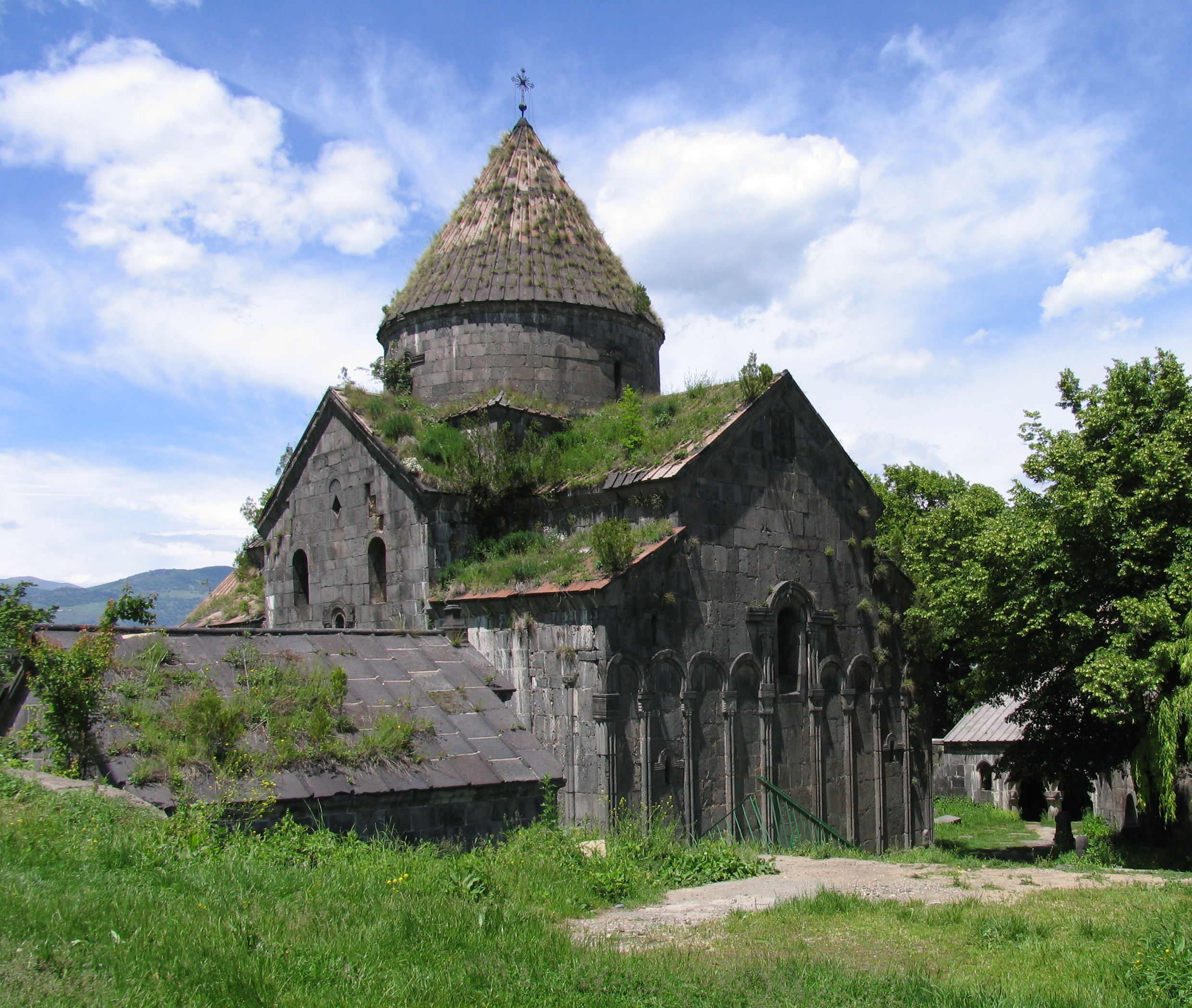
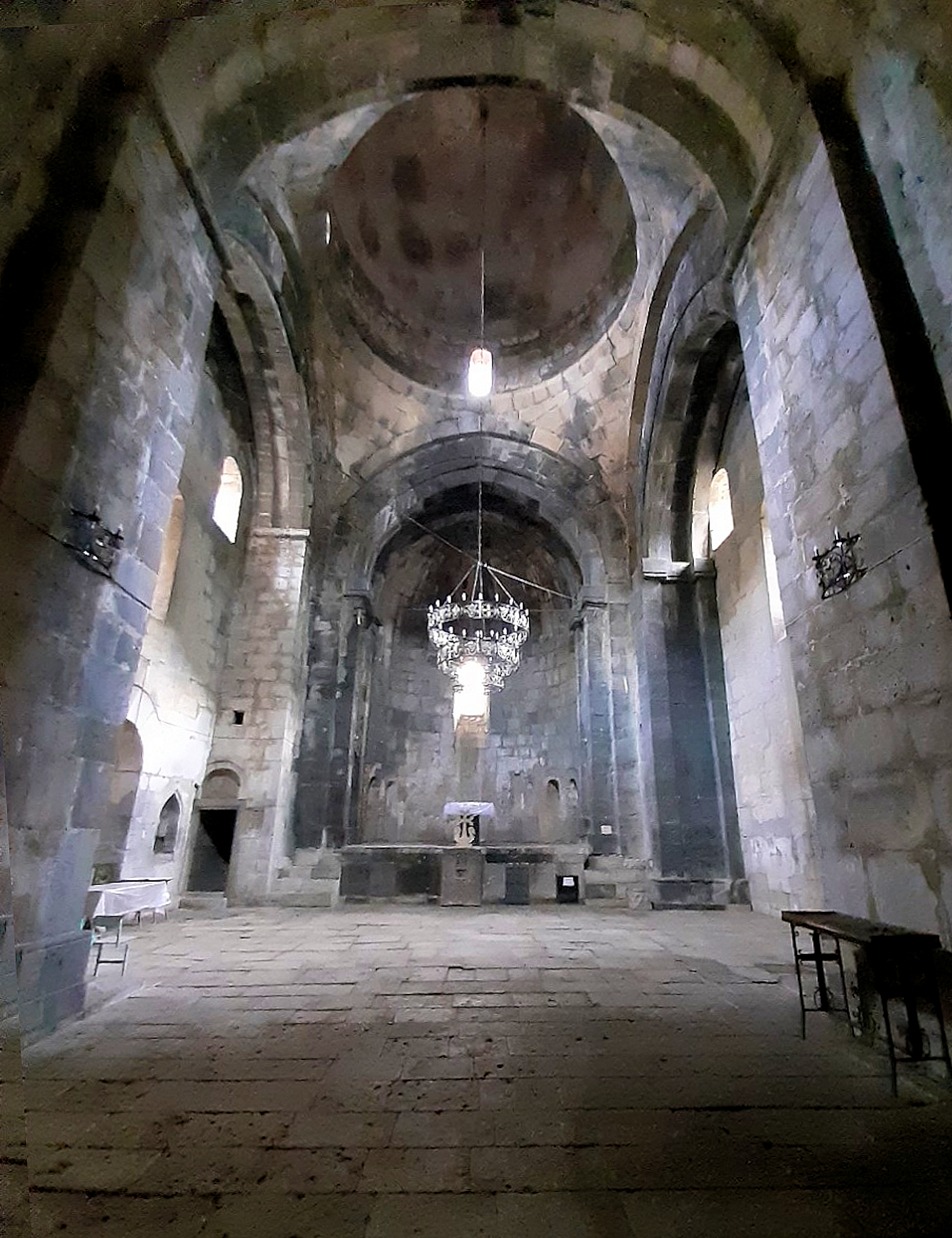
St. Amenaprkich (Holy Savior) Church in Sanahin Monastery was built by Queen Khosrovanush, wife of king Ashot III, in 966

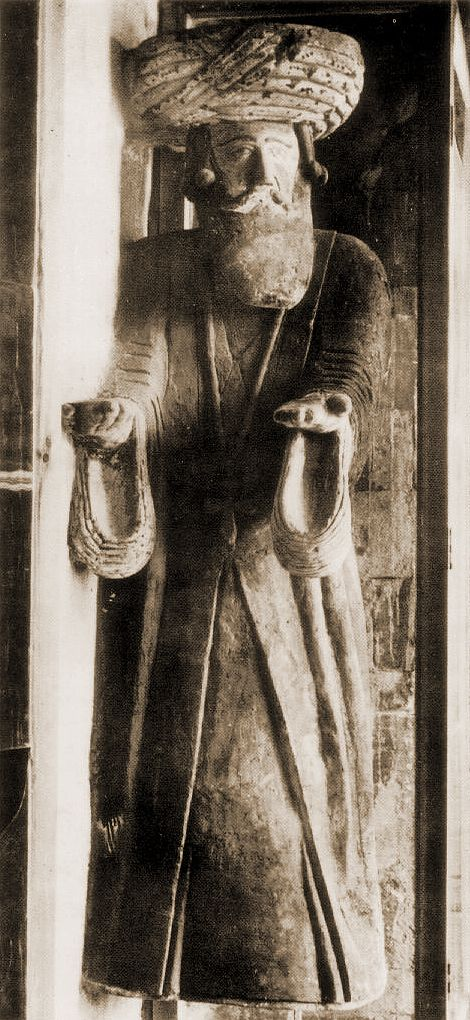
A statue of King Gagik I that originally had him holding a model of the Church of St. Gregory.

Ashot III's official investiture as king of Armenia took place in 961, following the relocation of the Holy See of Cilicia from Vaspurakan to Argina, near the city of Ani. In attendance were several contingents of the Armenian military, 40 bishops, the king of Caucasian Albania, as well as Catholicos Anania Mokatsi who crowned the king with the title of shahanshah. In that same year, Ashot had also relocated the capital from Kars to Ani. The Bagratuni kings had never chosen a city to settle in, alternating from Bagaran to Shirakavan to Kars; Kars never did reach a status where it could become a capital and Dvin was disregarded altogether, given its proximity to the hostile emirates. Ani's natural defenses were well suited Ashot's desire to secure an area which could withstand siege and fell on a trade route that passed from Dvin to Trebizond.

Owing to this trade route, the city quickly began to grow and became Bagratuni Armenia's chief political, cultural and economic center. Shops, markets, workshops, inns were established by the city's merchants and populace while the nakharar elite went on to sponsor the building of magnificent mansions and palaces. The construction was also complemented by the King Ashot's own philanthropy, including the building of the famed "Ashotashen" walls that were erected around Ani, monasteries, hospitals, schools, and almshouses (his wife Khosrovanuysh also founded the monastery complexes at Sanahin in 966 and Haghpat in 976). Ashot's sponsorship of the construction of all these edifices earned him the nickname of "the Merciful" (Voghormats) Ashot was also largely successful in foreign affairs. When a Byzantine army led by the Byzantine emperor John I Tzimiskes entered Taron in 973, purportedly to avenge the death of his Domestic killed at the hands of the Arabs in Mosul, Ashot mobilized an 80,000 man army to meet and force its withdrawal. In the following year, he concluded an alliance with Tzimiskes and sent 10,000 Armenian troops to campaign with the emperor against the Muslim emirates in Aleppo and Mosul. Ashot also had unsuccessfully attempted to capture Dvin from the Shaddadid emir in 953; he had laid siege to it for quite some time but was forced to lift it after finding the city too well defended.

=== Sub-kingdoms ===
A new phenomenon that began under Ashot III's reign, and continued under his successors, was the establishment of sub-kingdoms throughout Bagratuni Armenia. Ashot III had sent his brother Mushegh I to rule in Kars (Vanand) and had allowed him to use the title of king. The administrative district of Dzoraget near Lake Sevan was given to Ashot's son Gurgen, the progenitor of the Kyurikid line, in 966, who would later assume the title of king. The proliferation of so many kingdoms worked to the benefit of Armenia so long as the king in Ani remained strong and maintained his hegemony over other kings. Otherwise, the kings, as well their respective bishops who would claim the position of catholicos and formulate their own doctrines, would begin to test the limits of their autonomy.

==== The regional branches of Bagratid rule ====
The political structure of Bagratid Armenia was not limited to the royal lands of Ani. Earlier Armenian princely houses and younger branches of the Bagratuni dynasty governed other territories, sometimes as subordinate kings and sometimes with substantial independence. The relationship depended on the strength of the shahanshah at Ani, dynastic marriages, military alliances and rivalry with neighboring emirs. The most important regional entities included the following principalities and kingdoms.

- Taron: The Bagratid principality developed in lands previously associated with the Mamikonians. It was governed by the descendants of Bagrat II and passed under Byzantine control in the tenth century, conventionally dated to 966–967. A later branch of the family continued to exercise authority in Sasun.
- Vaspurakan: The Artsruni royal house ruled around Lake Van from 908. The kingdom became an important centre of Armenian art and architecture, including the church of the Holy Cross at Aghtamar. Its king Senekerim-Hovhannes surrendered the kingdom to Byzantium in 1021–1022 in exchange for territories near Sebastia.
- Kars or Vanand: The kingship was established under Mushegh, brother of Ashot III, after the relocation of the capital to Ani. Kars served as a major fortress and a centre for the younger Bagratid line. Its last ruler Gagik-Abas relinquished his territory to the Byzantines in the 1060s.
- Tashir-Dzoraget: Founded by Gurgen (Kiurike), son of Ashot III, around 978, this kingdom was ruled by the Kiurikian dynasty. Its principal strongholds included Samshvilde and later Lori Fortress, together with Kayan, Mahkanaberd and Gag. The line survived the fall of Ani and later continued through smaller principalities.
- Syunik: Smbat of the Siunia dynasty assumed the royal title in 987 and subsequently recognized the suzerainty of Ani. Its political centres included Shaghat and later Kapan. The kingdom endured after 1045, though its borders and relations with neighboring rulers changed.
- Khachen: The principalities of Artsakh were associated with the wider network of Armenian political authorities and, at various times, acknowledged the supremacy of the Bagratid kings. Branches of the regional princely houses continued to exercise authority after the fall of Ani.

=== Progress under Smbat and Gagik ===
This prosperous age which Armenia lived through continued unabated under the reign of Ashot's son and successor, Smbat II. Ani had grown so large by the time of Smbat's accession in 977, that a second set of walls, known as the Smbatashen walls, were ordered built by the new king.

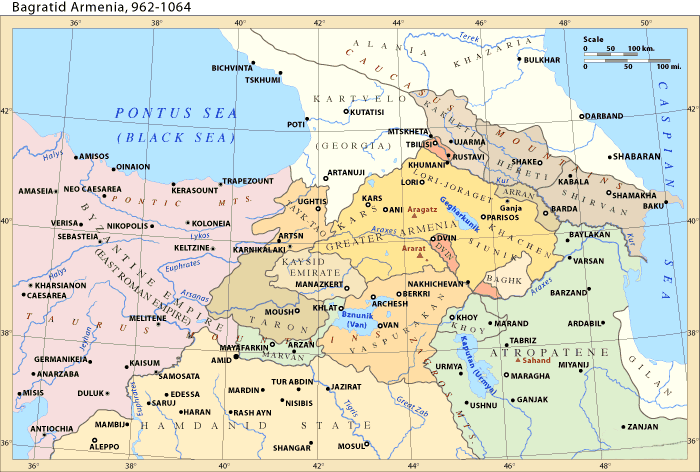
Bagratid Armenia and neighboring Armenian states of Vaspurakan, Taron, Syunik-Baghk, Khachen, etc.

=== Decline and Byzantine encroachment ===
The Byzantines had slowly been creeping eastward towards Armenia in the final decade of the 10th century. Emperor Basil II's numerous victories against the Arabs and internal Arab struggles helped clear a path towards the Caucasus. Constantinople's official policy was that no Christian ruler is equal to or independent of the Byzantine emperor, and even if it was at time masked with diplomatic compromises, the empire's ultimate goal was the complete annexation of the Armenian realms. By the middle of the 10th century, the Byzantine Empire lay along the full length of the western border of Armenia. Taron was the first Armenian region annexed by the Byzantine Empire. In a certain sense, the Byzantines considered the Bagratuni princes of Taron as their vassals, for they had consistently accepted titles, such as that of strategos, and stipends from Constantinople. With the death of Ashot Bagratuni of Taron in 967 (not to be confused with Ashot III), his sons Gregory and Bagrat were not able to withstand the pressure from the empire, which annexed their principality outright and converted it to a theme.

The Ardzruni kingdom of Vaspurakan was later annexed as well. In 1003, the last ruler of the kingdom Senekerim-Hovhannes, son-in-law of King Gagik I of Ani, had brushed aside his nephews to become the sole king of Vaspurakan. His rule became even more precarious in the second decade of the 11th century with the plundering raids of various Turkmen groups. In 1016, Senekerim-Hovhannes thus offered Basil II the lands of Vaspurakan, including 72 fortresses and 3000-4000 villages, in exchange for a vast domain farther west on the Byzantine territory centered on the city of Sebastia to which he moved in 1021 together with his family and 14,000 retainers. Basil II had meanwhile already sent an army from the Balkans to Vaspurakan (which they also called Vasprakania, Asprakania, or Media) even before Senekerim-Hovhannes' offer and reduced it to another Byzantine theme with Van as regional capital. With the fall of the Ardzruni kingdom, Byzantine power was firmly established on the Armenian highlands, with only the Bagratuni and Eastern Syunik and Baghk kingdoms remaining independent.

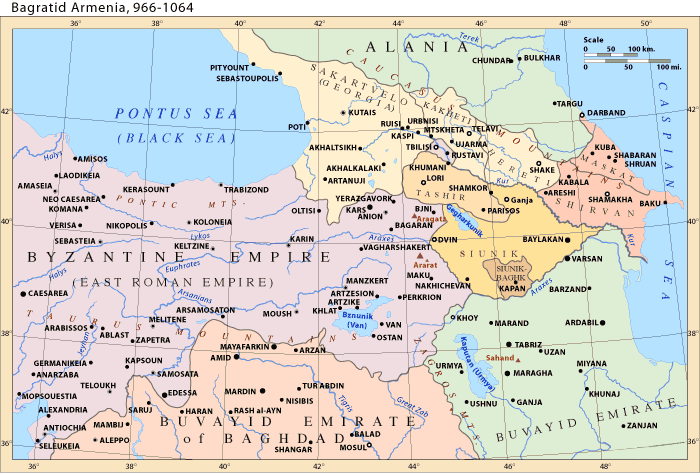
Bagratid Armenia, annexed by the Byzantine Empire and Syunik

=== Internal quarrels and fall ===
Royal enthronement scene from the frontispiece of a gospel commissioned by Gagik-Abas, ruler of Kars circa 1050.

After the death of King Gagik I (in 1017 or 1020), the kingdom was split between his two sons, Hovhannes-Smbat who received the territory of Ani, and Ashot IV the Brave who kept a territory that should have included Dvin, but which he could not occupy because of its capture by the Shaddadid Abu'l-Aswar Shavur ibn Fadl from Gandzak. The two brothers fought throughout their lives. In these tumultuous days, embroiled in territorial quarrels, the childless Hovhannes-Smbat sent Catholicos Petros Getadardz to Byzantium in order to negotiate a partial respite by leaving his kingdom to the empire after his death. Immediate results of this action were unknown, but after the death of the two brothers in 1040–41, the new Byzantine emperor and successor to Basil II claimed the kingdom of Bagratid Armenia. The son of Ashot, young Gagik II with the support of sparapet Vahram Pahlavouni and his followers, reigned only for a period of two years. Despite internal dissention led by pro-Byzantine overseer or steward Sargis Haykazn, the Armenian king was able to repel a Turkmen attack. However, possibly with the persuasion of Sargis, he accepted the invitation of emperor Constantine IX to Constantinople, where he was obliged to cede his domain to the empire in exchange for a domain in Cappadocia. In 1044, the Byzantines twice invaded Ani but failed to conquer it. In view of this dire situation, Catholicos Petros Getadardz, who governed Ani in the king's absence, surrendered Ani to the Byzantines in 1045. Ani was then annexed to the theme of Iberia which was renamed "Iberia and Ani" or "Iberia and Armenia".

The Bagratid king of Kars, Gagik-Abas, still kept his throne even after 1064 when Ani fell to the Seljuk Turks, but even he was constrained to cede his lands to the Byzantines and retreat to Anatolia, only to see Kars captured by the Turks in 1065. In Baghk and Eastern Syunik, only a few Armenian fortresses remained.

==== Aftermath of the annexation ====
The Byzantine annexation of Ani in 1045 ended the central Bagratid kingship, but it did not immediately eliminate every Armenian political institution. The kingdoms of Syunik and Tashir-Dzoraget, as well as the princes of Khachen, continued in varying forms. Byzantine officials reorganized Ani and the surrounding districts within their eastern provincial administration, while the former king Gagik II received estates in Cappadocia, in the districts of Charsianon and Lykandos.

Byzantine territorial expansion and the eleventh-century incursions of Oghuz and Seljuk forces contributed to the displacement of some Armenians from the highlands. Different groups resettled in Byzantine Asia Minor, Georgia and, over subsequent generations, Cilicia. An Armenian principality eventually emerged in Cilicia during the late eleventh century and became a kingdom in 1198, but these later developments should be distinguished from the political history of the Bagratid kingdom itself.

== Culture and society ==
=== Government ===
The king of Bagratuni Armenia held unlimited powers and was the ultimate authority when it came to resolving questions on foreign and domestic affairs. The princes and nakharars were directly subordinate to the king and received and kept their lands only through his permission. Should certain nobles have disobeyed the king's orders, he would have the right to confiscate their lands and distribute them to other nobles. The concept of divine right, however, did not exist and insubordination by the nakharar elite could only be matched by the steadfastness of the king himself.

==== Royal court and offices ====
The Bagratid king governed through a royal court composed of senior officers, members of the royal family, and powerful nobles. The ishkhanats ishkhan (prince of princes) supervised relations with the princely houses and played an important role in administering royal estates, finances and taxation. The sparapet, or commander-in-chief, directed the kingdom's armed forces. Early Bagratid kings frequently entrusted the latter office to members of the dynasty: Ashot I's brother Abas and Smbat I's brother Shapuh held the position. In the eleventh century the Pahlavuni family gained increasing influence in military affairs, and Vahram Pahlavuni commanded Armenian troops in the defense of Ani.

The Catholicos of All Armenians also exercised judicial and political influence. Disputes could be adjudicated with reference to ecclesiastical canons and customary law, while the king's support remained important in the appointment of the catholicos. The monarchy therefore rested on cooperation—and sometimes competition—between the royal court, the hereditary nobility and the ecclesiastical hierarchy.

==== Royal titles and regional supremacy ====
Alongside the title of king of Armenia, Bagratid rulers employed expressions of supremacy over other rulers, including shahanshah (king of kings). Byzantine sources used the designation archon of archons. Such titles reflected the position the Ani dynasty claimed among Armenian principalities and neighboring rulers, rather than direct and uniform administration over every territory concerned. Constantine VII Porphyrogenitus described Ashot I's authority in eastern territories in his treatise De Administrando Imperio; the Armenian historian and catholicos Hovhannes Draskhanakerttsi likewise portrayed Smbat I as a pre-eminent ruler of the East.

==== Land tenure and noble houses ====
Landholding was shaped by hereditary rights and the continuing importance of noble lineages. Large family estates could pass through the senior members of a house, rather than functioning simply as grants to individual officials. The Armenian term hayrenik designated hereditary landed property. Local princes retained extensive powers in their districts, including control over dependents and their own military contingents, even while acknowledging the Bagratid sovereign. The existence of such entrenched rights could strengthen the monarchy through alliances, but it also limited the reach of central royal administration.

=== Religion ===
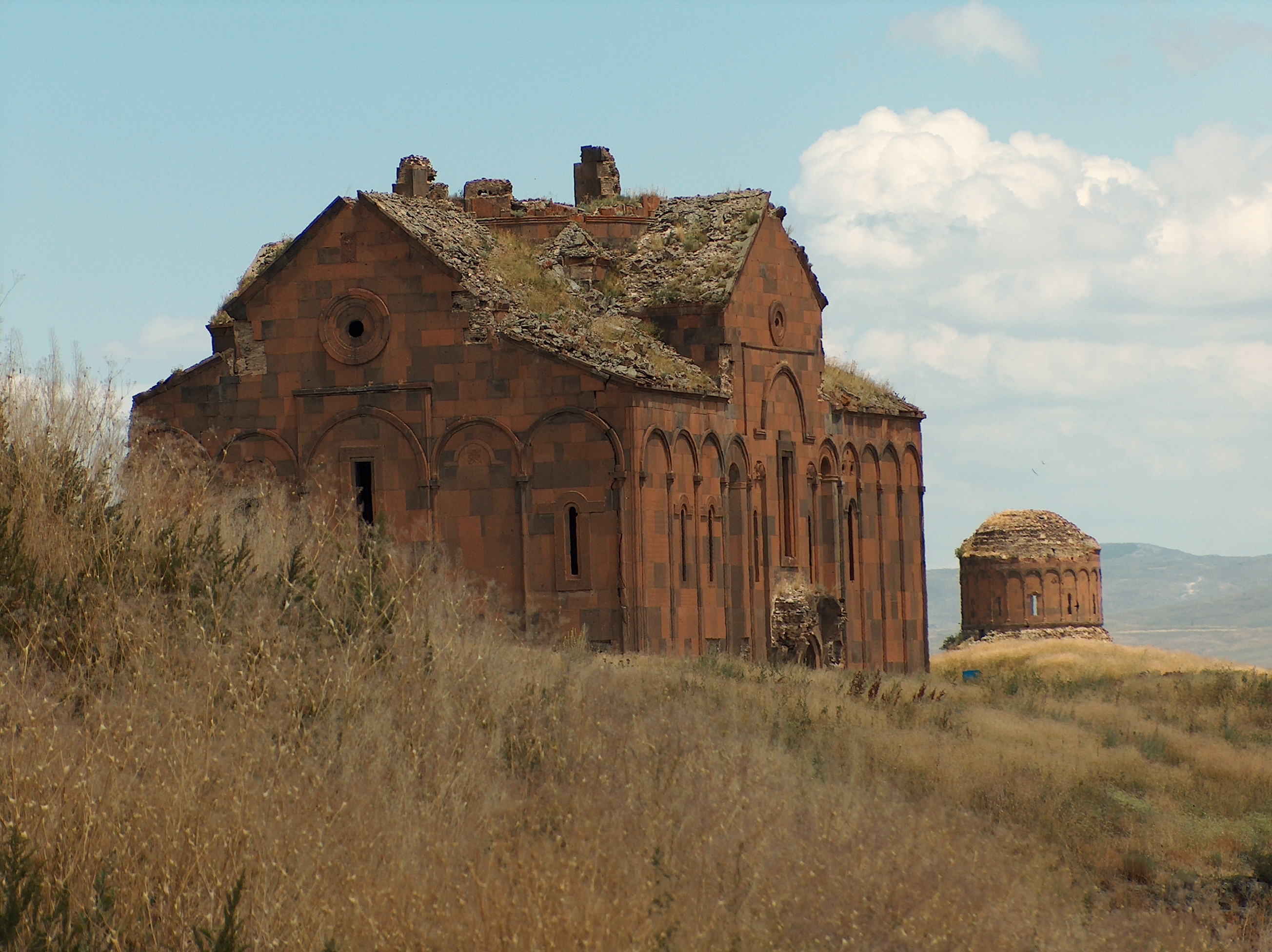
The Cathedral of Ani, completed in 1001 by Trdat the Architect

Most Armenians belonged to the Armenian Apostolic Church, but there were elements in Armenian society who also adhered to the Eastern Orthodox Church, the official religion of the Byzantine Empire. Byzantium repeatedly demanded for communion with the Armenian Church as prerequisite for sending aid to the Bagratunis but most attempts failed to bear any fruit.

In the mid-10th century, a new internal challenge to the authority of the Armenian Church and the kingdom arose when the Tondrakians experienced a revival. An anti-feudal and heretical Christian sect that had been crushed by the Arabs with the Armenian Church's support in the 9th century, the Tondrakian movement attracted many followers during this period. Ashot III had realized the danger the Tondrakians posed against the kingdom and this was of his reasons why he directly subjected the Church to him, gave it lands, and sponsored the construction of new monasteries and churches. The message of the Tondrakians, however, continued to spread and successive Armenian kings would work to suppress its expansion.

=== Economy ===
The Bagratuni kingdom was based on essentially two economies: one which was centered around agriculture based on feudalism and the other which was concentrated on mercantilism in towns and cities. Peasants (known as ramiks) formed the lowest class in the economic stratum and largely busied themselves with raising livestock and farming. Many of them did not own land, and lived as tenants and worked as hired hands or even slaves on the lands owned by wealthy feudal magnates. Peasants were forced to pay heavy taxes to the government and the Armenian Apostolic Church in addition to their feudal lords. Most peasants remained poor and the massive tax burden they shouldered sometimes culminated in peasant uprisings which the state was forced to put down.

The Bagratuni kingdom did not mint any of its own coins, and used the currency found in Byzantium and the Arab Caliphate. The expanded trade between Byzantium and the Caliphate established several trades routes which ran across Armenia. The most important route began from Trebizond, in Byzantium, and from there it connected to the cities of Ani, Kars, and Artsn. The city of Kars allowed trade to move north, to ports on the Black Sea and to Abkhazia; other routes were connected to cities in Anatolia and Iran; and the main route leading from the Caliphate to Kievan Rus was known as the "Great Armenian Highway." Ani did not lie along any previously important trade routes, but because of its size, power, and wealth it became an important trading hub. From Ani, Armenia exported textiles, metalwork, armor, jewelry, horses, cattle, salt, wine, honey, timber, leather, and furs. Its primary trading partners were the Byzantine Empire, the Arabs but also traded with Kievan Rus and Central Asia. Armenian-populated Dvin remained an important city on par with Ani, as evidenced in a vivid description by the Arab historian and geographer al-Mukadasi:

Dabil [Dvin] is an important city, in it are an inaccessible citadel and great riches. Its name is ancient, its cloth is famous, its river is abundant, it is surrounded by gardens. The city has suburbs, its fortress is reliable, its squares are cross-shaped, its fields are wonderful. The main mosque is on a hill and next to the mosque is the church....By the city is a citadel. The buildings of the inhabitants are made of clay or stone. The city has main gates such as Bab ['Gate']-Keydar, Bab-Tiflis and Bab-Ani.

Dvin became famous throughout the Arab world for its wool and silk production and the export of pillows, rugs, curtains and covers. A village named Artashat near Dvin was so prominent a center for the production of Armenian cochineal that it received the name vordan karmiri gyugh ("red-worm village") for the distinctive red dye that was derived from insects. Cochineal and other Armenian goods were extensively found throughout the caliphate and for their eminence were referred to by Arabs as "asfin al-Armani" ("Armenian products").

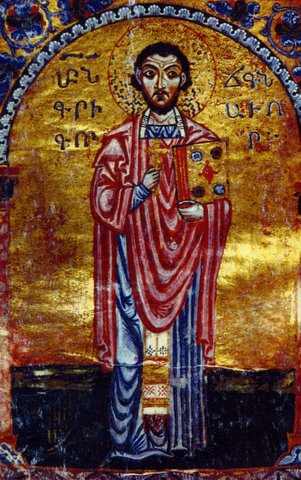
A portrait of Grigor Narekatsi from an 1173 illuminated manuscript

=== Demographics ===
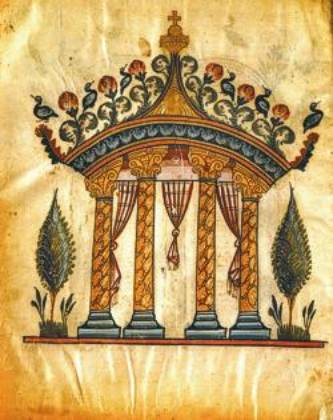
An illuminated manuscript from the Echmiadzin Gospels completed in 989

During the Bagratuni period, the great majority of the population of Armenia remained Armenian. 10th-century Arab sources attest that the cities of the Araxes valley remained predominantly Armenian and Christian despite Arab Muslim rule. In fact, the 10th-century Arab geographer Ibn Hawqal specified that Armenian was used in Dvin and Nakhichevan. Regardless, there was a notable Muslim presence in certain regions of Armenia. For instance, the southern region of Aghdznik was heavily Arabized since earlier periods of Muslim dominance. On the north shore of Lake Van in the ninth and tenth centuries, there was also a considerable Muslim population that consisted of ethnic Arabs, and later Dailamites from Azerbaijan.

=== Art and literature ===
The Arab raids and invasion of Armenia as well as the devastation wrought upon the land during the Byzantine-Arab wars had largely stifled any expression of Armenian culture in fields such as historiography, literature and architecture. These restrictions disappeared when the Bagratuni kingdom was established, ushering in a new golden age of Armenian culture.

The lack of a strong Arab presence saw a rise in the number of historians, who wrote and documented the relations between Armenia and other countries and described many events that took place from the seventh to eleventh centuries. Thanks to the patronage of the kings and nobles, monasteries became centers for the study and writing of literature throughout the kingdom. The monasteries of Haghpat and Sanahin were well-known centers for higher learning. Notable figures in Armenian literature and philosophy during this period included the mystic Grigor Narekatsi and Grigor Magistros.

The art of illuminated manuscripts and miniatures illustrations were also revived during this era. The relative period of peace between Byzantium and Armenia during the second half of the 10th century led to a great deal of interaction between Armenian artists and their Greek counterparts. Armenian manuscript authors tended either to stress the natural look of the human body in illustrations or to forgo it and instead concentrate on the aspect of decoration.

Armenian architecture during the Bagratuni era was especially prominent and "most of the surviving churches in present-day Armenia are from this period." The city of Ani, situated on the important trade intersection between the Byzantines, Arabs, and merchants of other countries, grew throughout the 9th century both commercially and culturally, earning renown for its "40 gates and 1,001 churches." The churches of this period expanded on 7th century designs; they were often steeper in elevation, introduced donor portraits in the round and incorporated ideas from Byzantine and Islamic architecture. Armenian churches were invariably built out of stone and had vaulted ceilings which supported a spherical dome. Many churches and other forms of architecture suffered vandalism or outright destruction following the Seljuk invasions of the eleventh and twelfth centuries.

== See also ==
- Bagrationi dynasty
- Kingdom of Georgia
- Kingdom of Tashir-Dzoraget
- Kingdom of the Iberians

== Sources ==
- Grousset, René. Histoire de l'Arménie: des origines à 1071. Paris: Payot, 1947. (in French)
- Jones, Lynn (2007). Between Islam and Byzantium: Aght'amar and the Visual Construction of Medieval Armenian Rulership. Routledge.
- Toumanoff, Cyril. "Armenia and Georgia." Cambridge Medieval History. vol. vi: part 1. Cambridge: Cambridge University Press, 1966.
- Yuzbashyan, Karen. N. Армянские государства эпохи Багратидов и Византия, IX-XI вв (The Armenian State in the Bagratuni and Byzantine Period, 9th-11th centuries). Moscow, 1988. (in Russian)
