= Battle of Dzknavachar =

Battle of Dzkhnavachar
Date	910
Location	Nig, Armenia

Belligerents
Bagratid Kingdom of Armenia	Sajid dynasty

Commanders and leaders
Ashot II, Mushegh Bagratuni	Yusuf ibn Abi'l-Saj, Gagik Arcruni

The Battle of Dzknavachar (Armenian: Ձկնավաճառի ճակատամարտ) was a military confrontation between the Kingdom of Bagratid Armenia and the Sajid dynasty. It took place in 910 at Dzknavachar, in the canton of Nig.

Yusuf, the emir of the Sajid dynasty, received support from Abbasid Caliphate and the assistance of the Kingdom of Vaspurakan, ruled by the Artsruni dynasty.During the Bagratid period, Vaspurakan emerged as one of the most powerful subordinate Armenian kingdoms.

== Background ==
The conflict between Smbat I and the Sajid dynasty had begun several years before the battle of Dzknavachar. As early as 897, following one of the wars against Afshin, the Sajid emir, Smbat I was forced to hand over his son Ashot as a hostage.As a result,Ashot could not be appointed as ishkhanats ishkhan (Prince of Princes of Armenia). In 899, Smbat I crowned Adarnase, the curopalate of Klarjeti, as the King of the Georgians (899–923). Afshin subsequently appears to have launched another campaign against Armenia in 900. After ravaging Armenia and Iberia for some time, he returned to Azerbaijan, leaving his chief eunuch in Dvin.

In 901, Afshin left Armenia, returning Smbat I’s son Ashot and the wife of his other son, Mushegh, who had been held hostage. It is believed that their return took place without Afshin’s consent, which prompted his new campaign against Armenia in 901. However, Afshin suddenly died on the way, and his successor, Yusuf, continued the war against Smbat I. In 903, Yusuf again waged war against Smbat I, but a peace agreement was soon concluded between the two sides. Following the peace, Yusuf bestowed royal honors upon Smbat I and appointed his eldest son, Ashot, as ishkhanats Ishkhan (Prince of Princes of Armenia), thereby recognizing his right to succeed to the throne.

At that time, the internal situation of the Bagratid Kingdom was further complicated by territorial disputes between the Siuni and Artsruni dynasties. The main subject of the dispute was the city of Nakhchavan, which both princely houses claimed. Smbat I had granted Nakhchavan to the Siunis, provoking the dissatisfaction of Gagik Artsruni. Yusuf sought to exploit these divisions by encouraging Gagik to oppose Smbat I and challenging the authority of the Bagratid central government.

The events that took place in Vaspurakan between 904 and 906 further exacerbated the existing political tension between the Bagratuni and Artsruni dynasties. The situation was further complicated by internal discord within the Artsruni princely house—specifically between Gagik Artsruni and his brother, Gurgen. Yusuf, the emir of the Sajid dynasty, sought to exploit these divisions and encourage opposition to Smbat I among the Artsruni princes.In an effort to prevent the secession of Vaspurakan and improve relations with the Artsrunis, Smbat I made several political concessions.

He proclaimed Gagik Artsruni Zoravar Hayots Metsats (“Commander of the Great Armenians”), granting him the right to carry the cross-banner at the head of the army.This placed Gagik in a military position subordinate to the king’s brother, Shapuh Sparapet. Meanwhile, Gagik’s brother Gurgen was granted the title of marzpan Hayots (“Marzpan of Armenia”), meaning that he was to be subordinate to the king’s other brother, the Ishkhanats Ishkhan (“Prince of Princes”).Through these appointments, the king sought to strengthen the Artsrunis’ ties with the central authority and prevent a possible alliance between them and Yusuf. However, the political concessions did not resolve the tensions, and relations between the Bagratids and the Artsrunis continued to deteriorate.

In 908, Yusuf recognized Gagik Artsruni as King of Vaspurakan, positioning him against Smbat I. Gagik’s coronation took place under Yusuf’s patronage. This led to the establishment of a separate Armenian kingdom under the Artsruni dynasty, outside the direct authority of the Bagratid king.The separation of Vaspurakan weakened the political unity ot the Bagratid Kingdom and provided Yusuf with an opportunity to use Armenian princely forces against Smbat I.

Before the secession of Vaspurakan, Yusuf had obtained permission from the caliph to collect taxes, provided him with an additional means of intervening in Armenia’s internal affairs. After obtaining this authority, Yusuf came to Armenia and threatened the Armenian king Smbat I with war unless he paid the taxes owed to the caliph. Smbat, who was not prepared to wage war against the Abbasid Caliphate, agreed to Yusuf’s demands and sent Catholicos Hovhannes Draskhanakertts to negotiate with Yusuf. However, the Catholicos’s mediation proved unsuccessful for the Armenians, and Yusuf had him imprisoned in chains.

In the spring of 909, while the Armenians were celebrating Easter, Yusuf launched a new campaign against Armenia. His troops invaded territories of the Bagratid Kingdom of Armenia, devastating and plundering settlements. Yusuf sought to win over individual Armenian princes to his side and use them against Smbat I.These military operations were directed against the authority of Smbat I. Of particular importance to Yusuf was the surrender of Ashot, the commander-in-chief of the Armenian forces, as his defection deprived Smbat I of an important military commander. Following Ashot’s surrender, Yusuf released Hovhannes Draskhanakerttsi from prison.

The importance Yusuf attached to Ashot’s surrender is also mentioned by the historian Leo:

«The king of Atropatene considered the surrender of Ashot, the commander-in-chief of the Armenian forces, to be of great importance in striking a blow against Smbat. Perhaps it was the sense of satisfaction he derived from this event that prompted him to release Catholicos Hovhannes from prison and chains. The suffering spiritual leader did not remain in Dvin, where his seat was located, but went into exile, wandering from city to city until he reached the northeastern part of Caucasian Albania, near the Caucasus Mountains, where he was received hospitably by Prince Sahak and King Atrnerseh. “For,” he says, “they too were from our people and belonged to the flock of our pasture.” — Leo, History of Armenia, Volume II, p. 543.»

In the spring of 910, Yusuf resumed military operations against Armenia. His campaign was also supported by the Artsruni princes of Vaspurakan, including Gagik Artsruni, his brother Gurgen, and other Armenian nobles. Their participation added to the military difficulties faced by Smbat I, who now had to contend with both Yusuf’s forces and Armenian princely contingents allied with him. Meanwhile, King Smbat of Armenia had managed to assemble a large army.

== Battle ==
King Smbat of Armenia entrusted the command of the army to his sons, Ashot and Mushegh. The forces of Gagik (Khachik) Artsruni and other Artsruni princes confronted the troops of Ashot and Mushegh at a place called Dzknavachar (Ձկնավաճառ) in the district of Nig.The Armenians launched the initial attack; however, during the battle, a unit of Utians known as the Sevordik abandoned the Armenian army and withdrew from the battlefield. The Sevordik were inhabitants of the district of Utik who had been incorporated into the Armenian army. According to Hovhannes Draskhanakerttsi, their leader was Gevorg, the “patriarch of the Sevordik.” The chronicler explains the origin of their name by referring to their ancestor Sev, stating that «because their forefather was called Sev, his people were named Sevordik».

The chronicler specifically emphasizes that Ashot and Mushegh were unaware of the intentions of the Sevordik beforehand (“not knowing the treachery of their own troops, the inhabitants of the district of Utik, who are the Sevordik”). According to Draskhanakerttsi, their withdrawal was premeditated (“according to their deceitful plan”), and they suddenly turned their backs and withdrew from the battlefield.

«Forgetting caution, the two young princes hastened to engage in battle and launched an attack. Both displayed remarkable personal bravery and even managed to throw the opposing army into confusion, raising hopes of victory. — Leo, History of Armenia, Volume II, p. 544.»

As a result of the Sevordik’s retreat, Ashot’s army found itself in a difficult position. Since Ashot’s forces were positioned on the same side as the Sevordik, he was compelled to retreat along with them, while the enemy forces intensified their pressure (“and because Ashot’s army was on that side, he was forced to turn back with them, as the attacks of the foreign troops grew stronger and more intense”). The withdrawal of the Sevordik disrupted the formation of the Armenian army and contributed to the retreat of Ashot's forces. The Armenian army was subsequently defeated, and Smbat’s son Mushegh was taken prisoner.Yusuf ordered the execution of Mushegh and other Armenian princes who had been captured or had surrendered to him. According to Hovhannes Draskhanakerttsi, some of them were secretly poisoned.

In addition to Mushegh, other Armenian princes were executed on Yusuf’s orders. Hovhannes Draskhanakerttsi mentions Grigor, a member of the Haykazun dynasty and the nephew of Smbat I, who had surrendered to Yusuf. He, too, was given a lethal drug. His body was buried in the Church of Saint Shimon, which he had built. Another figure mentioned is the young Smbat, the nephew of Smbat I. He had voluntarily surrendered to Yusuf but was later killed, and his body was buried alongside his ancestors in the district of Daroynk.

Following the defeat, Yusuf's forces continued their military operations in Armenian territories, taking advantage of the weakened position of Smbat I. His troops advanced through various parts of Armenia.

«At this point in his History, Catholicos Hovhannes takes up his pen amid lamentations and sighs. The king of Atropatene now begins to reveal his deceitful and bloodthirsty nature in earnest. One by one, he kills the princes who have surrendered to him or fallen into his hands, poisoning them. — Leo, History of Armenia, Volume II, p. 544.»

These events were accompanied by widespread fear among the population and within Yusuf’s army. The population sought refuge in uninhabited areas of the mountains.

During these military operations, King Smbat of Armenia was confined in Kapuyt Fortress (Blue Fortress).According to Hovhannes Draskhanakerttsi, Yusuf later took Smbat with him on a campaign to capture the fortress of Yernjak. Unable to seize the fortress, Yusuf demanded that Smbat order its defenders to surrender, but the Armenian king refused to comply. According to Stepanos Orbelian, Smbat I was subsequently executed, and his body was taken to Dvin and crucified at the city gates.Historical accounts place Smbat I's execution after the siege of Yernjak, generally dating his death to 914.

== See also ==
- Battle of Sevan
- Battle of Ani
- Ashot II of Armenia
- Arab invasion of Armenia

== Sources ==
- Արման Եղիազարյան,Աշոտ Երկաթ․թագավոր Հայոց,ԵՊՀ հրատարակչություն,Երևան,2016 թ․
- Yovhannes Drasxanakertc'i,History of Armenia.Translation and Commentary by Krikor H. Maksoudian.
- Հայ Ժողովրդի Պատմություն, Հ. 3.,Հայկական ՍՍՀ գիտությունների ակադեմիայի հրատարակչություն,1976,Երևան։
- Լեո «Հայոց Պատմություն» երկրորդ հատոր։ Երևան։ «Հայաստան» հրատարակչություն,1967։
- Ստեփանոս Ասողիկ Տարոնեցի,Տիեզերական պատմություն,Երևանի համալսարանի հրատարակչություն,Երևան,2000թ․։
