= Aluchalu =

Aluchalu may refer to:

- Artsvanist, Armenia - formerly Nerkin Aluchalu
- Verkhniy Aluchalu, Armenia
