= Vanevan Monastery =

Monastery in Gegharkunik, Armenia

Vanevan Monastery Վանեվան
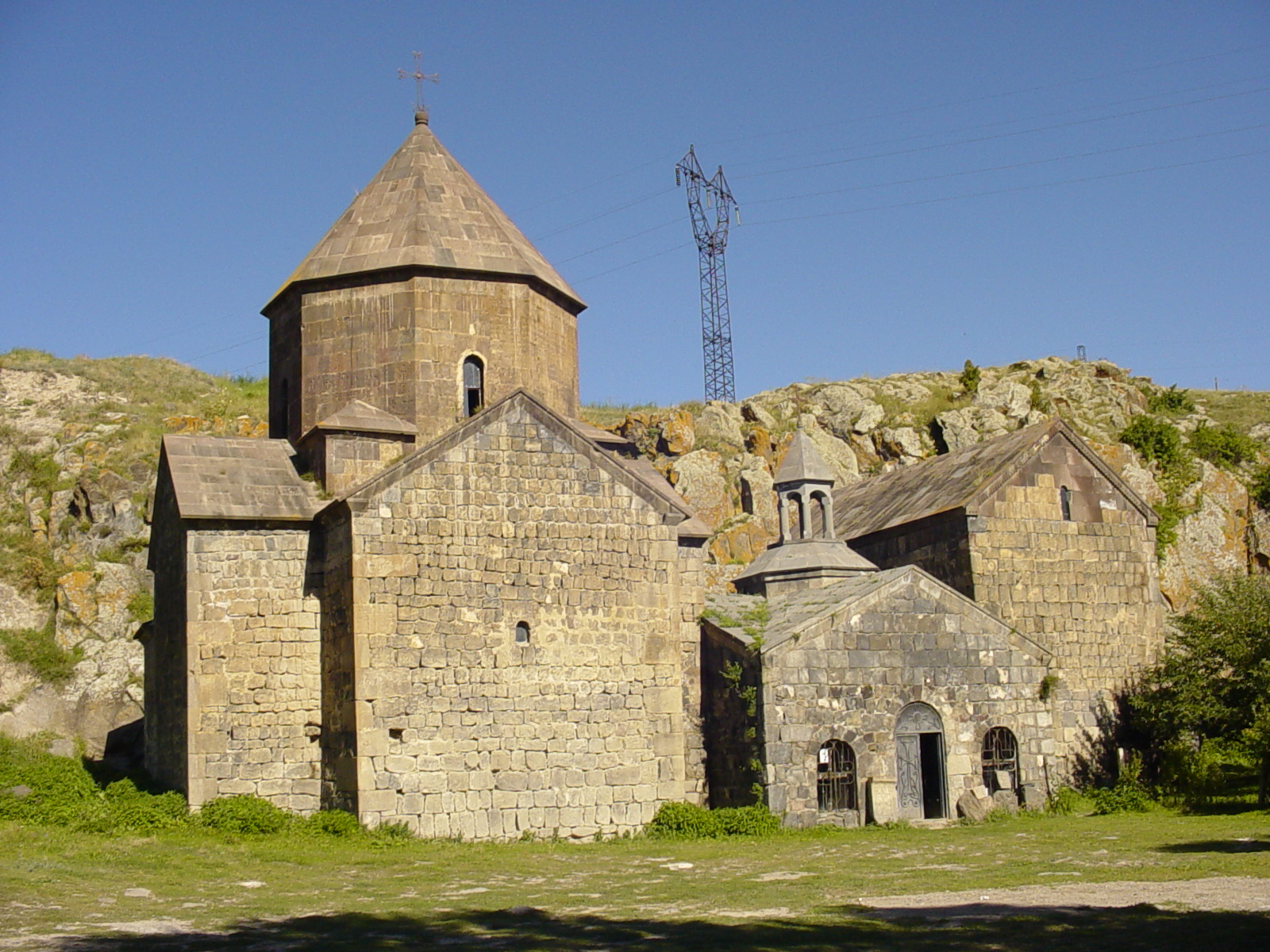
- Vanevan Monastery (Church of St. Grigor on the left).

- Location within Armenia Location within Gegharkunik

Religion
- Affiliation: Armenian Apostolic Church

Location
- Location: Artsvanist village, Gegharkunik Province, Armenia
- Coordinates: 40.146494°N 45.515513°E

Architecture
- Type: Cruciform church with four semicircular apses
- Style: Armenian
- Completed: 903
- Domes: 2 (one on the main church and a second on the church to the right that has since collapsed)

Vanevan Monastery (Armenian: Վանեվան) is a monastery located along a gorge south of the village of Artsvanist, southeast of Lake Sevan in the Gegharkunik Province of Armenia. The main church of Saint Grigor, was built in 903 by Prince Shapuh Bagratuni and his sister Mariam, siblings of King Smbat I. The church located on the southern end may have been built around the same time, while the gavit between the two was added at a later point in time. Saint Grigor was renovated and restored by King Gagik I of the Bagratid dynasty in the late 10th century. During this restoration a surrounding wall was built.

King Smbat I of Armenia was buried in Vanevan Monastery in 914.

== Architecture ==
The church has four central arches that widen progressively. An addition of a corner course between the arch bands allows this to occur. Vanevan and Tatev are the earliest such examples of this. Saint Grigor's drum is octagonal from the interior and exterior with an inscription on the latter that dates the church. The drums of both churches have an identical decorative molded band, leading to the belief that they were contemporaneous with one another. Only the dome on the main church has survived, while the drum and dome of the other have since collapsed.

Behind the monastery is a spring and cave which leads out to the top of the ravine. It is said that it was once used as an escape route from Turkish invaders. Headed east up the side of the ravine behind the monastery not too far away is a large but now broken khachkar monument. Also in the vicinity just south of Artsvanist is an early cemetery and remains of a church. Approximately three kilometers south of this is Kolataki Saint Astvatsatsin Church from the late 9th - early 10th century and Hnevank from the 10th century. Nearby is also the cyclopean fortress Bruti Berd.

== Gallery ==
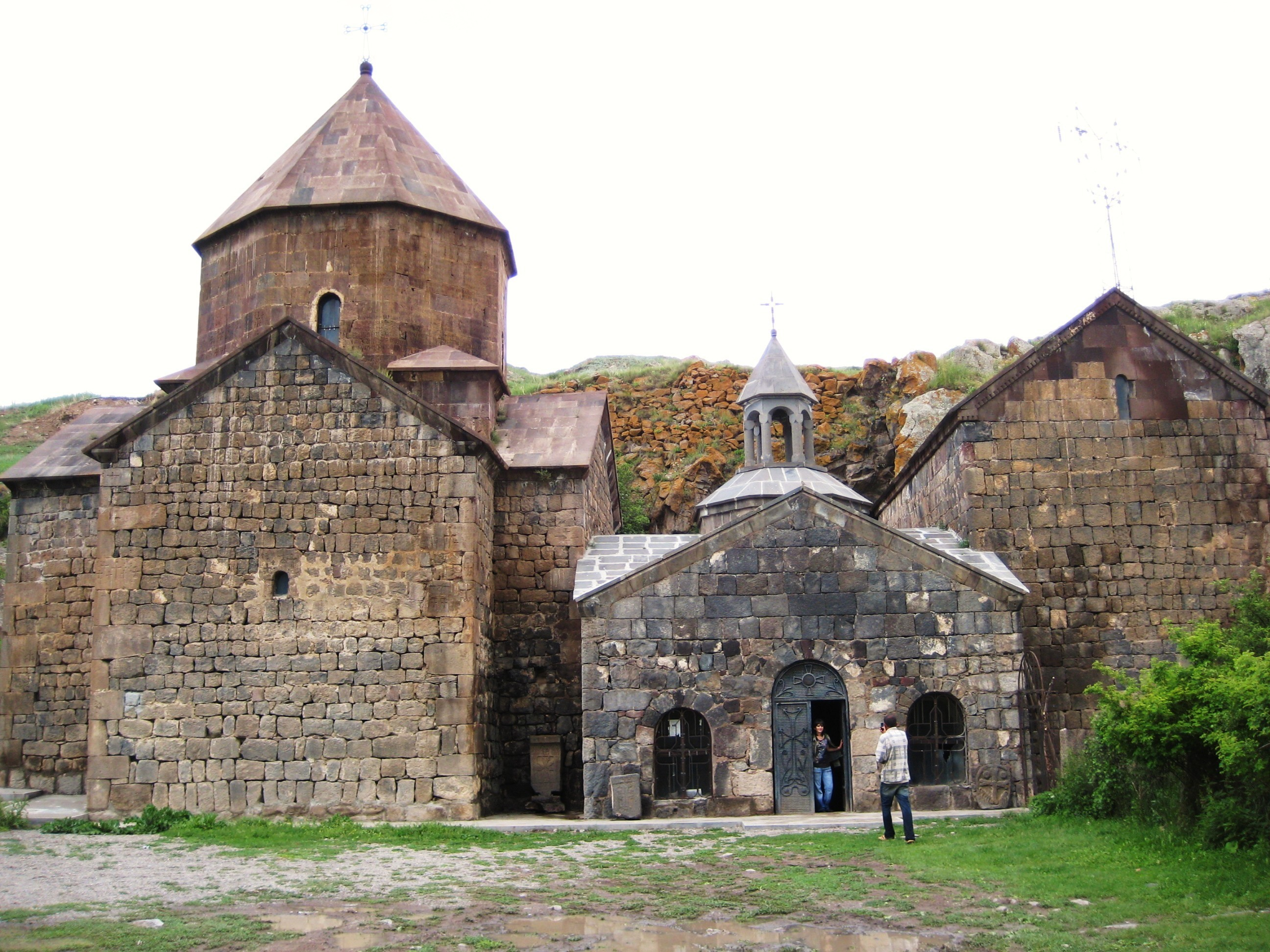
Front view of the monastery.

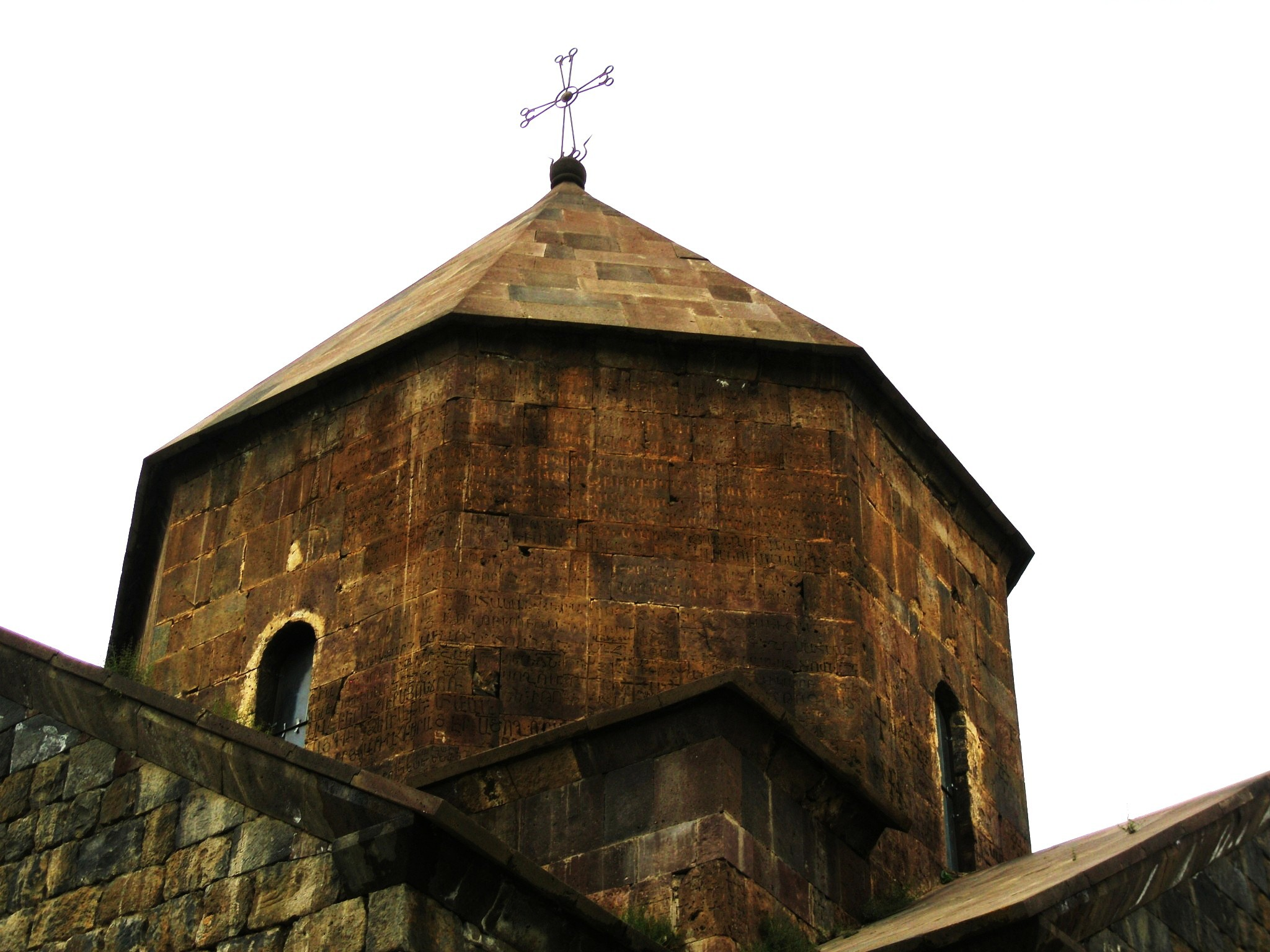
Inscriptions upon the drum.

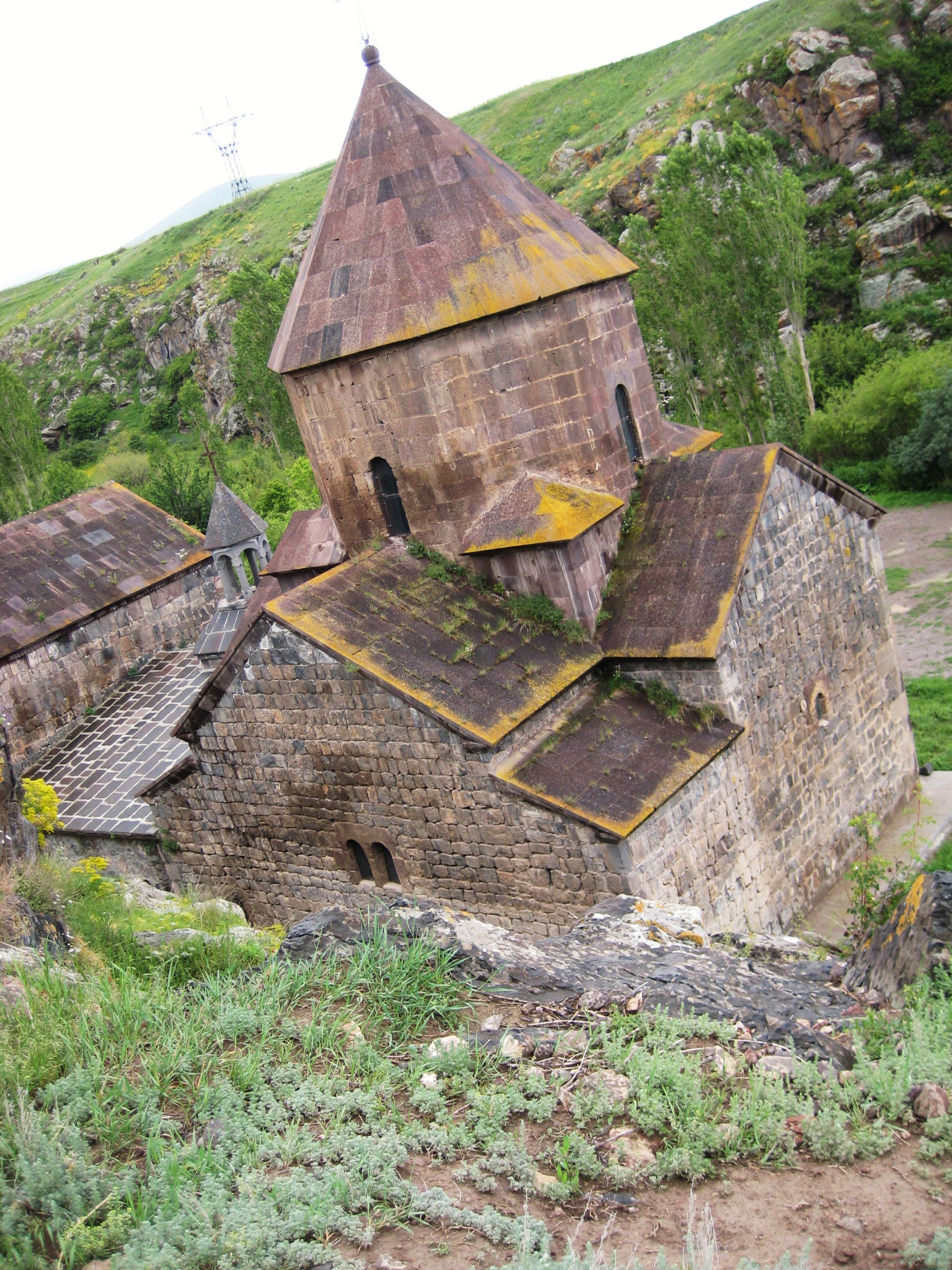
Rear side view

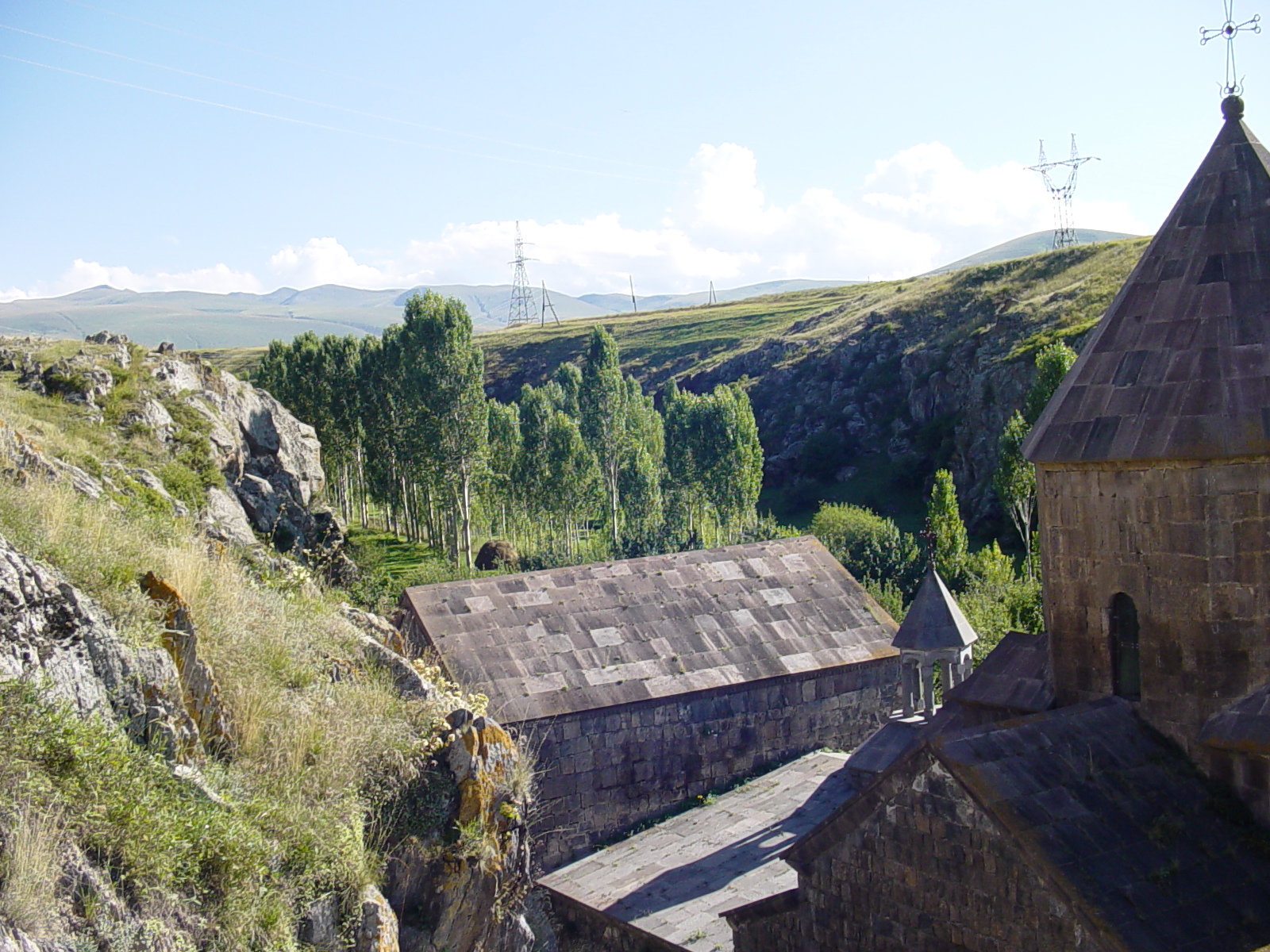
Vanevan Monastery

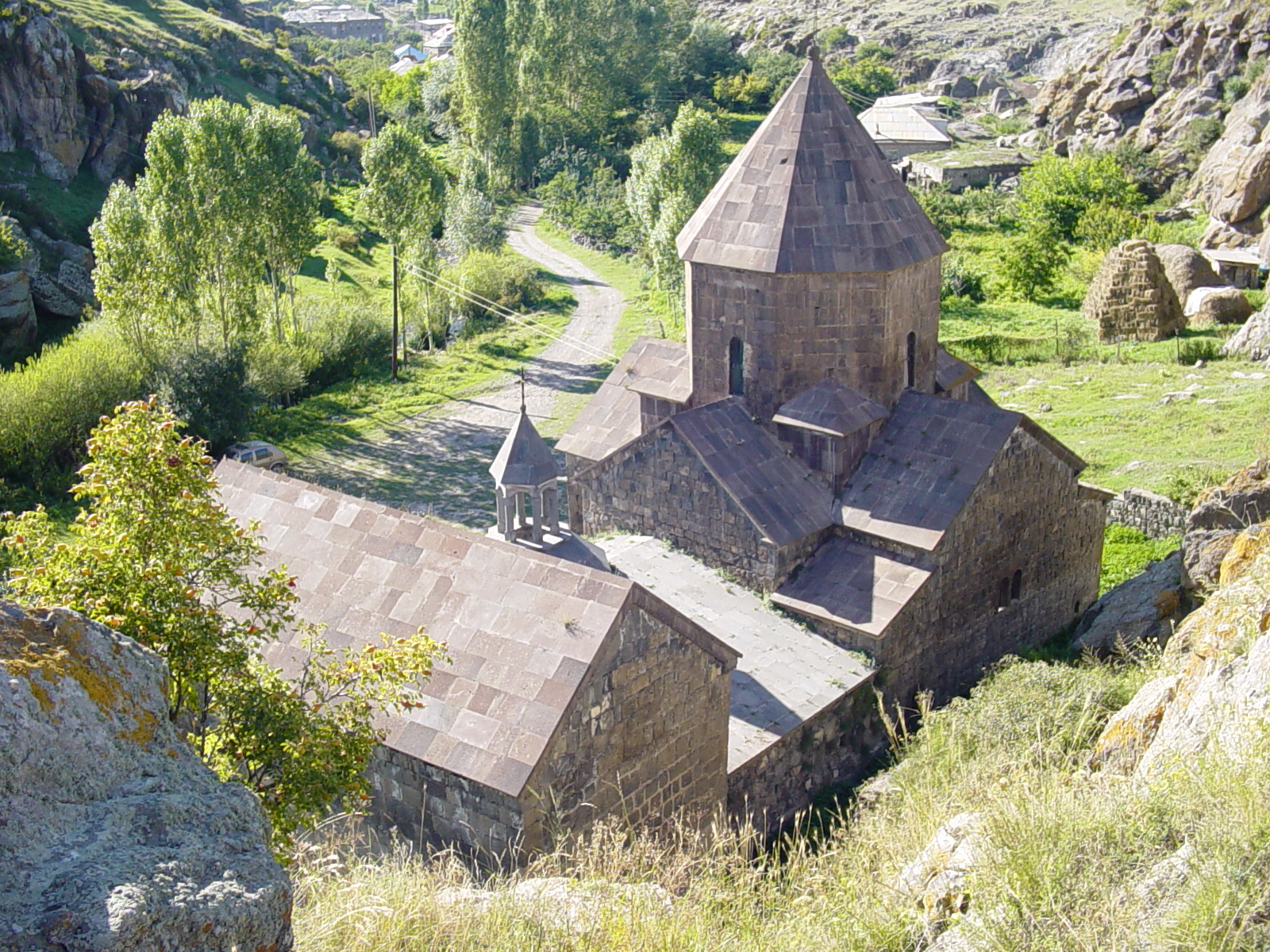
Vanevan Monastery

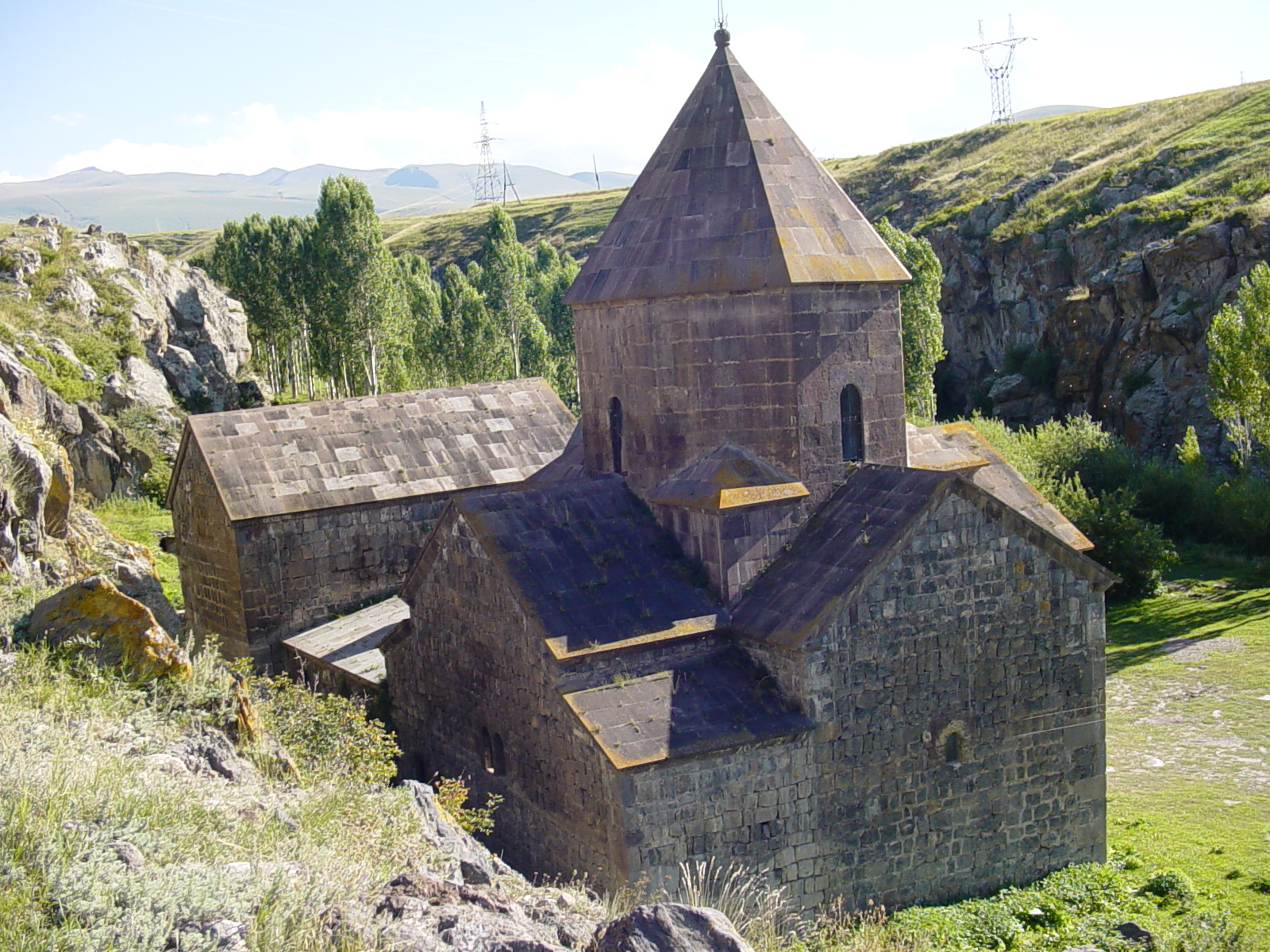
Vanevan Monastery
