= Battle of Sevan =

924 battle

Battle of Sevan Սևանի ճակատամարտ
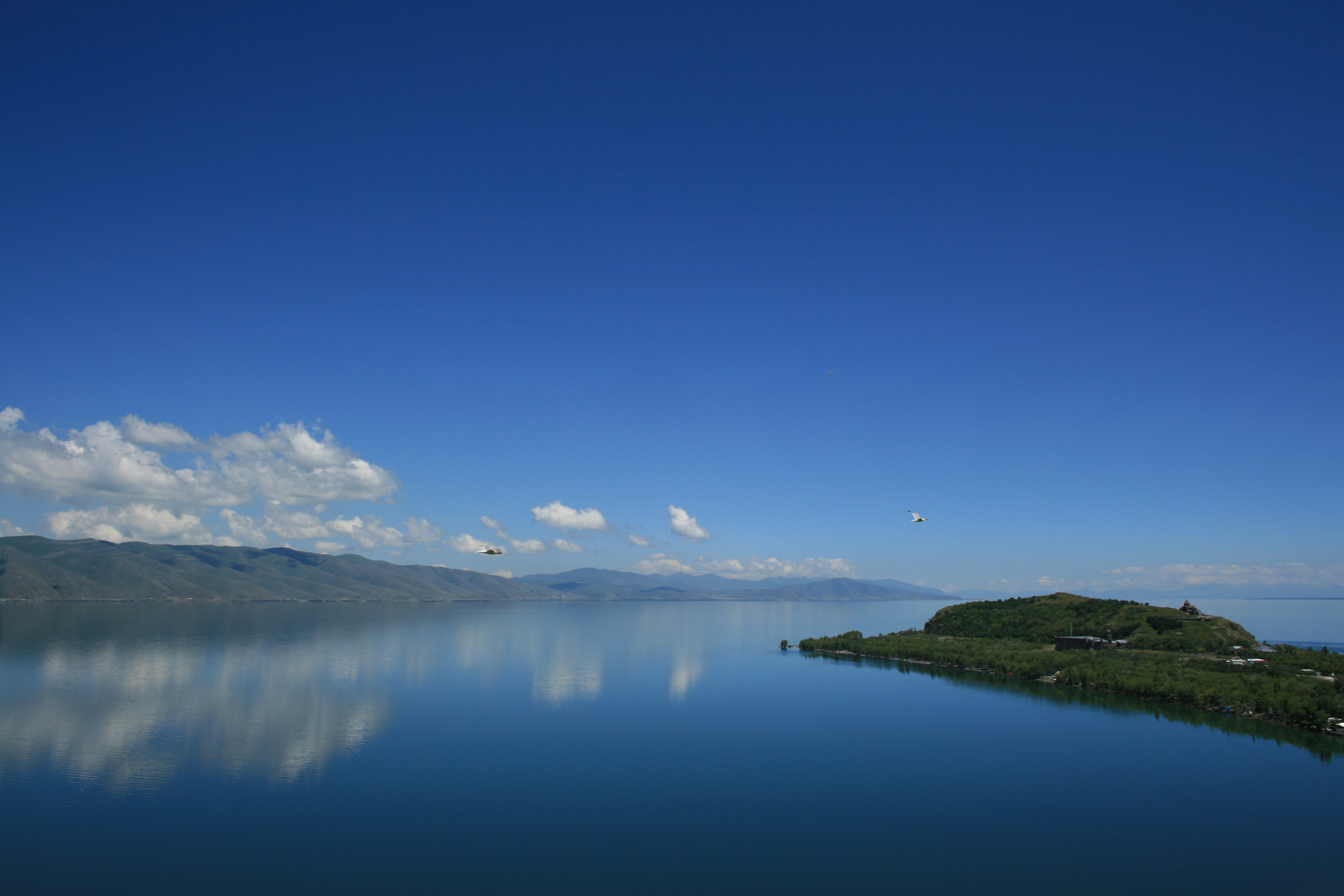
- Lake Sevan and the Sevan peninsula
Date	921
Location	North-West shore near Lake Sevan, Armenia
Result	Armenian victory

Belligerents
(Bagratuni dynasty) Kingdom of Armenia	Sajid dynasty

Commanders and leaders
(Bagratuni dynasty) Ashot the Iron	Beshir

Strength
70 archers	1,000

Casualties and losses
Light	Heavy

The Battle of Sevan (Armenian: Սևանի ճակատամարտ) was a turning point in the history of a seven-year war. After the battle, Armenian troops under the command of Ashot cleared the central and northern region of the country from foreign invaders.

== Background ==
After the restoration of his power, Yusuf has sent to Armenia, in the position of an ostikan or his deputy, someone named Nsr (Nasir), who has also been called Esruk, like the first one, who brought Ashot the title of Shahanshah, but who passed away in the city of Ardabil. This Nsr, undoubtedly executing the instructions given to him, has entered Armenia with extortions. A convenient opportunity is given by the internal situation in which the great naxarar house of Syunik has found itself at that moment. We have seen that the senior branch of that house, the one that ruled in Sisakan, has been represented by four brothers: Smbat, Sahak, Vasak, and Babgen. After the capture of Ernjak fortress, when, as we know,the mother of the four brothers and the wife of Smbat have been taken captive, at the moment of anarchy that prevailed in the Armenian world at the beginning of the reign of Ashot the Iron, this Sisakian house has returned again to its place, has seized its estates, except for Ernjak, which Yusuf has given to the Arab emir of the Goghtn district. On the other hand,Yusuf has returned to Prince Smbat his wife Sophi, who has been in Persia as a captive. But taking advantage of a convenient opportunity, perhaps Yusuf’s imprisonment, the four brothers start a war against the emir of Goghtn. However,the war has been unsuccessful, and one of the brothers, Vasak, has been killed. Subsequently, when strife has erupted between two of the remaining brothers, Babgen and Sahak, on the grounds of landed estate, perhaps the share of the slain Vasak has served as the cause. And behold, when they come from Persia to Nakhchavan (they were delayed there because of hunting), Babgen has gone to him, has complained about Sahak, has thought that thereby he could surrender that brother of his to destruction, and has seized his estate. He has summoned Sahak to him as well, has arrested both brothers,and has taken them with him in chains to Dvin. A group of people from the high class of the capital went to meet the ostikan far from the city. Nsr orders forty people from among these to be arrested as well and, loaded onto camels and mules, has taken them with him to Dvin.

These crude acts of violence are explained in a very simple way: Yusuf’s treasury, during his long imprisonment, has been emptied; it must be enriched again, and this can be done as we have already seen in Vaspurakan by collecting taxes and committing illegal extortions. Catholicos Hovhannes at that moment is located in the monastery called Ayrivank, near Garni (now Geghard). Those surrounding the Catholicos have begun to convince him to depart from there to a safer place,since the turn of violence has reached him as well and Nsr should not have deprived himself of a convenient opportunity to make the Catholicosate an object of extortions too. And the Catholicos, under the influence of general intimidation, has fulfilled the desire of those surrounding him and has gone to Sevan Island. But thinking here that the Catholicosate cannot be left to the will of the tyrant, he has resolved to give Nsr as many unnecessary valuable items as there are and thus receive permission to resettle in Dvin. With this thought, he has started negotiations, has moved to the village of Byurakan located on the slopes of Aragats, where he has built a small fortress and monastery with his own means. Nsr gives consent and has even ordered a sworn covenant to be written. But one of the Islamic clerics has convinced him not to make any concession to the Catholicos and to form an entire troop to catch him. That troop first has attacked Ayrivank,has plundered-devastated it, has slaughtered the congregation, and has brought the plunder to Nsr. Upon receiving this news, Catholicos Hovhannes has abandoned Byurakan and has fled to Bagaran, the royal seat of the Bagratunis, where Ashot Shapuhyan was living at that time. Meanwhile, Byurakan has been subjected to a terrible condition. Bishop Sahak,who was with the Catholicos, has been unable to flee due to illness; the priests and deacons of the catholicosal church have remained with him. Perhaps it has these very ones who resolved to resist the Arabs, therefore they have gathered all those people present in the village who knew how to use weapons, and, with the whole village fortifying itself in the fortress, have waited for Nsr’s soldiers. These come and have besieged the fortress. The fortress inhabitants have resisted for seven days with great success.

These harsh acts of violence were explained very simply: Yusuf’s treasury, during his long imprisonment, had been emptied; it was necessary to enrich it again, and this could be done, as we have already seen in Vaspurakan, by collecting taxes and committing illegal extortions. Catholicos Hovhannes was at that time in the monastery called Ayrivank, near Garni (now Geghard). Those surrounding the Catholicos began to persuade him to leave that place for a safer location,since it would soon be his turn for violence, and Nsr would not miss a suitable opportunity to make the Catholicosate an object of plunder as well. And the Catholicos, under the influence of general terror, fulfills the desire of those around him and goes to Sevan Island. But thinking here that the Catholicosate could not be left to the mercy of the tyrant, he decides to give Nsr whatever surplus valuable items there were and thereby obtain permission to resettle in Dvin. With this thought, he begins negotiations, moving to the village of Byurakan, located on the slopes of Aragats, where he had built a small fortress and monastery with his own means. Nsr agrees and even orders a sworn treaty to be written. But one of the Islamic clerics persuades him not to make any concessions to the Catholicos and to form an entire detachment to capture him. That detachment first attacks Ayrivank, plunders and ruins it, slaughters the monks, and takes the spoils to Nsr. Upon hearing this news, Catholicos Hovhannes leaves Byurakan and flees to Bagaran, the Bagratid royal domain, where Ashot Shapuhyan was living at that time. Meanwhile, Byurakan is subjected to a terrible situation. Bishop Sahak, who was with the Catholicos, cannot flee due to illness; the priests and deacons of the Catholicosate church remain with him as well. It was probably these very people who decided to resist the Arabs, so they gathered all the men in the village who knew how to use weapons, and the whole village, fortifying themselves inside the small fortress (as the historian Catholicos himself calls it), awaits Nsr’s soldiers. They arrive and besiege the fortress. The villagers/fortress dwellers resist with great success for seven days.

But in that small environment, a few traitors have been found who have betrayed the fortress, and the enraged enemy has rushed inside, has pulled Bishop Sahak and the other clerics from their cradle/bed, has slaughtered also the defenders of the fortress and many of the villagers, amounting to about 200 people. Meanwhile, a part of the inhabitants, among whom are also women, have been driven captive to Dvin, carrying with them also the heads of the slain. However, Nsr has made an unexpected judgment: he has freed the captives and gives orders to behead those traitors who have betrayed the fortress. Those slaughtered in Byurakan, undoubtedly precisely for the reason that they are residents of the catholicosal estate, have been considered martyrs for religion, and Catholicos Hovhannes has described their murder with long details. Nsr, by order of Yusuf, has departed for Atropatene to suppress some uprising that erupted there, has temporarily handed over his post to one of the people serving under him, whose name was Bshr (Beshir). This one has made it his business to fight against Ashot the Iron. And behold, the King of the Armenians appears before us in a strange condition: he is abandoned by everyone, almost alone, has barely a hundred bodyguards with him, and is forced to shut himself on Sevan Island. The surrounding area of the lake, that is to say the entire Gegharkunik district, is ruined and desolate from enemy attacks, only miserable remnants of the population are visible here and there. What has happened—we do not know. After fleeing to Kakavaberd fortress, Ashot Shahanshah has remained hidden from the eye of history. And undoubtedly, powerful upheavals have happened in his life, which ultimately have brought and led him to this fugitive condition on a remaining tiny island. These kinds of painful gaps have occurred to us not a few times in the course of our history, thanks to the circumstance that our historians have many times been carried away by secondary and worthless details to consign the main thing to oblivion.

One way or another, Bshr has gone to conquer the Shahanshah, because, the historian says, — he did not want to submit to Yusuf’s men. But to approach the king in his refuge well-protected by waters was not easy, and Bshr was deriving satisfaction by destroying the already desolate country and attacking unarmed and peaceful people. To respond to these exploits, the Shahanshah himself was not coming out from the island, but one of the "nobles" (as Catholicos Hovhannes has named) present in his group, whose name was Gevorg, crosses to the mainland with several men and shows miracles of bravery there. He has flown back and forth, has launched lightning attacks on Bshr’s men and carries off victories with his sharp and highly daring strikes. Thus, once, having about twenty men behind him, he has met Bshr with an entire regiment, which would consist of about a thousand people. First he has pulled back, falling into doubt, but then, relying on his fearless determination, with that handful of people he has attacked so fiercely, has wielded weapons so fast and so strongly that the enemy has scattered in disorder and turned to flight, leaving many dead. Bshr, to take revenge for falling into such a laughable position, has seized about twenty innocent and unarmed people — priest, shepherd, laborer, even beggar, cuts off their heads and has carried them as signs of victory. The second time, the ostikan comes out against the Shahanshah with more serious preparation: he has besieged Sevan Island from the western shore of the lake, has cut off its communication with the mainland, having the objective to capture the king remaining there without fail. Ashot has answered him with a very major deed of valiant bravery, which has had a huge moral effect on the besiegers. He has prepared eleven boats, seats in them 70 of the most select and trained archers, whose arrows do not miss even by a hair, as Catholicos Hovhannes has said. Himself also going at the head of these archers — comes out against them to war. A kind of naval war, which, it must be thought, is not so usual a phenomenon in Armenian reality. Our boats have started a fierce archery. As it has appeared, the Armenians have targeted mostly the eyes of Bshr’s men, because, according to the historian, many of them have died, and many have received deep wounds. And the enemy, being unable to resist the deadly shower raining from the sea, terrified has left everything and fled. On the way, he has thought to take by surprise the fortress named Gega and capture it, to replace this failure he suffered. But by his luck, accidentally that brave Gevorg has entered that fortress. And behold, with his small group he comes out of the fortress and has powerfully attacked the large crowd. Himself single-handedly dueling, has reached Bshr, has broken the legs of his horse. The ostikan has barely been able to sit on another horse and flee.

At that moment, Nsr has returned from Persia and has assumed his office again. Nsr too has marched against Prince Smbat of Syunik. However, Smbat does not get caught by surprise, but has brought out enough cavalry and infantry troops for the defense of his country. Nsr, seeing that it should be difficult to wage war operations in the created conditions, has considered it more profitable to resort to peace, to which Smbat too gives consent. One of the conditions also has been that Nsr was to release the imprisoned Sahak and Babgen, but has received a ransom from them. And so, the entire effort of Yusuf’s representatives was — to plunder, snatch, and extort as much as possible. Nsr has acted mercilessly especially with the Catholicosate of All Armenia. After the battle of Byurakan, he has seized the entire building of the Catholicosate in Dvin, as well as all the villages belonging to it. Catholicos Hovhannes, finding no remedy of help, has remained sheltered near Ashot Shapuhyan.

== History ==
The uprising begun by the people for freedom in Armenia was gradually expanding. At that time, an uprising had also begun in Atropatene, and Nsr, by Yusuf's order, leaves for that place, leaving his position to Beshir. At that time, the Armenian King Ashot II the Iron had shut himself up on the Island of Sevan.

— The surroundings of the lake, the entire Gegharkunik province, are devastated and desolate from the enemy attacks; only pitiful remnants of the population can be seen here and there. What happened—we do not know. After fleeing Kakavakar fortress, Ashot Shahanshah remained hidden from the eye of history. And undoubtedly, mighty upheavals had occurred in his life, which ultimately brought him to this plight of a fugitive remaining on a tiny island. Leo, "History of Armenia", Volume Two, page 568

Beshir made the decision to defeat the future Shahanshah of the Armenians. Catholicos Hovhannes writes in his work:

Beshir did not want to submit to Yusuf's men. But approaching the King in his shelter well-protected by waters was not easy, and Beshir derived satisfaction from ruining the already devastated land and attacking unarmed and peaceful people. To respond to these exploits, Shahanshah himself did not leave the island, but one of the honorable ones in his group, whose name was Gevorg, crossed to the mainland with a few men and displayed wonders of personal bravery.

== Siege ==
The second time, the ostikan comes out against the Armenian King Ashot more seriously, besieging Sevan Island from the eastern shore of the lake. The Armenian King prepares 11 boats and 70 archers who, as Catholicos Hovhannes notes, "did not miss even by a hair's breadth." Ashot, leading the archers, begins a naval war. Hovhannes Draskhanakerttsi wrote about this attack:

The Armenians aimed mostly at the eyes of Beshir's men, because many of them remained one-eyed, and many received deep wounds. And the enemy, unable to resist the deadly shower pouring from the lake, leaves everything in terror and flees.

Yusuf, who had received information that Ashot had retired on the island of Sevan, then sent Nusir, a chief to capture Ashot the king. Nusir made it to Duin, where he captured several people. Later Nusir was succeeded by Beshir, a chief who took his place. Beshir then sent 1,000 of his men to attack the island and capture the king. Beshir was met by George the Marzbedunian. With his small army, they attacked Beshir's army, and killed the enemy in great numbers, which had caused them to flee. Beshir did not expect this defeat. He then gathered more troops and went after George the Marzbedunian. He failed to capture him. Beshir approached Lake Sevan. Ashot prepared ten boats, where he placed archers with great skills with the bow. It was said for each arrow was shot with such precision that it never missed killing or wounding its target. Beshir's army ultimately fled in defeat. After the defeat, Ostikan Beshir decided to capture Gegha fortress, but Gevorg Marzpetuni was located there at that time.During the battle, Beshir suffers a defeat, but manages to escape. After the Battle of Sevan, the Emirate of Atropatene and the Arab Caliphate came to terms with the independence of Armenia.

Gagik Artsruni, who had been the cause of internal political turmoil and had become the King of Vaspurakan, accepted the suzerainty of the Armenian Bagratunis. Ashot the Iron went to Constantinople to renew the Armenian-Byzantine alliance treaty. He began to engage in peaceful construction work, centralization of the state, and reorganization of the army.

== Bibliography ==
- Լեո «Հայոց Պատմություն» երկրորդ հատոր։ Երևան։ «Հայաստան» հրատարակչություն։ 1967։ էջ 567-569
- Հ․ Գ․ Ժամկոչյան, Ա․ Գ․ Աբրահամյան, Ս․ Տ․ Մելիք-Բախշյան, Ս․ Պ․ Պողոսյան «Հայ ժողովրդի պատմություն․ սկզբից մինչև XVIII դարի վերջ», էջ 425-426
- Դրասխանակերտցի, Հովհաննես – Պատմութիւն Հայոց, Թիֆլիս, 1912:
- Դրասխանակերտցի, Հովհաննես – Պատմութիւն Հայոց, ԵՊՀ Հրատարակչություն, Երևան, 1985 (հրատ.՝ Մ. Խաչատրյան):
- Դրասխանակերտցի, Հովհաննես – Պատմութիւն Հայոց, «Մատենագիրք Հայոց», ԺԱ. հատոր, Ժ. դար, Պատմագրութիւն, Անթիլիաս-Լիբանան, 2010:
- Չամչյան, Միքայել – Պատմութիւն Հայոց, հատոր Գ, Վենետիկ, 1786:
