= Smbat I of Armenia =

King of Armenia c. 890–914

Smbat I Սմբատ Ա
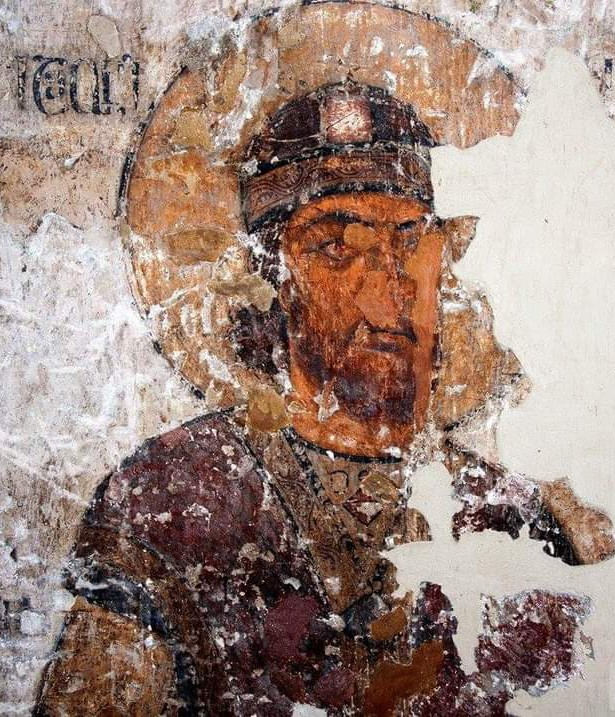
- Smbat I fresco at Ateni Sioni church in Georgia

King of Armenia
- Reign: c. 890-914
- Predecessor: Ashot I
- Successor: Ashot II
- Born: c. 850
- Died: c. 914; Yernjak
- Burial: Artsvanist (?)
- Issue: Ashot II; Abas I
- Dynasty: Bagratuni
- Father: Ashot I
- Mother: Katranide
- Religion: Armenian Apostolic Church

Smbat I (Armenian: Սմբատ Ա; c. 850–912/14), sometimes called Smbat the Martyr (Armenian: Սմբատ Ա Նահատակ) was the second king of the medieval Kingdom of Armenia of the Bagratuni dynasty, and son of Ashot I. He was the father of Ashot II and Abas I. He inherited the Armenian throne in 890, but his rule was firmly established only in 892. After the death of Ashot I, the Armenian throne passed to Smbat according to the principle of seniority. However, Ashot I’s brother, Abas Sparapet (Commander-in-Chief), also claimed the throne. As a result, a struggle for succession broke out, leading to internal conflicts that developed into civil wars. Eventually, Smbat defeated his uncle and secured the Armenian throne in 892. In the same year, Smbat’s authority was officially recognized by the Arab Caliphate. Also in 892, he captured Dvin, the last Arab stronghold in Armenia. He incorporated the provinces of Tayk, Taron, Arzanene, Upper Armenia (Bardzr Hayk), and the Javakhk district of Gugark into the kingdom. According to the historian Hovhannes Draskhanakerttsi, during Smbat’s reign the borders of Armenia extended east to Atropatene (Adurbadagan), west to the Euphrates River, north to Georgia, and south to the Taurus Mountains.

Smbat, continuing his father’s policy, concluded a treaty with the Byzantine Empire in 893, during the reign of Leo VI. The treaty was primarily a commercial agreement that played an important role in the economic development of Bagratid Armenia. At the same time, it also served as an alliance and a treaty of friendship. At that time, Afshin, the ruler of the Sajid emirate of Azerbaijan, had been appointed governor of Armenia. Unable to accept the growing Armenian-Byzantine rapprochement, he invaded Armenia with his army. However, Smbat I resolved the situation through diplomacy, and Afshin withdrew to Azerbaijan.

In 894, a devastating earthquake struck Armenia, leaving the capital Dvin half-ruined and defenseless. Approximately 70,000 people lost their lives in the disaster. Taking advantage of these favorable circumstances, Afshin gathered another army and invaded Armenia once again. The battle took place near the village of Doghs in the district of Aragatsotn, where Afshin’s forces suffered a crushing defeat and were compelled to seek peace from Smbat. A brief period of peace was established in Armenia, which Smbat used to strengthen and centralize the state. He launched campaigns into Gugark, which had been occupied by the Georgians, and reunified it with Armenia. In 899, Smbat crowned the Georgian prince Adarnase Bagratuni as King of Georgia, seeking to align Iberia with the interests of the Armenian kingdom. In 901, Afshin was succeeded by Yusuf, who invaded Armenia and captured Dvin. Smbat besieged the city and recaptured it, forcing Emir Yusuf to retreat to Atropatene. In 903, the Abkhazians began raiding Gugark and Iberia. Smbat assembled a large army, campaigned against the Kingdom of Abkhazia, conquered it, and annexed several Abkhazian districts to his kingdom, including Klarjeti and Ardahan.

Seeing that he could not defeat Smbat by military force, Yusuf resorted to cunning. At that time, internal conflicts had arisen between the Artsruni and Siuni noble houses, and Smbat had settled the dispute in favor of the Siunis. Gagik Artsruni was dissatisfied with this decision and rebelled. Yusuf seized this opportunity to sow discord among the Armenians. He immediately sent a crown to Gagik and recognized him as King of Armenia. At the same time, in 909, Yusuf invaded Armenia from Azerbaijan with his army. The decisive battle took place in 910 at Dzknavachar, where Smbat was defeated after the Sevordi princes betrayed him. At the same time, the Arab emirs in Armenia, who had previously paid tribute to Smbat, revolted. Many Armenian princes with separatist ambitions also joined the rebellion. Smbat took refuge in the Kapuyt Fortress, which Yusuf soon besieged. During the negotiations, Yusuf guaranteed Smbat’s personal safety. In order to spare the country from further devastation, Smbat surrendered. However, Yusuf broke his oath, subjected Smbat to torture, and took him to Dvin. There he attempted to force Smbat to order the defenders of the Armenian fortresses and strongholds to surrender, but Smbat refused. In 914, Yusuf had Smbat beheaded, and his body was crucified on the gates of Dvin.

== Biography ==
The Bagratid Kingdom during the Reign of Ashot the Great’s Successors In 890, Ashot I, the first king of the Bagratid Kingdom of Armenia, died. Following the principle of primogeniture, the throne passed to his eldest son, Smbat I. However, Smbat was unable to attend his father’s funeral because he was engaged in military campaigns in Gugark. After returning to Armenia and observing the customary mourning rites, he ascended the vacant Armenian throne. Smbat’s uncle, Abas Sparapet (Commander-in-Chief), also harbored ambitions for the Armenian crown. For this reason, he withdrew to the district of Vanand and waited for a favorable opportunity to rebel. The occasion arose with the visit of Adarnase Bagratuni, the Georgian prince who was heir to the Georgian throne. Adarnase first visited Abas, offering his condolences on the death of Ashot I. He then informed Abas that he also intended to visit Smbat. Abas advised him not to do so, but Adarnase assured him that he held no bias between the rival claimants to the throne and proceeded to meet Smbat. After expressing his condolences, Adarnase dressed Smbat in royal garments as a sign of recognition of his kingship. Abas interpreted this act as a betrayal. Consequently, when Adarnase returned to Abas, the latter had the Georgian prince arrested.

This incident led to a conflict between Smbat and his uncle Abas. Seeing to prevent internal strife, the Catholicos of Armenia appealed to Abas and asked him to release Adarnase. In return, Abas demanded that two fortresses, which Adarnase had previously taken from Gurgen, the husband of Abas’s sister, be restored to him. Adarnase immediately complied with this demand. Nevertheless, Abas broke his oath and continued to keep Adarnase imprisoned. Disappointed by Abas’s actions, the Catholicos turned to Smbat for assistance. Outraged by his uncle’s conduct, Smbat resumed hostilities. Realizing the superiority of Smbat’s military forces, Abas withdrew into the fortress of Kars and soon sought peace negotiations. Wishing to avoid a civil war among the Armenians, Smbat agreed to negotiate and, in exchange for peace, demanded the release of Adarnase from prison. Abas accepted this condition, and Adarnase was freed.

After the succession struggle had ended, in 892 the Abbasid Caliph al-Mu’tadid Billah sent a crown and royal robes to Smbat through Afshin, thereby formally recognizing him as King of Armenia. At the same time, Afshin was appointed governor of Armenia while also administering Atropatene. Smbat’s coronation took place in the capital, Shirakavan. Witnessing these developments, Abas once again became consumed by jealousy and began taking action against Catholicos Gevorg, who supported Smbat. He attempted to spread false accusations against the Catholicos, but his efforts proved unsuccessful.

Leo VI the Wise of the Armenian (Macedonian) Dynasty in the Byzantine Empire Smbat faithfully continued the policies of his father, Ashot I. In 893, he traveled to Byzantium and began negotiations with the imperial court in Constantinople. At that time, the Byzantine Empire was ruled by Leo VI the Wise, a representative of the Armenian (Macedonian) dynasty. A commercial treaty was concluded between Armenia and Byzantium. This agreement was of great importance not only for Byzantium and Armenia but also for the Arab Caliphate, since the Byzantine–Arab frontier was closed, preventing direct trade between the two powers. Armenia, therefore, could serve as the intermediary connecting them. However, the principal objective of the treaty was not economic cooperation but the establishment of an alliance and friendly relations. As a result, Armenia and Byzantium developed an allied relationship, although this alliance was not formally stipulated in the text of the treaty.

Afshin closely monitored these developments from Atropatene. Understanding the true nature of the Armenian–Byzantine agreement, he invaded Armenia with his army. In response, Smbat assembled an army of 30,000 men and marched to confront him. Afshin had not expected such a large military force. Smbat sent envoys to Afshin, assuring him that there was no reason for concern, since the Armenian–Byzantine treaty was merely a commercial agreement. Afshin, however, agreed to withdraw peacefully less because he trusted Smbat’s assurances than because he feared the strength of the Armenian army. Smbat then turned to one of his principal objectives: to unite all Armenian lands under a single kingdom and establish a unified Armenian state. To achieve this, he decided to capture Dvin. He laid siege to the city and spent two years attempting to conquer it. Eventually, Dvin surrendered. Smbat arrested its two Arab governors and sent them to Byzantium to Leo VI the Wise. After securing Dvin, Smbat launched a campaign to the north and brought several kingdoms located on the opposite bank of the Kura River under his authority. His rule was also extended over the Alan Gates and Kakheti.

The Armenian Kingdom was prospering rapidly when a devastating natural disaster struck—the earthquake of Dvin. The city was left half in ruins: sections of its defensive walls collapsed, numerous houses were destroyed, and approximately 70,000 people lost their lives. Taking advantage of the situation, Afshin launched another invasion of Armenia from Atropatene. Before the campaign, he deliberately spread rumors that he intended to attack other countries. However, when his army was sighted near Nakhichevan, Smbat realized his true intentions and began military preparations. By then, it was too late. Smbat withdrew as far as Aragatsotn, allowing Afshin to occupy Dvin, while concentrating his own forces in the village of Vzhan. Catholicos Gevorg attempted to negotiate with Afshin in order to stop the invasion. Afshin, however, demanded that Smbat personally come to negotiate with him. When Gevorg informed Smbat of this demand, the king immediately refused, recalling the circumstances surrounding his father’s death. The Catholicos returned to Afshin for further negotiations, but the Arab governor realized that the talks were merely an attempt to gain time and had Gevorg imprisoned. The decisive battle eventually took place near the village of Doghs in the district of Aragatsotn, where Smbat’s forces achieved victory, largely with the support of the northern mountain troops. Following his defeat, Afshin immediately sought peace negotiations, claiming that the sole reason for the war had been Smbat’s failure to pay tribute. Smbat promptly paid the required tribute to the Arabs, and Afshin, whose prestige had been damaged by his defeat, withdrew from Armenia. He took the imprisoned Catholicos with him, who was released only after a substantial ransom had been paid.

=== Political Situation in Vaspurakan ===
Having suffered defeats, Afshin had not forgotten his desire for revenge against Smbat. However, he understood that he could not achieve this revenge through military force. Therefore, he decided to use a method of deception that had often been employed by Armenia’s enemies against the Armenians. After the death of Grigor-Derenik, the guardianship of his three sons—Sargis-Ashot, Gagik, and Gurgen—was entrusted to Gagik Abu-Mrvan. Later, the province of Vaspurakan was divided into three parts, with each of the brothers beginning to rule his own territory. The area stretching from Van to Nakhchavan, along with the principality of Vaspurakan, passed to Sargis-Ashot according to the principle of seniority. The lands from Rshtunik to the region of Mokk were given to Gagik, while Persian Armenia (Parsikahayk) passed to Gurgen. However, their guardian Gagik Abu-Mrvan, who was himself a prominent member of the Artsruni family, did not want to remain excluded from this division of power. He seized the famous fortresses of Nkan, Sevan, and Kotor from the three brothers.

News of these conflicts reached Afshin. Seeking to provoke internal wars among the Armenians, he took advantage of this favorable situation. He invited Sargis-Ashot to his court. Learning that Sargis-Ashot intended to form an alliance with Afshin, Smbat sent him a letter urging him not to take such a step. However, the prince of Vaspurakan ignored Smbat’s advice and traveled to Atropatene.> Angered by the prince’s actions, Smbat divided Vaspurakan between Gurgen, the great prince of Andzevatsik, and his maternal cousin Gagik Abu-Mrvan. After learning about this, Sargis-Ashot returned to Armenia with Afshin’s troops. Gurgen and Abu-Mrvan yielded and withdrew. However, soon a new conflict broke out between Sargis-Ashot and Gurgen. To prevent further confrontation, Gagik Abu-Mrvan reconciled them. Shortly afterward, Gurgen, the prince of Andzevatsik, died.

Same time later, Gagik Abu-Mrvan summoned the three princely brothers—Sargis-Ashot, Gagik, and Gurgen—to his residence and imprisoned each of them in a separate fortress: Sargis-Ashot in the fortress of Nkan, Gagik in Sevan, and Gurgen in the fortress of Kotor. Later, Shapuh, the brother of Smbat, managed to free the middle brother Gagik from imprisonment. Gagik Abu-Mrvan took control of the entire territory of Vaspurakan. However, several princes of Vaspurakan, as a sign of protest against his rule, abandoned their provinces and moved to the city of Amid.

The governor of the city of Amid was the Arab ruler Ahmad, who had invaded Armenia and captured Taron, one of the most important provinces that had previously been under the authority of the Bagratuni dynasty. Smbat demanded that he withdraw from Taron, but the Arab emir refused to comply. Smbat assembled a powerful army and marched against him. According to Catholicos Hovhannes, the Armenian army numbered 60,000 soldiers, while Thomas Artsruni estimated it at 100,000. Smbat’s army was guided along a route suggested by his maternal cousin Gagik Abu-Mrvan. However, Abu-Mrvan betrayed his king and deliberately led the Armenian forces through a difficult and exhausting path, causing the troops to become severely weakened. The Armenian army eventually gathered near the village of Tukh, where the Arabs attacked the exhausted Armenian forces.

At the beginning of the battle, the Armenians managed to achieve some successes. However, the traitorous Gagik Abu-Mrvan, encouraged by the fact that his betrayal had not yet been discovered, committed another act of treachery. He spread panic among the Armenian ranks, causing heavy losses and forcing the Armenian army to retreat. According to Thomas Artsruni, the number of Armenian casualties reached approximately 5,000.

When the traitor Gagik returned to Vaspurakan, the middle brother Gagik, who had been freed from imprisonment at the request of the king’s brother Shapuh, organized a conspiracy against Gagik Abu-Mrvan. As a result, the traitor was killed. The three brothers were released from captivity, and the former status of the Kingdom of Vaspurakan was restored.

=== The Struggle Against Afshin ===
After the chaotic events in Vaspurakan, the Armenian noble (nakharar) system became fragmented, and it was impossible to maintain a powerful state with a divided aristocratic structure. King Smbat clearly understood this problem and began taking steps to restore order within the noble system. He sent his brother David to Vaspurakan to negotiate with Sargis-Ashot and persuade him not to join the side of Armenia’s enemies.

Sargis-Ashot had also received a similar offer from Afshin, who promised him prestigious titles and great honors. However, Sargis-Ashot chose to support Smbat instead. Afshin had long studied Smbat’s military strategies and understood that, during wars, the Armenian king would attempt to secure mountainous and difficult-to-access positions. Therefore, Afshin began his campaign through Aghvank and advanced toward Tbilisi. His goal was to deprive Smbat of important mountainous strongholds such as Gugark and Tayk. Afshin captured Tbilisi, then moved through Javakhk and into Vanand. Since Smbat’s army was not prepared for battle, he abandoned Dvin and withdrew to Tayk. Learning that the queen and several prominent noblewomen, along with the royal treasury, were located in the fortress of Kars, Afshin immediately besieged and captured the fortress. The Armenian queen and several noblewomen were taken captive. The state treasury was also looted, after which Afshin went to Dvin to spend the winter there.

Negotiations began between Smbat and Afshin, during which Afshin presented harsh demands. He wanted to take Ashot, Smbat’s eldest son and future heir to the throne, as a hostage. Smbat had no other choice and agreed to this condition. As a result of the negotiations, a peace agreement was concluded. After spending the winter, Afshin released the Armenian queen but kept Smbat’s daughter-in-law in captivity and returned to Atropatene.

In order to restore his previous position, Smbat granted a crown to his relative Adarnase Bagratuni and made him the King of Iberia (Georgia). This action should be viewed from several perspectives: Smbat I aimed to strengthen the position of the Bagratuni dynasty in Iberia and gain a reliable ally. He could no longer control the situation in Armenia solely through his own forces and was forced to rely on neighboring princes. Smbat also sought to demonstrate that the Bagratid Kingdom functioned not only through military power but also through dynastic ties and diplomacy. Through this action, he intended to use Iberia in the interests of the Armenian kingdom. This decision provoked jealousy among Adarnase’s opponents, who complained to Afshin. Afshin needed a new pretext for another campaign. He declared that only the Caliph had the authority to grant a crown and once again began marching toward Armenia through the traditional route of Aghvank. This time as well, Smbat avoided direct confrontation and withdrew to Tayk with a small detachment. Afshin reached Dvin without bloodshed, appointed his son Devdad and his eunuch as administrators of Armenia, and then returned to Atropatene. After settling his conflict with Smbat, Afshin decided to take revenge on the princes of Vaspurakan for joining Smbat’s side. Sargis-Ashot, after negotiating with his brothers, decided to visit Afshin and establish peace. Afshin demanded that Gagik remain with him as a hostage, and after five months he was replaced by Gurgen. However, Gurgen could not endure life in Afshin’s court and escaped, returning to his brothers. Because of this, Afshin invaded Vaspurakan and appointed two other governors there. Among those fighting on Afshin’s side was also Hasan, who caused great difficulties for the Kingdom of Vaspurakan.

Smbat returned from Tayk and went to the fortress of Ani, where he met the eunuch whom Afshin had left behind and established friendly relations with him. As a result of this friendship, Smbat was able to secure the release of his crown prince son, Ashot, as well as his daughter-in-law. Upon learning about this alliance, Afshin launched another campaign against Armenia. However, an epidemic (probably cholera) broke out among his army, causing the deaths of a large number of soldiers, including Afshin himself and the two governors of Vaspurakan. After Afshin’s death, Smbat was able to quickly restore Armenia’s independence and recover its former strength.

=== Internal Life of the Country ===
After the death of Afshin, a period of relative peace was established in Armenia, which Smbat used to restore the country’s strength and rebuild its power. During this time, Sargis-Ashot reconciled his relations with Smbat. The major internal conflicts within Vaspurakan came to an end; however, one figure continued to disrupt the peaceful life of the state—Hasan.

On one occasion, when Sargis-Ashot had stopped at a village house, Hasan surrounded the building with his men and attempted to climb onto the roof. However, the roof collapsed, causing Hasan to fall. Sargis-Ashot immediately captured him and demanded the return of the fortress of Sevan. Hasan’s mother and brother opposed this demand and appealed to Smbat to resolve the dispute. As a mediator, Smbat sent Catholicos Hovhannes, who arranged an agreement: the fortress would be handed over to Sargis-Ashot, and Hasan would be released unharmed. The agreement was carried out, but Sargis-Ashot broke his promise, blinded Hasan, and only then released him. Sargis-Ashot’s brother, Gagik, strongly condemned him for this act. According to Tovma Artsruni, after losing his sight, Hasan became a devout man and eventually even entered the clergy.

Despite the oath-breaking committed by Sargis-Ashot, his relationship with Smbat did not deteriorate; on the contrary, it became stronger. When the Kaysik tribe of the Apahunik district refused to recognize Smbat’s authority, the Armenian king assembled an army and launched a campaign against them. According to Tovma Artsruni, Smbat was defeated and began to retreat. However, Sargis-Ashot, with his own forces, achieved victory over the rebels and forced them to submit to Smbat’s authority. As a sign of gratitude for Sargis-Ashot’s support, Smbat granted him the city of Nakhichevan. However, by rewarding him in this manner, Smbat violated the hereditary rights of the Siuni princes.

The Siuni prince Smbat rebelled because of this decision and declared that he would no longer pay tribute to King Smbat and would instead direct his taxes to the emir of Atropatene. In response, King Smbat gathered an army of 25,000 soldiers and marched to the Sharur plain, while the rebellious Siuni prince prepared to confront him with a force of 10,000 soldiers. King Smbat also called upon Sargis-Ashot for assistance, and he willingly agreed to support the king. He also sent a letter to the rebellious Siuni prince Smbat, explaining the difficulties of defeating the Armenian king. The Siuni prince accepted this argument, collected the tribute owed to King Smbat, and went to meet him. A peace agreement was reached; however, this success was overshadowed by the death of Sargis-Ashot, who, after suffering for 40 days, died in 904 in Nakhichevan.

Following these events, a peaceful period began in the history of the Bagratid Kingdom. Despite the previous turbulent events, Armenia managed to develop both its cultural and economic potential, and the internal conflicts did not lead to widespread poverty in the country. One of the traveler-geographers, Ibn Hawqal, described Armenia as a land where abundance and low prices prevailed.

=== The Struggle Against Yusuf ===
After the death of Muhammad Ibn Abi'l-Saj Afshin, in 901, Yusuf became the ruler of the semi-independent provincial region of Atropatene. He removed Afshin’s heir, Devdad, and took possession of his brother’s throne. At that time, Smbat had requested the Arab Caliph to separate Armenia from Atropatene and make it directly tributary to Baghdad. The Caliph willingly accepted Smbat’s request, which greatly angered Yusuf. Yusuf appealed to the Caliph, asking him to restore the previous arrangement, but his request was rejected. However, Yusuf proved to be even more harsh and demanding than his brother Afshin.

Realizing that he would not be able to resolve the issue with Smbat through negotiations, Yusuf turned to military force. He chose the same route that his brother had previously used for his campaigns: an invasion from the northern side through Paytakaran and Aghvank toward Shirak. Smbat strengthened the mountain passes of Ashotsk and Tashir in order to prevent the Arabs from entering Shirak. However, Yusuf chose a completely unexpected route and managed to easily penetrate into the heart of the Bagratid Kingdom—Shirak. Without engaging in major military operations, Emir Yusuf advanced toward Dvin and captured the city. He believed that by seizing the center of the country, he would be able to impose his demands on Armenia. Smbat established his base of resistance in the fortifications of Mount Aragats, while Yusuf immediately began negotiations with him through a wealthy Syrian intermediary. Yusuf’s attitude toward the Armenian king was relatively moderate because he was planning to rebel against the Caliphate and did not want to have a powerful hostile state like Armenia behind him. He demanded only that the Armenians resume paying tribute to Atropatene and that Smbat receive his crown from Atropatene, meaning that he would become politically dependent on Yusuf. The amount of tribute to be paid would be determined by Smbat himself. After spending the winter and exchanging valuable gifts, Yusuf returned to Atropatene.

The peace agreement that had been concluded was intended to be long-lasting, as Atropatene did not yet have immediate plans regarding Armenia. However, under favorable circumstances, it still intended to completely subjugate Smbat. At that time, one of Georgia’s distant provinces, Mingrelia (the land of the Egers), rebelled. Smbat gathered an army and launched a campaign against them. He also called for assistance from his friend and ally, the Georgian king Adarnase Bagratuni, who was the father-in-law of the king of the Egers, Constantine, but had a serious conflict with his son-in-law. The Armenian-Georgian forces achieved victory, and Smbat ordered Adarnase to conduct negotiations with Constantine. However, Adarnase used this opportunity to take revenge and arrested Constantine, sending him to Armenia, where he was placed in the fortress of Ani. Seeing the possibility that the Egers might rebel again, King Smbat released Constantine and sent him back to his homeland with royal honors. This action had a very positive outcome, as Constantine remained grateful to Smbat for his honorable gesture.

However, Constantine’s action also had negative consequences. The Georgian king Adarnase Bagratuni became hostile toward Smbat, because Smbat had released Constantine without consulting him. At this time, Yusuf began his rebellion against the Caliphate. The Caliph decided to rely on his military forces and appealed to the neighboring states of Atropatene, requesting military assistance to force Yusuf into submission. According to Catholicos Hovhannes, a “secretary” was sent to Armenia with a proposal: Armenia would be exempt from paying taxes for one year in exchange for providing military support against Yusuf. Smbat could not sever his relations with the Caliphate; therefore, he sent a force of 1,000 soldiers toward Vaspurakan, which later assisted the Caliph in subduing Yusuf. After some time, Yusuf asked the Caliph for forgiveness, and the Caliph pardoned his rebellion and allowed him to remain as the ruler of Atropatene.

Armenia’s assistance to the Caliph created hostility toward Smbat in Yusuf’s eyes. At that time, Caliph al-Muktafi, against whom Yusuf had rebelled, died, and a weaker caliph came to power. This gave Yusuf greater freedom and determination to act. After ending his rebellion and restoring his authority over Atropatene, Yusuf demanded that Armenia pay him tribute. The Caliphate made the same demand as well. In order to satisfy both sides, Smbat doubled the taxes collected from the population, which caused growing dissatisfaction toward him among the people. Discontent arose not only among ordinary people but also among the nakharars (Armenian nobles), because the entire burden of tax collection fell heavily upon them.

The dissatisfaction grew to such an extent that a conspiracy was organized with the aim of assassinating Smbat. The organizers of the plot were Adarnase Bagratuni, who had not forgotten Smbat’s actions regarding Constantine, and Hasan, a royal official who enjoyed Smbat’s complete trust. After Smbat’s death, the Armenian throne was intended to pass to Adarnase. However, the conspiracy was discovered, and Smbat immediately returned to Yerazgavors and arrested all the conspirators. Meanwhile, Adarnase and Hasan looted Ani and fled to Tayk, where they fortified themselves in its natural strongholds. The news of the conspiracy spread throughout the entire country, and the people rose up to defend their king. When the Armenian army reached Iberia (Georgia), the soldiers wanted to massacre the local population, but Smbat declared that revenge should be taken against the guilty, not against innocent people. Adarnase admitted his guilt and asked Smbat for forgiveness. The Armenian king once again demonstrated his high moral principles: he forgave his former ally, but punished the Armenian traitors by blinding them. He then sent some of them to King Leo VI of Byzantium, while others were sent to King Constantine of the Egers. Through this action, Smbat attempted to eradicate treachery among the Armenians; however, its roots proved to be much deeper.

=== Establishment of the Kingdom of Vaspurakan ===
After the death of Sargis-Ashot in 904, the rule of Vaspurakan passed to his middle brother, Gagik. He was 25 years old when he assumed the administration of his province, but he had already distinguished himself many times through his outstanding military and diplomatic abilities. The two brothers, Gagik and Gurgen, divided Vaspurakan between themselves. The younger brother, Gurgen, received southeastern Vaspurakan, while Gagik received the northwestern part of the region. At that time, Vaspurakan was engaged in several small-scale conflicts, which brought them successful results. However, these smaller tribes united in the district of Zarevand (Salmast) and prepared to launch an invasion against Vaspurakan.

Understanding that it would be difficult to resist these forces militarily, Gagik immediately began negotiations with the leaders of these tribes. By accepting their demands, he concluded a peace agreement with them. Gagik began focusing on the internal problems of his state. He attempted to eliminate disorder and, for this reason, suppressed several princes who pursued separatist policies. One of these minor conflicts played a particularly important role in the history of Vaspurakan. Gagik organized a campaign against the fortress of Amjuk. According to Tovma Artsruni, Gagik “stole” the fortress. This suggests that, in order to capture this seemingly impregnable stronghold, Gagik used certain strategies or deceptions and managed to seize it quickly without relying on a large military force. The fortress belonged to the Arab Utmanik tribe.

Although Thomas Artsruni attempts in his work to show that relations between Vaspurakan and Atropatene deteriorated after the capture of Amjuk, it is clear that relations between the two remained at a relatively high level even afterward. For this reason, Smbat tried in every possible way to influence Gagik and prevent him from carrying out such actions, but his efforts were unsuccessful. In order to discipline Vaspurakan, Smbat supported the rights of the Utmanik tribe and recaptured the fortress of Amjuk. According to Tovma Artsruni, after capturing the fortress, Smbat later sold it back to Gagik; however, the meaning and purpose of this action remain unclear.

The massacre of the Arab population of Amjuk Fortress provoked a desire for revenge among the Muslims. They gathered again in the district of Salmast with the intention of waging a religious war against Gagik. When the Muslim forces invaded the Mardastan district of Vaspurakan, they were confronted by the brave Thaddeus of Aké (Tadeos Akeatsi), who defeated and drove them back.

Realizing that they could not overcome the state ruled by Gagik, the invaders withdrew. Soon, a territorial dispute arose between the Artsruni and Siuni dynasties. The subject of the dispute was the city of Nakhichevan, which had previously been returned to Smbat Siuni, while Gagik Artsruni wanted to regain control of it. Smbat responded that Nakhchavan had been granted to the Siunis with his approval and by an official royal charter. This disagreement became the cause of a large-scale internal war among the Armenians.

Gagik turned to Yusuf, who sent him a crown in 908 and recognized him as the “King of All Armenians.” Both Gagik and Smbat understood the true purpose behind Yusuf’s actions: he sought to create division among the Armenian princes. However, Gagik could not reunify all of Armenia under his rule because the Bagratid Kingdom still existed, and destroying it would have required enormous military resources. By placing his personal political interests and the independence of Vaspurakan above the unity of Armenia, Gagik’s actions objectively contributed to the weakening of Bagratid authority. Nevertheless, the political situation of the early 10th century must also be taken into account: competition between noble houses and interference by external powers forced Armenian princes to make decisions that were not always straightforward. Therefore, Yusuf and Gagik joined their forces and began their struggle against Smbat.

Understanding that an alliance between Vaspurakan and Atropatene could become disastrous for Armenia, Smbat sent a delegation with rich gifts to Yusuf ibn Abi'l-Saj, led by Catholicos Hovhannes Draskhanakerttsi. The Catholicos asked Yusuf to abandon his decision to invade Armenia, but Yusuf remained determined. He arrested Catholicos Hovhannes, thereby giving his answer to Smbat. In order to help Yusuf quickly prepare for his campaign, Gagik sent his brother Gurgen, who held the title of marzpan, to Yusuf. Gagik himself later went to meet Yusuf personally. Catholicos Hovhannes believed that Gagik would intervene for his release, since Gagik was also a Christian; however, this did not happen.

In 909, Yusuf gathered a large army and launched a campaign against Armenia. At the Armenian border, he was joined by Gagik Artsruni, his brother Gurgen, and other princes of Vaspurakan along with their forces. Instead of taking his usual route toward Dvin, Yusuf moved northward and entered Syunik, because Gagik was involved in territorial disputes with the region. Smbat was unable to achieve victory in this mountainous warfare, and eventually the entire Siuni dynasty was forced to flee, with each member escaping to different parts of the country.

Yusuf then moved toward Dvin, taking Catholicos Hovhannes Draskhanakerttsi with him. Among the princes of Syunik, Grigor Supan hoped that if he surrendered to Yusuf, his family would be spared, and therefore he resorted to this desperate measure. Yusuf correctly assessed the situation and received the prince favorably. The example of Grigor Supan proved influential, and several other Siuni princes went to Yusuf and surrendered.

The unity among the Armenian princes collapsed. At that point, Yusuf announced that he would leave Armenia if Smbat sent him one year’s tribute. Trusting Yusuf’s promise, Smbat sent him 60,000 gold coins. After receiving the gold, Yusuf left Dvin and began a campaign against Smbat. Smbat managed to escape and reached the village of Odzun, from where he continued to Tayk and fortified himself there. However, Yusuf continued pursuing him. Historians compared these pursuits to a hunt, but Yusuf’s “hunt” was unsuccessful, as he managed only to capture Tbilisi, and because of the approaching winter, he was forced to return to Dvin. After Yusuf’s return, Smbat also returned to Yerazgavors, where he learned that his nephew Ashot, the son of his brother Shapuh and the commander-in-chief (Sparapet), had also gone to Yusuf and surrendered. This was a severe blow to Smbat. According to various interpretations, it was because of Ashot Sparapet’s surrender that Yusuf released Catholicos Hovhannes.

In the spring of 910, Yusuf formed an army from Armenian forces. However, this time he did not lead it personally; instead, he entrusted command to Gagik, Gurgen, and other Artsruni princes. His goal was to provoke a civil war among the Armenians. Smbat gathered his remaining forces and formed an army, placing its command in the hands of his two sons, Ashot and Mushegh. The Armenian king ordered them to conduct only defensive warfare. However, during the battle at Dzknavachar, the two young princes launched an offensive attack and even caused panic among the Persian forces. Hope arose that the Armenians would achieve victory, but treachery occurred on the wing of the army commanded by Ashot. The troops of the Sevordi, a group of Utian origin, betrayed the Armenian forces, causing Ashot to retreat.

After the defeat at Dzknavachar, widespread looting began throughout Armenia. The princes who had surrendered or had been captured during the battles were executed. Among those killed were Grigor Supan Siuni, the royal son Mushegh, and Smbat, the son of the king’s brother Sahak. At this point, Gagik and Gurgen realized the mistake they had made. They understood that their own lives were also in danger and that they were under Yusuf’s control. Therefore, they became more submissive and obedient, faithfully serving Yusuf and carrying out his orders. Smbat sent a delegation to Baghdad, requesting that the Caliph take measures to restrain Yusuf. However, the Caliphate was occupied with a major rebellion that had broken out in Egypt. Smbat also appealed to the Byzantine emperor Leo VI the Wise, who promised to help him. Unfortunately, Leo VI died in the same year, and his successor was indifferent and did not intervene in Armenian affairs. Realizing that he had to resist with his limited forces, Smbat left Yeraskhadzor. Yusuf then besieged the fortress of Vagharshakert (modern-day Alashkert), which blocked the western entrance to the district of Yeraskhadzor. A great massacre took place among the Armenians. It was likely influenced by witnessing these events that Gagik realized the magnitude of his mistake and decided to reconcile with his uncle, Smbat, and reunite with him. Smbat forgave him and agreed to join forces, but it was already too late.

Yusuf increased his pressure, and Smbat retreated to the impregnable Kapuyt Fortress. For about one year, Smbat resisted the siege. However, negotiations eventually began, during which Yusuf promised not to harm Smbat if he surrendered. Smbat surrendered, while Gagik managed to escape from the army and withdrew to the fortresses of Korduk. When Yusuf learned of these events, he directed all his anger toward Smbat. He took the Armenian king in chains to Dvin and subjected him to inhumane torture. Smbat was brought before the fortress of Ernjak, hoping that the defenders would see their king’s suffering, feel pity, and surrender. However, this did not happen. Finally, in 914, Yusuf grew tired of torturing Smbat and ordered his execution. Smbat was beheaded, and his body was taken to Dvin, where it was crucified and displayed on the city walls.

=== The Return of Nakhchavan to the Siunis ===
The Artsrunis sought to incorporate the province of Mokk into Vaspurakan as well. At this time, Gurgen, the ruler of Andzevatsik, was fighting against Mushegh, the prince of Mokk. Gurgen defeated and killed Mushegh in battle, but Mokk itself remained independent. Meanwhile, Taron, Sasun, and Aghdznik were conquered by the Mesopotamian emir Ahmad al-Shaybani, who also carried out attacks against Vaspurakan. He arrested the emir of Arzn, Aplmakhr, who was related by marriage to the Artsruni family and had converted to Christianity. In 896, the emir of Atropatene, Afshin, allied with Smbat I, launched a campaign against Vaspurakan with the intention of taking revenge against Ashot Artsruni. Afshin carried out raids throughout Vaspurakan, seized Van, and forced the Artsruni brothers to settle near the approaches of the fortresses of Jdmar and Sring. The territories that had been conquered from Persian Armenia (Parskahayk) were separated from Vaspurakan.

The issue of the city of Nakhchavan and its surrounding district was of great importance in the history of Vaspurakan. This ancient Armenian city naturally became part of the Bagratid Kingdom during the establishment of Bagratuni rule. Nakhichevan was a strategically important center that strengthened Vaspurakan’s political connections with Ayrarat and Syunik. Based on historical experience, the Bagratid kings understood that Nakhichevan could serve as a base for Atropatene against Armenia. At a suitable moment, the emir of Atropatene could use the route Nakhichevan–Goghtn–Dvin to divide Armenian forces. However, if the city belonged to Vaspurakan, the rulers of Atropatene would first have to confront the Artsrunis when attempting aggression against Armenia. In 902, King Smbat I granted Nakhchavan to his maternal cousin Ashot Artsruni, the senior ruler of Vaspurakan, as a reward for his assistance in the victory over the Kaysik tribe near Manazkert. Although the city was still mentioned as part of Vaspurakan in the Ashkharhatsuyts, in the early 8th century, when the power of Armenian noble families, including the Artsrunis, was destroyed by the Arabs, the city was taken from the weakened Artsrunis and placed under the authority of an Arab emir. Since Nakhichevan was granted to Ashot Artsruni in 902 as a reward for his service, it was considered a conditional possession rather than hereditary and inalienable property (although Tovma Artsruni tended to view it as hereditary). Therefore, after Ashot’s death in 904, the Armenian king took Nakhichevan away from Vaspurakan and later placed it under the authority of the Siuni rulers. This is supported by the fact that after Ashot Artsruni’s death in 904, when his brothers Gagik and Gurgen divided Vaspurakan between themselves, Nakhichevan was not included in the possessions of either brother. However, the economic importance of Nakhichevan was even greater for Syunik, where urban centers were relatively few. The city was most likely granted by the Armenian king to Syunik in 908, when it became clearly evident to Smbat I that Yusuf and Gagik Artsruni had formed an alliance.

== Death ==
Yusuf's army ravaged the rest of Armenia as it advanced toward Berd Kapoyt (Blue Fortress), where Smbat had taken refuge, and besieged it for some time. Smbat finally decided to surrender himself to Yusuf in 914 in hopes of ending the Arab onslaught; Yusuf, however, showed no compassion toward his prisoner as he brought him to Yernjak, tortured the Armenian king to death, beheaded him, and put the headless body on display on a cross in Dvin. Smbat's contemporary, Hovhannes Draskhanakerttsi, writes that the ground where the crucifix was raised became a site for pilgrimage for both Christians and non-Christians. Information provided by later Armenian authors suggested that Smbat's body was taken down and brought to the monastery at Artsvanist.

== Family ==
Ashot the Great; Prince of Princes, sparapet (855–885) king of Armenia (885–890)	Katranide I Queen of Armenia (885–890)
Smbat king of Armenia (890–914)	Sahak	David (†902)	Shapuh sparapet (†912)
Sofya	Grigor-Derenik prince of Vaspurakan (857–887)	daughter	Vahan Artsruni	Mariam (†914)	Vasak Syuni prince of Syunik (855–859)
Ashot prince of Vaspurakan (898–904)	Gagik prince and king of Vaspurakan (904–908) / (908–943)	Gurgen prince of Parskahayk (904–925)	Grigor prince of Syunik (855–859) (859–913)	Sahak	Vasak
Ashot the Iron king of Armenia (914–928)	Sahakanuysh Sevada	Abas king of Armenia (928–953)	Gurgendukht Bagratuni	Seda	son	Ashot

== See also ==
• Abas Bagratuni

• Bagratid Armenia

• Ashot I

• Sajid Emirate

• Arab Caliphate

• Byzantine Empire

• Kingdom of Vaspurakan

• Ashot-Sargis Artsruni

• Gagik I Artsruni

• Gurgen II Artsruni

• Ashot II the Iron (Ashot II Yerkat)

== Sources ==
- Ռաֆիկ Մաթևոսեան։ Բագրատունեաց Հայաստանի պետական կառուցուածքն ու վարչական կարգը։ Հայաստանի Գիտութիւնների ակադեմիայի հրատարակչութիւն։ Երևան, 1990թ․։ 293 էջ։
- Ռաֆիկ Մաթևոսեան։ Բագրատունիներ․ Պատմա–տոհմաբանական հանրագիտարան։ Երևան, 1997թ․։
- Ռաֆիկ Մաթևոսեան։ Հայկական զինանշաններ․ Բագրատունիներ, Զաքարեաններ, Մամիկոնենաներ։ Երևան, 1994 թ․։
- Ռաֆիկ Մաթևոսեան։ Տաշիր–Ձորագետ։ (X դ. - XXI դ. սկիզբ)։ 1982 թ․։
- Ռաֆիկ Մաթևոսեան։ Gosudarstvennoe ustroĭstvo i administrativnyĭ stroĭ Բագրատիդսկոյ Արմենիի։ Երևան, 1991 թ․։ Ռուսերէն։
- Եղիազարյան Ա, Հայ Բագրատունիների տերությունը (885-908թթ.), Երևան, ԵՊՀ հրատ., 2011,
- Բալայան, Վահրամ (2011). Արցախի Պատմությունը Հնադարից Մինչև Մեր Օրերը. Երևան: Զանգակ. pp. 81–87. ISBN 978-99941-1-917-2.
- Leo (1967) [1946]. Հայոց Պատմություն։ Միջին դարեր [Armenian History: Middle Ages] (in Armenian). Vol. 2. Yerevan: "Armenia" publishing house.
- М. Нерсисян. (1985). "Противоборство центральных княжеств и нахарарств". История армянского народа (in Armenian). Ереван: Издательство Ереванского Университета. p. 528.
- Rapp, Stephen H. (2003). Studies In Medieval Georgian Historiography: Early Texts And Eurasian Contexts. Corpus Scriptorum Christianorum Orientalium. Vol. 601. Peeters Publishers. ISBN 90-429-1318-5.

Smbat I of Armenia Bagratid Kingdom of Armenia Born: 850 Died: 914
Preceded by Ashot I 885-890	Smbat I 890-914	Succeeded by Ashot II 914-928
