= Doghs =

Village in Armavir, Armenia

Doghs Դողս
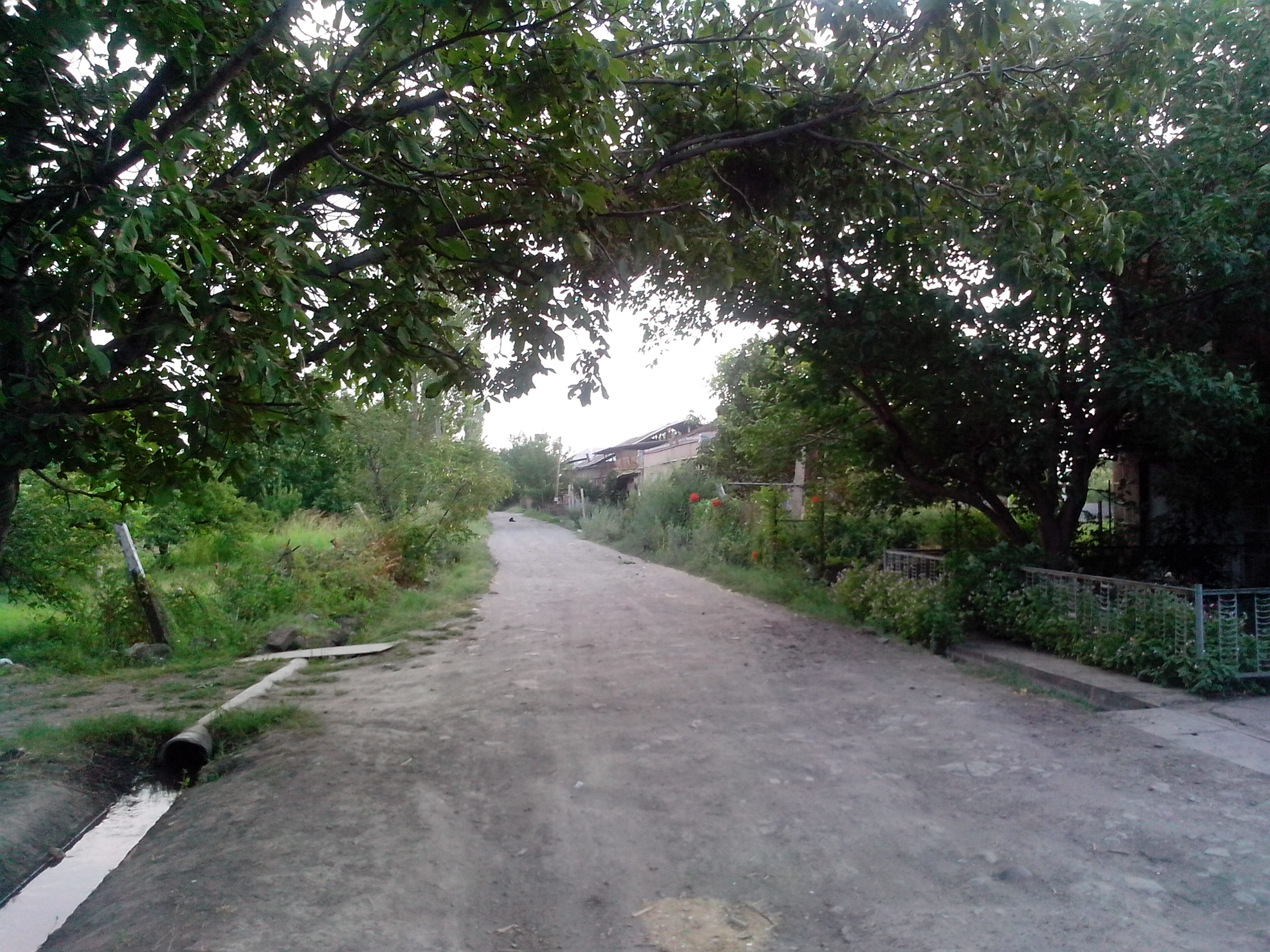
- Village streets at Doghs

- Location within Armenia
- Coordinates: 40°13′22″N 44°16′18″E
- Country: Armenia
- Marz (Province): Armavir

Area
  - Total: 3.82 km^{2} (1.47 sq mi)
- Elevation: 870 m (2,850 ft)

Population (2011)
  - Total: 1,339
  - Density: 351/km^{2} (908/sq mi)
- Time zone: UTC+4 ( )
  - Summer (DST): UTC+5 ( )

Doghs (Armenian: Դողս) is a village in the Armavir Province of Armenia. In 894, Smbat I defeated Emir Apshin of Atrapatakan in a battle at Doghs. The town's church, dedicated to Surb Stepanos (Saint Stephen), was built in the 19th century. There are also some 19th-century graves in the vicinity. The village has a school (247 students), first aid station, house of culture, and community center.

== Gallery ==
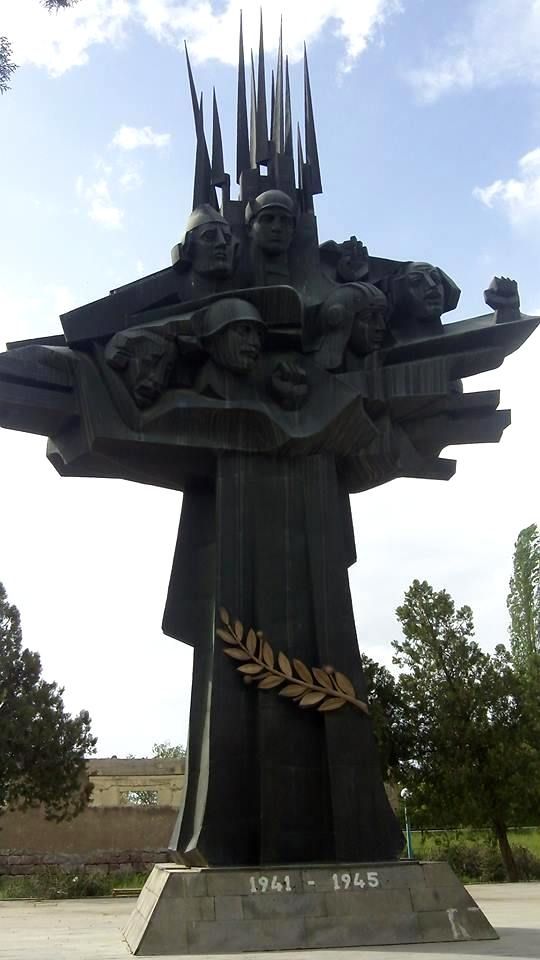
World War II monument

== See also ==
- Armavir Province
