= Muratsan =

Armenian writer (1854–1908)

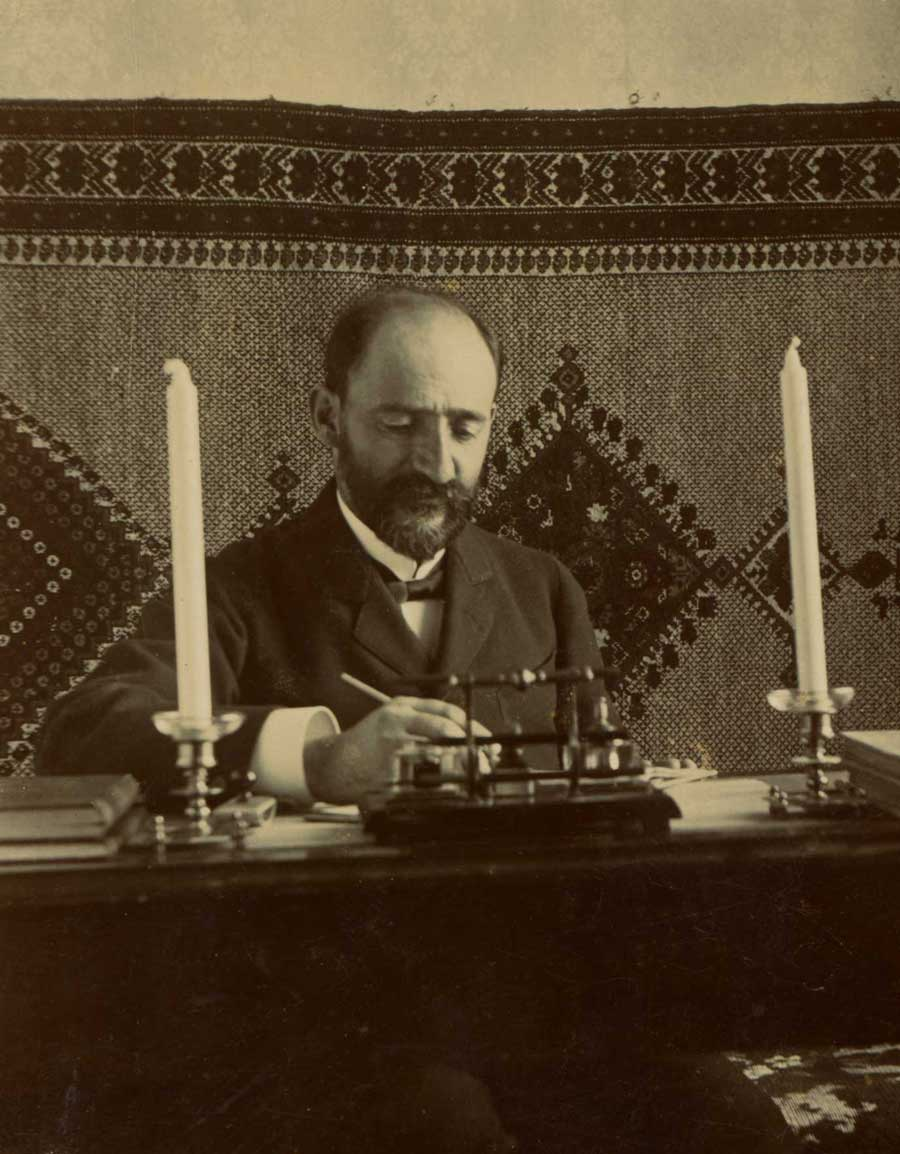
- Born: Grigor Ter-Hovhannisian; 1 December 1854; Shusha, Russian Empire
- Died: 12 September 1908 (aged 53); Tiflis, Russian Empire
- Occupations: Writer, teacher, accountant
- Writing career
- Genres: Historical fiction
- Literary movement: Romanticism

Grigor Ter-Hovhannisian (Armenian: Գրիգոր Տեր-Հովհաննիսյան; 1 December 1854 – 12 September 1908), better known as Muratsan (Armenian: Մուրացան), was a prolific Armenian writer, known best for writing Gevorg Marzpetuni (1896), a historical novel set during the time of King Ashot II in Armenia in the tenth century.

== Biography ==
Grigor Ter-Hovhannisian, better known by the pen name Muratsan, was born in the city of Shusha in the region of Karabakh on 1 December 1854 (Old Style). His father was a craftsman. He first attended local private schools. His father died when he was twelve years old, leaving his family in a difficult financial situation. His mother was forced to move him to a cheaper school. A year later, he enrolled as a tuition-free student in the Shusha parish secondary school, from which he graduated in June 1873. He excelled at school and spent most of his free time reading. It was at the parish school that his love for Armenian history and the old Armenian historians was nurtured. He learned excellent Classical Armenian, as well as some Russian and French, at the parish school. He spent a year after graduating furthering his knowledge of French.

In 1875–76 Muratsan taught Armenian language and history at a school in Shusha. In 1877 he traveled around Karabakh, visiting and studying many historical sites. Upon his return to Shushi, he wrote a brief history of the noble Hasan-Jalalyan family. In 1878 he moved to Tiflis (modern-day Tbilisi, Georgia), where he worked as an accountant and remained for the rest of his life. He first received recognition for his historical drama Ruzan kam Hayrenaser oriord (Ruzan, or the patriotic maiden), written in 1881 and performed at a Tiflis theater in 1882 (the play was first published in 1900). His historical novel Gevorg Marzpetuni is regarded as his greatest work. The novel is set in tenth-century Armenia, during the reign of Ashot II. The novel's titular protagonist is a patriotic military leader who places national interests above his personal desires. In addition to Gevorg Marzpetuni, he wrote many short stories and novels, including The Apostle (1902). An intensely nationalistic writer, Muratsan was one of the last Armenian representatives of Romanticism and kept to this style even as it was supplanted by other trends. He stood out as one of the few notable authors of his time that maintained strictly conservative views and rejected the progressive and reformist ideas that were becoming popular among Armenian intellectuals in the late nineteenth century.

A hospital, a street, and a school in Yerevan, Armenia, are named after him.

== Ruzan ==
Ruzan is a historical drama which takes place in the thirteenth century during the Mongol-Tatar invasions. Ruzan was the daughter of prince Hasan-Jalal Dawla. Faced with the choice of conversion or death, she refuses to betray her countrymen and her religion and as a consequence is executed.
