= Gevorg Marzpetuni (novel) =

1896 novel by Muratsan

- Author: Muratsan
- Language: Armenian
- Genre: Historical novel
- Publisher: Ardzagank magazine, Tiflis
- Publication date: 1896
- Publication place: Armenia

Gevorg Marzpetuni (Armenian: Գևորգ Մարզպետունի) is a historical novel by the Armenian writer Muratsan (Grigor Ter-Hovhannisyan). It is considered to be one of the most notable pieces of Armenian literature. The novel was written and appeared in serialized form in 1896 in the Tiflis-based Armenian journal Ardzagank. It was published as a book in 1912.

The novel illustrates Armenia's history in the 10th century and includes references to a number of real people and events, including King Ashot II Yerkat (Iron), Lord Gevorg Marzpetuni, the Armenian war against the Arab emirs, life in the countryside, and the plots and intrigues of the lords and ministers at the royal court. It is Muratsan's best known work; like his other writings, it is in Romantic style.
