= Verkhniy Aluchalu =

Abandoned village in Gegharkunik, Armenia

- Location within Armenia Location within Gegharkunik
- Coordinates: 40°06′17″N 45°32′07″E
- Country: Armenia
- Marz (Province): Gegharkunik
- Time zone: UTC+4 ( )
  - Summer (DST): UTC+5 ( )

Verkhniy Aluchalu is a town in the Gegharkunik Province of Armenia.
