= Ashot II of Armenia =

King of Armenia from 914 to 929

Ashot II The Iron Աշոտ Բ Երկաթ
- King of Armenia; Shahanshah
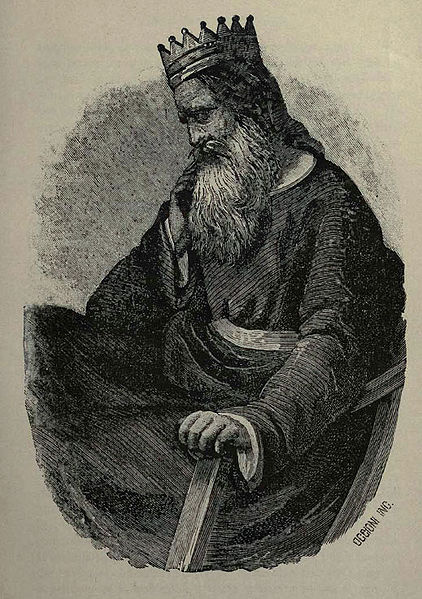
- Imaginary illustration of Ashot the Iron from the book Illustrated Armenia and Armenians (1898)

King of Armenia
- Reign: 914–929
- Predecessor: Smbat I
- Successor: Abas I
- Died: 929
- Spouse: Unnamed daughter of Sahak Sevada
- Dynasty: Bagratuni
- Father: Smbat I
- Religion: Armenian Apostolic

Ashot II the Iron (Armenian: Աշոտ Բ; died 929) was king of Bagratid Armenia from 914 to 929. He was the son and successor of King Smbat I. His reign was filled with rebellions by vassals and pretenders to the throne, as well as foreign invasions, which Ashot fought off successfully, for which he is remembered by the epithet Yerkat’ (Երկաթ), or the Iron.

== Reign ==
Ashot II succeeded his father Smbat I upon the latter's death in 914. Smbat had fought off an invasion launched by the Emir of Atropatene, Yusuf Ibn Abi'l-Saj, but when Smbat surrendered he was tortured and beheaded by Yusuf in Yernjak. Having taken control of the central lands of Armenia, Yusuf installed Ashot II's first cousin, also named Ashot, in Dvin as the "anti-king" of Bagratid Armenia. Harried by Yusuf's forces, Ashot II visited Constantinople to receive aid from Empress Zoe Karbonopsina. Ashot II was well received, and a Byzantine force was assembled to assist Armenia in defeating the Arabs. The force accompanying Ashot II, led by the Domestic of the Schools Leo Phokas the Elder, moved out the next year and marched along the Upper Euphrates, entering Taron with scant opposition from the Arabs.

Ashot the pretender and Yusuf's armies were unable to stop the Byzantine advance, which stopped short of capturing Dvin due to the onset of winter. Nevertheless, the force had returned Ashot II to a powerful position in Armenia and managed to inflict heavy casualties against the Arabs. This still left the anti-king Ashot in control of Dvin, and civil war raged on from 918 to 920, when the pretender finally conceded defeat. Numerous other rebellions in Armenia also took place, but Ashot II was able to defeat each one of them. In 919, Yusuf instigated a failed rebellion against the Caliph and was replaced by a far more well-disposed Arab governor, Subuk. In 922, Ashot II was recognized as the ruler of Armenia by the Abbasid caliph in Baghdad and Subuk recognized him as shahanshah, or "king of kings".

The Byzantines were distressed with Ashot II's close relations with the Arabs and dispatched a new force under the Domestic of the Schools John Kourkouas to disrupt Ashot II's position as king and to support the rebels fighting him. In 922, Kourkouas reached Dvin in an unsuccessful attempt to capture a city that was defended by both the Arabs and Ashot II. In 923, the Caliph, facing troubles at home, released Yusuf, who traveled back to Armenia to unleash his fury against Ashot II. He began demanding tribute from the Armenian rulers but faced considerable resistance from Ashot II. Time and again, Ashot II was able to defeat and rout the Arab armies sent against him for several years. A second unsuccessful attempt by Kourkouas to take Dvin in 927/8 coincided with Ashot II's victory over an invading Muslim army near Lake Sevan and again north of Dvin. Byzantine emperor Romanos I Lekapenos soon turned his attention to the east to fight the Arabs in Syria, leaving Ashot II master of his domain at the end of his reign. Ashot II died in 929 without any sons or heirs and was succeeded by his brother Abas I.

== Family ==
Ashot II was married to an unnamed daughter of Prince Sahak Sevada, the powerful ruler of Gardman whom Ashot II had blinded after a failed revolt. His wife's name is sometimes given as Maria. The chronicles of Stepanos Asoghik makes no mention of any children.

== In modern-day Armenia ==
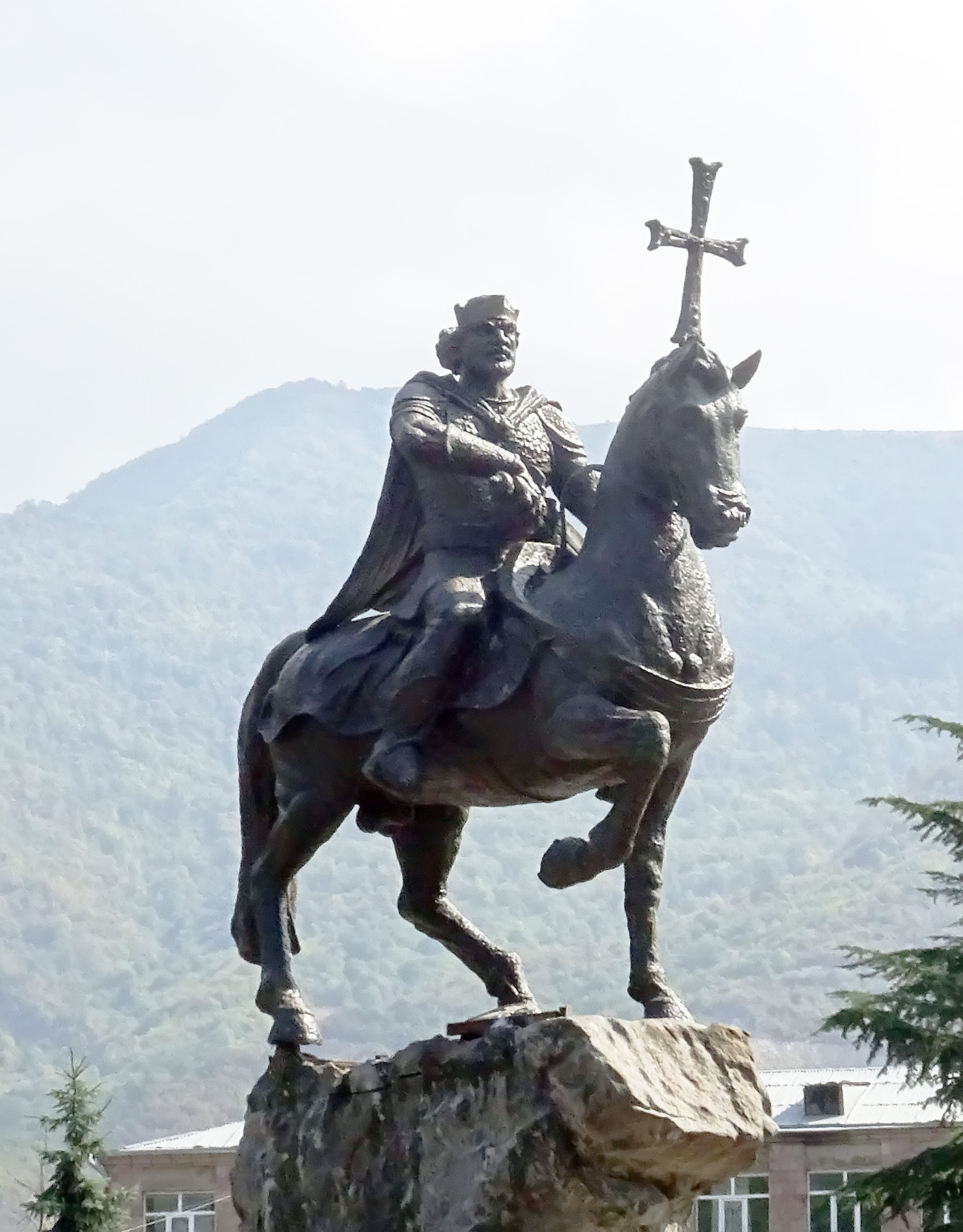
A statue of Ashot II in Ijevan

In 2012, on the occasion of the 20th anniversary of the Armed Forces of Armenia, the cross that Ashot II is said to have carried into battle with him was declared the "Guardian of the Armenian Army" by Catholicos Karekin II. During the Armenian Independence Day parade in 2016, honor guards posted the flag of King Ashot II the Iron before the parade proceedings.

== Popular culture ==
Ashot II features prominently as a character in Muratsan's nineteenth-century historical novel Gevorg Marzpetuni.

Preceded by Smbat I	King of Armenia; 914–928	Succeeded by Abas I
