= Adarnase =

Adarnase (Georgian: ადარნასე) is a Georgian masculine name derived from the Persian name Ādurnarsēh.

Adarnase may refer to:

- Adarnase of Hereti, Georgian king
- Adarnase I of Tao-Klarjeti, Georgian prince
- Adarnase I of Iberia, Georgian prince
- Adarnase II of Iberia, Georgian prince
- Adarnase II of Klarjeti, Georgian prince
- Adarnase II of Tao-Klarjeti, Georgian prince
- Adarnase III of Iberia, Georgian prince
- Adarnase III of Tao, Georgian prince
- Adarnase IV of Iberia, Georgian king
- Adarnase V of Tao, Georgian prince
- Prince Adarnase of Kartli, Georgian prince royal
- Adarnase of Abkhazia, Georgian king
