= Alinja =

- Municipality
- Location within Azerbaijan
- Coordinates: 39°10′16″N 45°41′46.7″E
- Country: Azerbaijan
- Autonomous republic: Nakhchivan
- District: Julfa

Population
  - Total: 634
- Time zone: UTC+4 (AZT)

Alinja (also rendered as "Alıncak"; Azerbaijani: Əlincə; Armenian: Երնջակ, romanized: Yernjak) is a village and municipality in the Julfa District of Nakhchivan, Azerbaijan.

== History ==
Alinja is mentioned in historical records for the first time in the seventh century atlas, the Ashkharhatsuyts, commonly attributed to Anania Shirakatsi, under its original Armenian name, Yernjak. It is described as the first district of the Kingdom of Armenia's province of Syunik'. The ruins of the medieval Yernjak (or Ernjak) fortress, which dates to the seventh century, are located on a crag overlooking Alinja village. This fortress once controlled and gave its name to, Yernjak province, which comprised the whole valley down to the Araks river. A separate Armenian tradition states that the province was named after Lady Yernjik, a member of the royal family of the Syunik' princes. An Azerbaijani tradition formulated much later, attributed the town's name to a tribe supposedly called the Azari.

The Armenian historian Stepanos Orbelian noted its formidable position, describing it as the "impossibly impenetrable Yernjak" (անհնարին ամուրն Երնջակ).

The province belonged to the Arshakuni kings of Armenia until their kingdom was dissolved in 428 A.D. The Armenian king Smbat I Bagratuni captured the canton and the fortress from the Arabs, who had taken them in 698. However, the emir of Āzarbāijān, Yusuf Ibn Abi'l-Saj, put the fortress under siege for a year and captured it, awarding it to the Muslim emir of Goght'n. The long and arduous struggle between King Smbat and emir Yusuf ended at Yernjak, where the latter put the former to death in 914. However, by the end of the tenth century Yernjak was back in the hands of the princes of Syunik'. After the dissolution of the Bagratuni Kingdom of Armenia in 1045, in the following centuries the region passed into the hands of external powers. It was taken by the Seljuks in the eleventh century, and by the Mongols in the thirteenth century. Yernjak was invested by the forces of Tamerlane but the fortress managed to withstand the siege for thirteen years until it was taken in 1401. Qara Iskander, the ruler of Kara Koyunlu was murdered in the castle in 1437 by his son Shah Kubad. The fortress was probably razed by the forces of Nadir Shah.

The mausoleum and shrine of the Hurufi Fazlallah are located on a hillside overlooking the village.

The district became part of the Russian Empire following the conclusion of the 1826-1828 Russo-Persian war. In 1921 it became a part of the Azerbaijan SSR.
