= Artsvanist =

Village in Gegharkunik, Armenia

Artsvanist Արծվանիստ
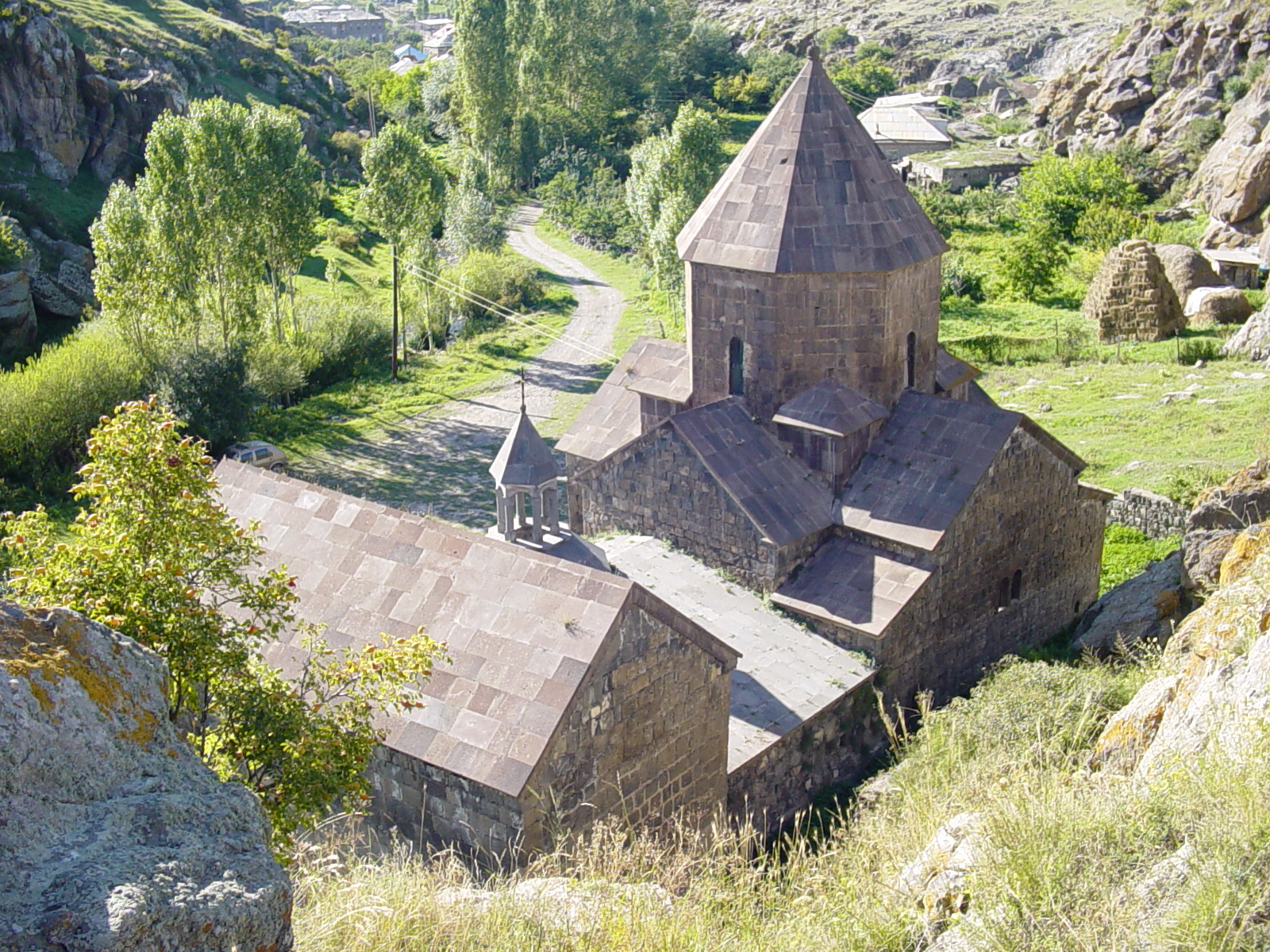
- Vanevan Monastery

- Location within Armenia Location within Gegharkunik
- Coordinates: 40°09′18″N 45°30′28″E
- Country: Armenia
- Province: Gegharkunik
- Municipality: Martuni
- Founded: 1829–1830
- Elevation: 1,941 m (6,368 ft)

Population (2011)
  - Total: 2,825
- Time zone: UTC+4 (AMT)
- Postal code: 1404

Artsvanist (Armenian: Արծվանիստ) is a village in the Martuni Municipality of the Gegharkunik Province of Armenia, located to the south of Lake Sevan. In the gorge south of the village is the important early 10th century monastery of Vanevan and a large but broken medieval khachkar monument nearby.

== Toponymy ==
The village was known as Nerkin Aluchalu and Alichali until 1968, rendered as Nizhniy Aluchalu in Russian.

== History ==
The village was founded in 1829-30 by migrants from Alashkert, in present-day Eastern Turkey.

== Gallery ==
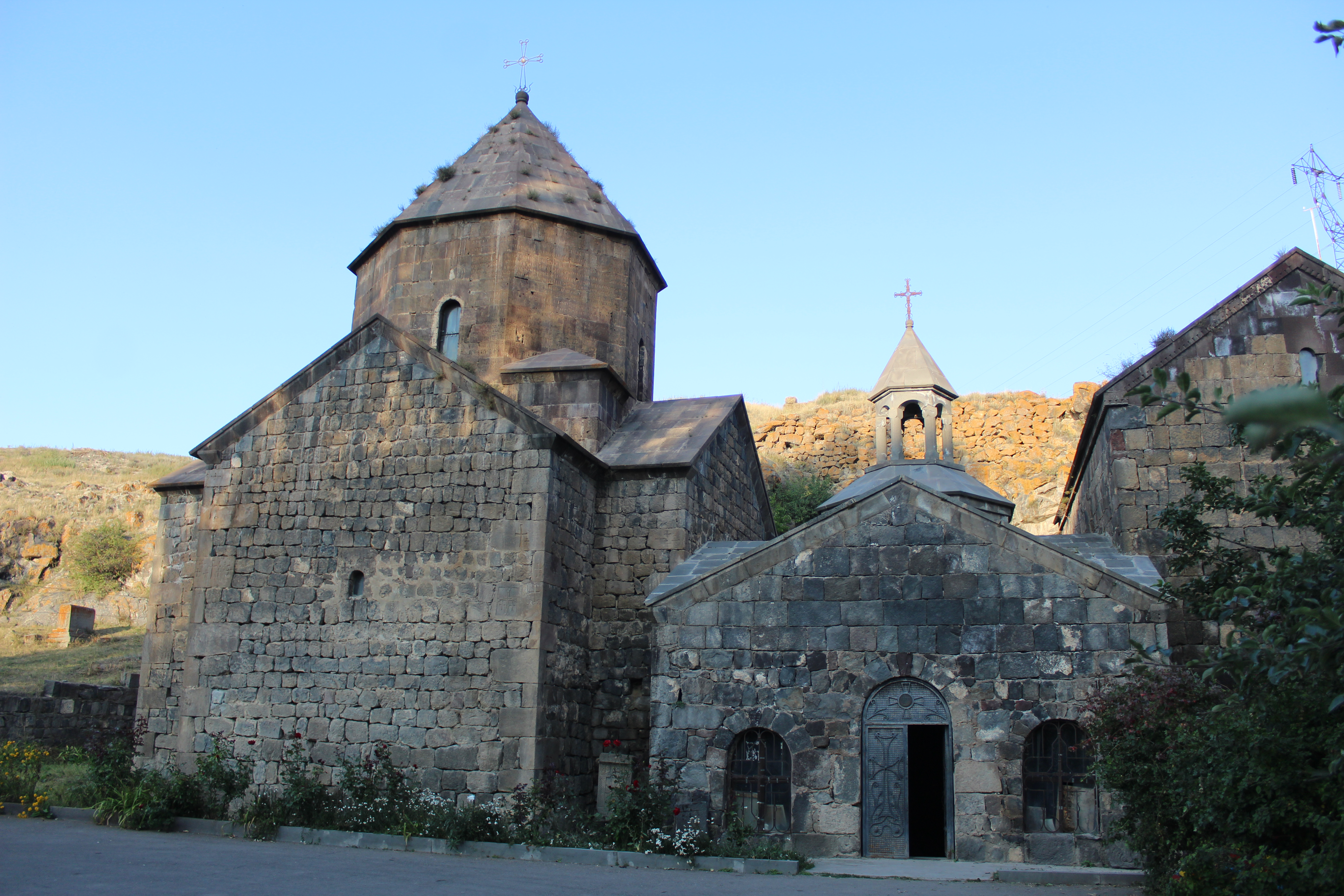
Vanevan Monastery

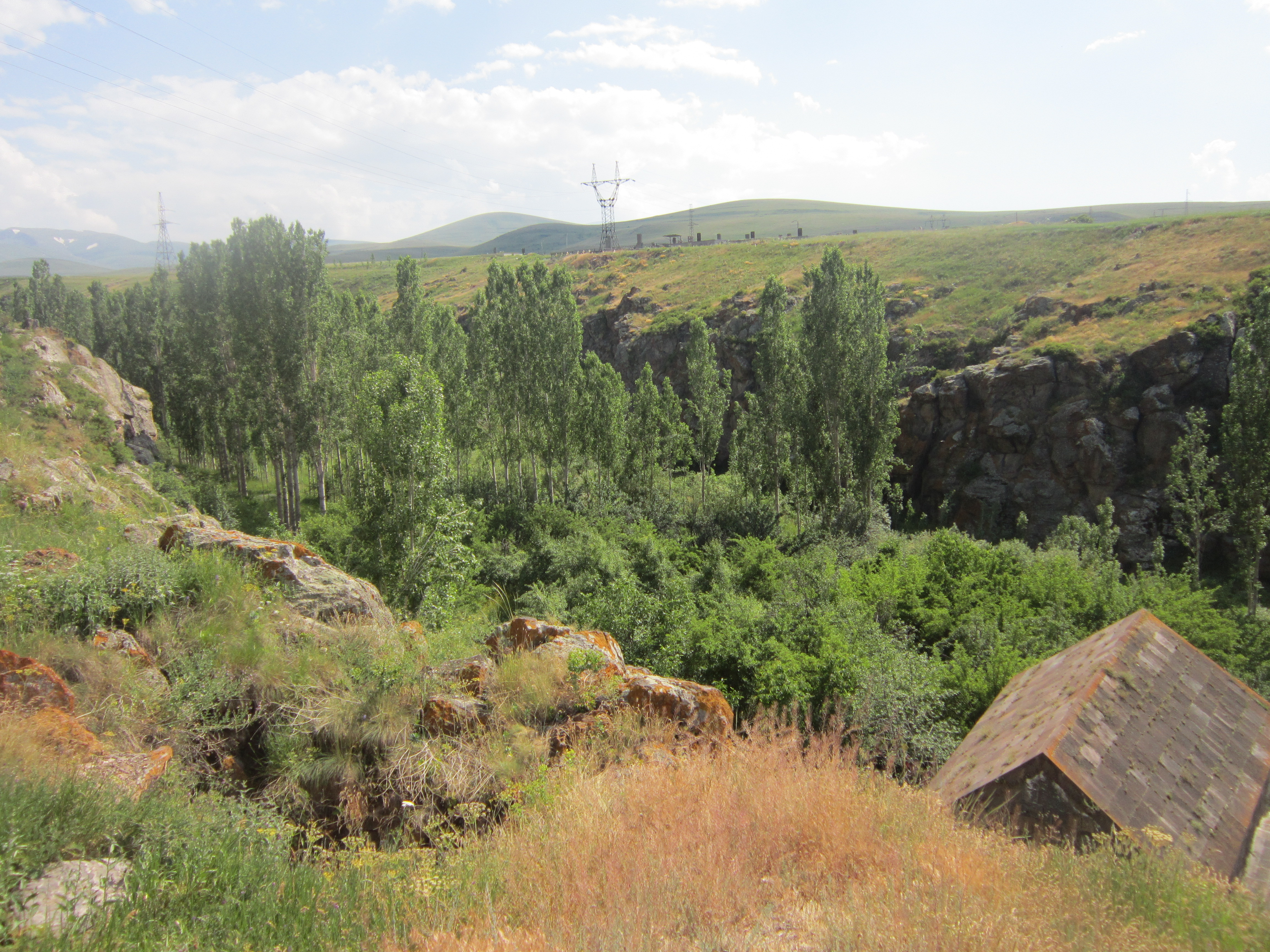
Scenery around Vanevan Monastery

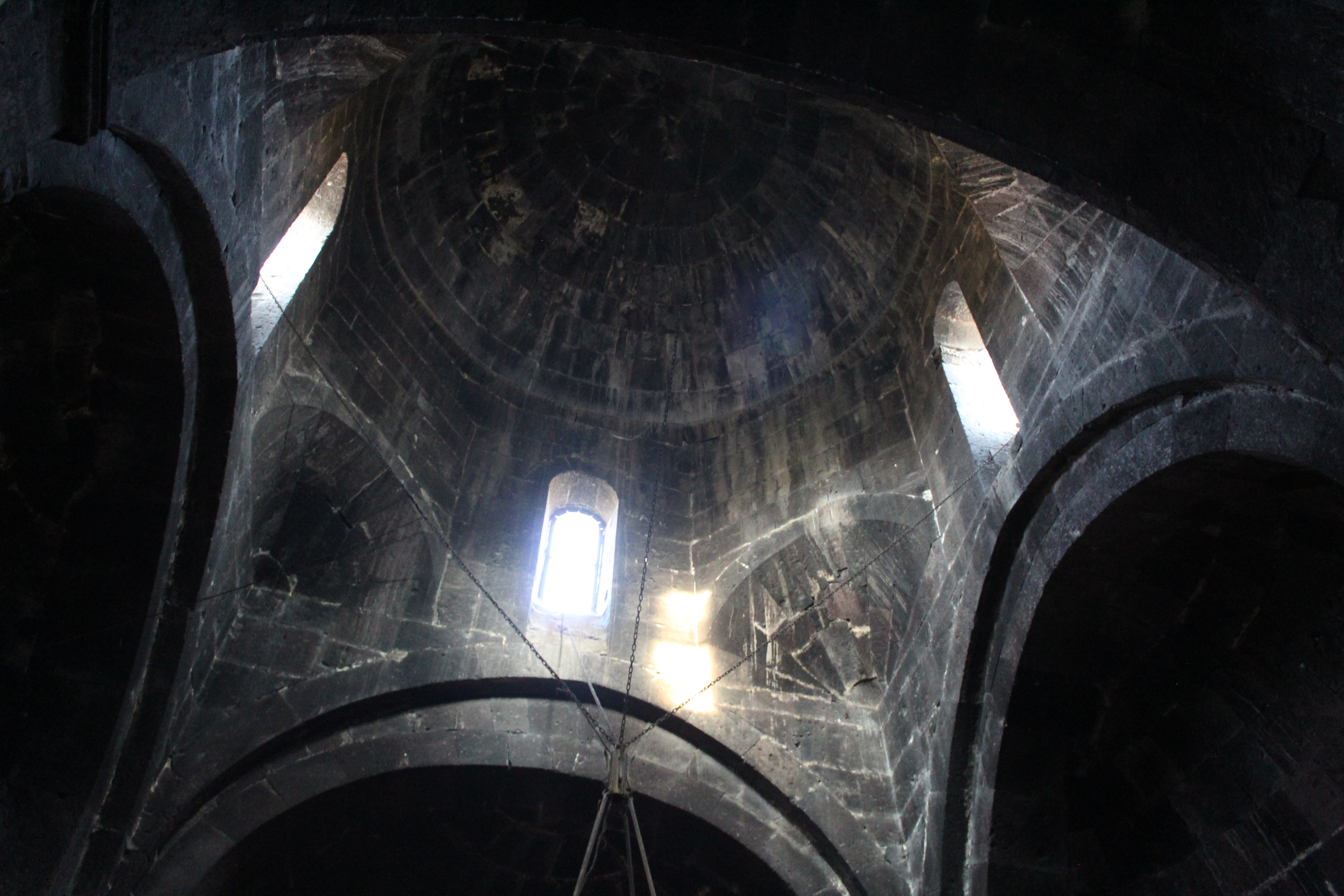
Interior of Vanevan Monastery

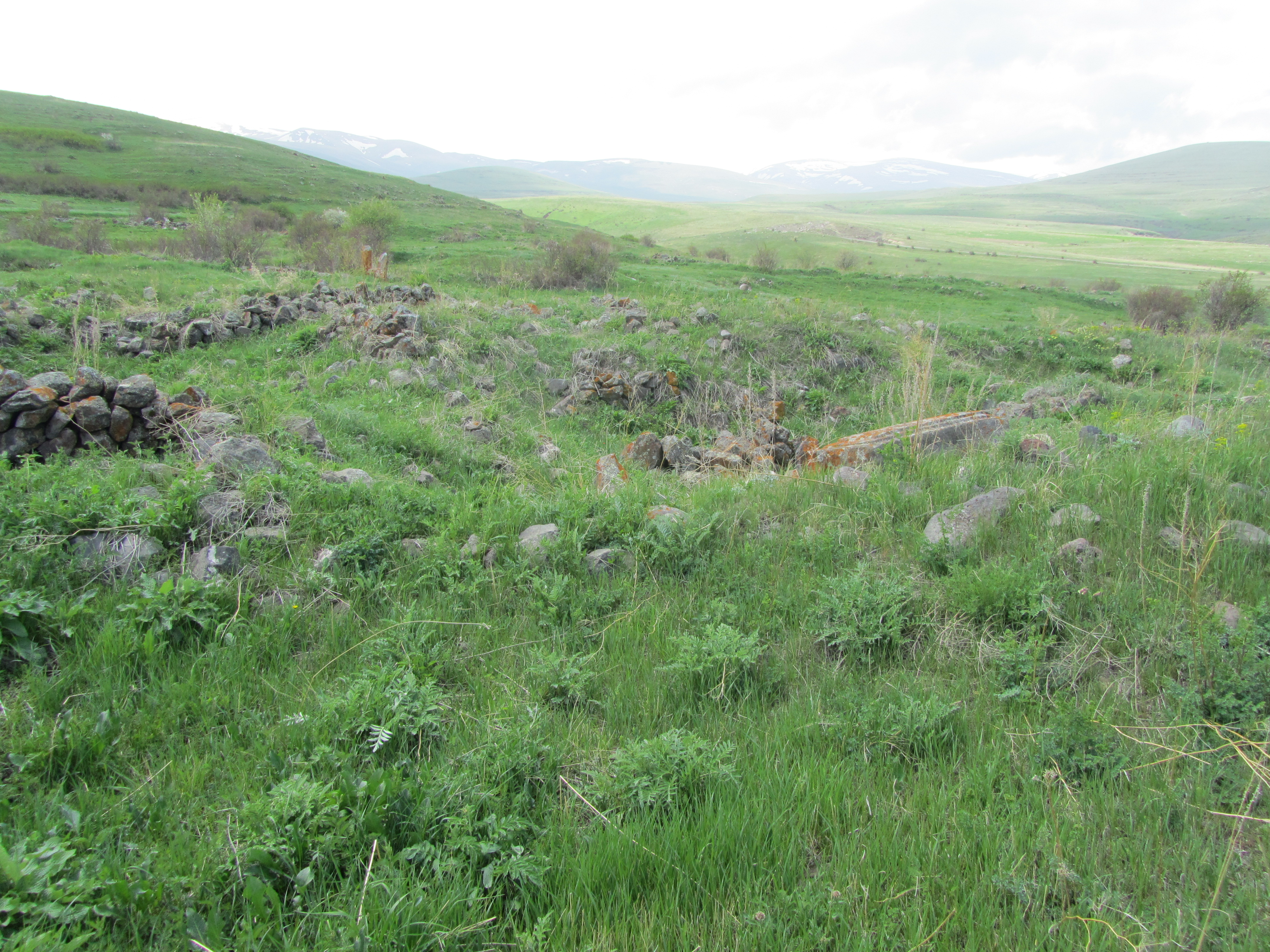
Scenery around Artsvanisti St. Hripsime church

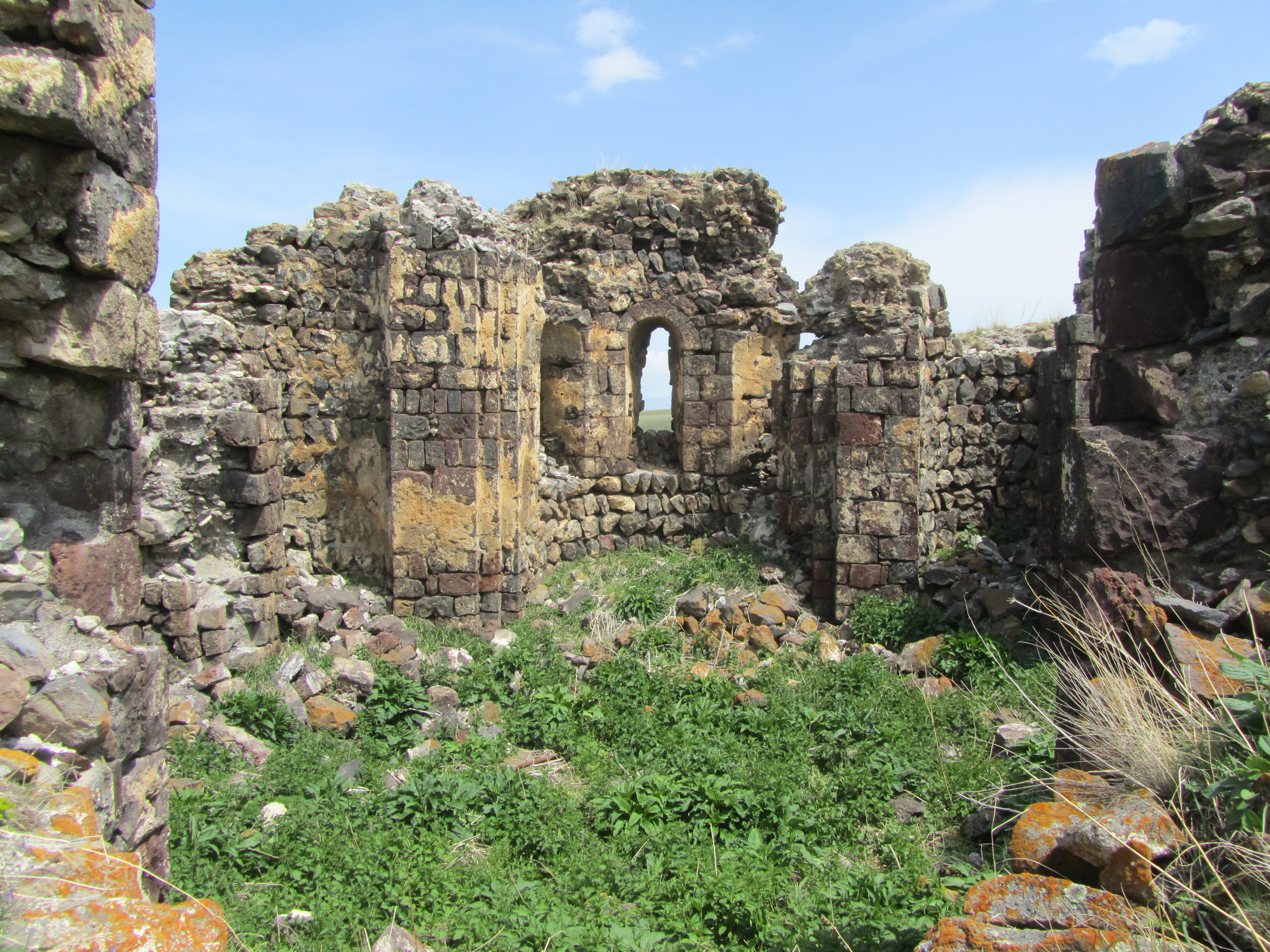
Artsvanisti St. Hripsime church
