= Sahak Sevada =

Prince of Gardman

Sahak Sevada Սահակ Սևադա

Prince of Gardman
- Reign: 895 – 940
- Predecessor: Grigol
- Dynasty: Aranshahik
- Religion: Monophysitism

Sahak Sevada (Armenian: Սահակ Սեւադայ, romanized: Sahak Sewaday (Note: Reformed orthography: Սահակ Սևադա)) was ruler of Gardman between 895–940 and father-in-law of King Ashot II of Armenia. He was the son of Grigol Hamam and brother of Atrnerseh, ruler of Hereti. His possessions covered Parisos, a district of Artsakh, as well as part of Utik-Gardman and Dzoroget.

In Book III of the medieval Armenian text The History of the Country of Albania, Sahak Sevada is described as a "brave and capable man" who was a "lover of letters and appointed writers to his household." The author adds that "Smbat, king of Armenia, fought against him [Sahak Sevada] with zeal and skill, but could not bring him to submission." Sahak's contemporary, Catholicos Hovhannes Draskhanakerttsi, describes him as a man of "great wisdom."

The author of The History of the Country of Albania writes that Sahak Sevada had two sons, Grigor and Davit, and several grandsons and great-grandsons through Grigor, one of whom, John Senekerim, later became ruler of Hereti. Historian Bagrat Ulubabyan considers it more likely that John Senekerim was Sahak Sevada's own son.

Sahak Sevada married one of his daughters to Ashot II, ruler of the Bagratid Kingdom of Armenia. His other daughter Shahandukht was married to Smbat, ishkhan (later king) of Syunik. Sahak aided King Ashot II in an unsuccessful assault against the king's cousin and pretender to the throne, also named Ashot, and in crushing a revolt by Prince Movses of Utik. However, as a result of political changes, Sahak sided with Smbat and revolted against Ashot II and declared independence. During the battle, Sahak and his eldest son Grigor were captured and blinded by Ashot, after which Gardman was likely made a royal domain of the Bagratuni kings.
