= Sahakanuysh =

Sahakanuysh Սահականույշ
- Flag of Bagratuni dynasty

Queen consort of Bagratid Armenia
- Tenure: 914-928
- Died: Mashtots Hayrapet Church (Garni)
- Spouse: Ashot the Iron
- Sahakanuysh Sevada
- House: Aranshahik
- Father: Sahak Sevada
- Religion: Armenian Apostolic Church

Sahakanuysh (Armenian: Սահականույշ, 10th century) was the third Queen of the Bagratid Kingdom and member of Aranshahik Dynasty. She was the wife of the third Bagratuni king - Ashot the Iron (914-928).

Sahakanuysh was the daughter of Prince of Gardman Sahak Sevada. She had two brothers - Grigor the Great, prince of Khachen (Nagorno-Karabakh Republic), and Hovhannes-Senekerim, prince of Parisos. The latter was situated in Utik province of Armenia (nowadays - Azerbaijan). Her sister Shahandukht married to Smbat Syuni, and became the first queen of Syunik kingdom.

Ashot the Iron and Sahakanuysh had no children.

	Sahak Sevada prince of Gardman (895-940)			Smbat Martir king of Armenia (890-914)
Grigor prince of Khachen (940-958)	Hovhannes prince of Parisos (958-1003)	Shahandukht queen of Syunik (987-998)	Sahakanuysh	Ashot king of Armenia (914-928)	Abas king of Armenia (928-953)

== Sources ==
- comm. 59
- КАРАУЛОВ Н. А. Сведения арабских писателей X и XI веков по Р. Хр. о Кавказе, Армении и Адербейджане.
- К. В. Тревер. ОЧЕРКИ ПО ИСТОРИИ И КУЛЬТУРЕ КАВКАЗСКОЙ АЛБАНИИ IV В. ДО Н. Э. — VII В. Н. Э. (источники и литература). Издание Академии наук СССР, М.-Л., 1959
- comm. 144
