= Ishkhanik of Hereti =

Ishkhanik იშხანიკი

King of Hereti
- Reign: 943 – 951
- Predecessor: Adarnase
- Successor: John
- Died: 951
- Issue: John of Hereti
- House: Sumbatishvili
- Father: Adarnase of Hereti
- Mother: Dinar
- Religion: Eastern Orthodox Church

Ishkhanik Sumbatishvili (Georgian: იშხანიკი სუმბათიშვილი; died in 951) was a monarch of the Georgian Kingdom of Hereti during the 10th century. A member of the Sumbatishvili dynasty, founded by his father Adarnase as the senior branch of a powerful South Caucasian noble family, he succeeded his father in 943 and ruled jointly with his mother, Dinar. Together with Queen Dinar, Ishkhanik led Hereti out of the monophysite influence of Armenia and converted the kingdom to Georgian Orthodoxy. His eight-year reign was characterized by closer diplomatic relations with the Georgian Bagrationi dynasty and by a Muslim invasion launched by the Salarids, who temporarily reduced Hereti to vassal status before its liberation around 949.

Some historians identify Ishkhanik with the figure known as “Abulal,” who reportedly governed the region on behalf of Bagrat III of Georgia in 1010.

== Biography ==
=== Early Life and Background ===
Ishkhanik Sumbatishvili was the only known child of Adarnase and Queen Dinar. His father was the first monarch of the Kingdom of Hereti, which he founded in 897 from the remnants of the powerful Aghbano-Armenian principality of Arran, while his mother was the daughter of Duke Adarnase III of Tao and a member of the influential Georgian Bagrationi dynasty. The British historian Donald Rayfield theorizes that Ishkhanik was not Adarnase’s son but rather his brother, making him a younger son of Prince Grigor Hamam. Ishkhanik was baptized into the Albanian Church, a monophysite institution then in theological conflict with the Orthodox world of Byzantium and the rest of Georgia.

=== Accession and Religious Policy ===
Although Adarnase Sumbatishvili was himself monophysite, his political orientation gradually drew closer to the Georgian and Byzantine states. He received the title of patrician from Byzantine and married Princess Dinar in an attempt to form an alliance with her brother, Gurgen II of Tao. It is possible that this pro-Byzantine rapprochement led to his assassination in 943 by the pro-Armenian faction in the region, paving the way for Ishkhanik's accession to the throne. Still young at the time, Ishkhanik was crowned by the Catholicos Sahak of Albania.

The dowager queen Dinar retained considerable influence over her son. She was associated with the throne and converted Ishkhanik to the dyophysite doctrine of the Georgian Orthodox Church. Soon after, the king was recognized by Catholicos Michael III of Iberia and converted his kingdom to Georgian Orthodoxy. This event inspired the 10th-century writer Giorgi Merchule to describe “Great Georgia” as “the union of all lands where the liturgy and prayers are offered in Georgian”.

=== Foreign Relations and Conflicts ===
Ishkhanik's conversion represented not only a major religious transformation for Hereti but also a decisive shift in its foreign policy, moving the kingdom out of Armenia’s sphere of influence and aligning it with the Georgian states and the Byzantine Empire. During his reign, Ishkhanik maintained close relations with Duke Adarnase V of Tao and carefully balanced his diplomacy between the western Bagrationi rulers and the Muslim Sallarid dynasty in the east.

In the 940s, the Sallarids annexed Barda, Dvin, and Ganja, forcing Ishkhanik to pay an annual tribute. Hereti managed to regain its independence when the Sallarid realm fell into civil strife around 949.

It is possible that Ishkhanik also reconquered the towns of Arichi, Gavazi, and Orchobi in the western part of his kingdom, territories that his father had lost during the wars against Kakheti and Abkhazia in the 910s. However, the Georgian Chronicles remain ambiguous on this point and frequently conflate Ishkhanik with his father.

Ishkhanik Sumbatishvili likely died in 951 and was succeeded by his son, John Senekerim, who subsequently fell once again under Armenian influence.

== Identity Debate ==
=== Ishkhanik and Abulal ===
An inscription discovered among the ruins of a church near the Georgian town of Lagodekhi mentions “King Adarnase, Queen Dinar, and King Abulal” as rulers of the region. The archaeologist Gela Kokiashvili has identified the first two as Adarnase Sumbatishvili and Dinar Bagrationi. However, Georgian historiography does not record any monarch named Abulal ruling over Hereti in the 10th century.

According to one interpretation, Abulal may represent an Arabized form of Ishkhanik's name, though this theory remains uncertain since the Arab geographer Ibn Hawqal, a contemporary of Ishkhanik, refers to him by his native Georgian name.

In 1010, sixty years after Ishkhanik's reign, King Bagrat III of Georgia invaded Kakheti—of which Hereti had been a province since the 960s—and appointed a certain Abulal as governor of Hereti, suggesting that he was a local noble. A modern hypothesis proposes that Ishkhanik and this Abulal were in fact the same person, ruling Hereti on behalf of the Georgian crown. However, this identification fails to explain the chronological gap between Ishkhanik's presumed death in 951 and the later mention of Abulal in 1010.

== Family ==
The name of his wife is not recorded, although some medieval Georgian chroniclers mistakenly identify Dinar as his spouse. Ishkhanik was succeeded by at least one known son, John Senekerim.

== Bibliography ==
- Brosset, Marie-Félicité (1856). Histoire de la Géorgie de l'Antiquité jusqu'au xixe siècle, " Histoire moderne " [History of Georgia from Ancient Times to the 19th Century, Modern History] (in French). Saint-Petersburg: Imperial Academy of Sciences.
- Brosset, Marie-Félicité (1849). Histoire de la Géorgie depuis l'Antiquité jusqu'au XIXe siècle. Volume I [History of Georgia from Ancient Times to the 19th Century, Volume 1] (in French). Saint-Petersburg: Imperial Academy of Sciences.
- Rayfield, Donald (2012). Edge of Empires, a History of Georgia. London: Reaktion Books. ISBN 978-1-78023-070-2.
- Muskhelishvili, D. (2014). History of Georgia (PDF) (in Georgian). Tbilisi. p. 363.
- Antidze, Nikoloz (2019). Online Archaeology (PDF) (in Georgian). Tbilisi: Georgian Agency of Cultural Heritage. p. 250.

Preceded by Adarnase	King of Hereti; 943–951	Succeeded by John
