= Tsanareti =

Historic district in the early medieval Caucasus

Tsanareti წანარეთი
- 7th century–8th century
- Tsanaretis Khevi in modern international borders of Georgia
- Common languages: Georgian
- Religion: Georgian Orthodox
- Government: Principality
- History
  - Established: 7th century
  - Disestablished: 8th century
Preceded by	Succeeded by
Kingdom of Iberia	Principality of Kakheti

Tsanareti (Georgian: წანარეთი; alternative spellings: Tsanaria, Canaria, Sanaria, Sanaryia) was a historic district (Khevi) in the early medieval Caucasus, lying chiefly in what is now the northeastern corner in Georgia’s region of Mtskheta-Mtianeti.

== History ==
In the narrow sense of the term Tsanareti (reduced later simply to Khevi) was applied by the medieval Georgian annals to the area around the Darial Pass, inhabited by the Tsanars. This warlike tribe was already known as the Sanars to Ptolemy. According to the 8th century Arab historian Masudi, the Tsanars, though Christians, "claim to be descended from the Arabs, namely from Nizār b. Maʿadd b. Muḍar, and a branch (fakhdh) of ʿUqayl, settled there since olden times". Although this claim is completely rejected by modern scholars, the origins of the Tsanars are still uncertain today. The tribe is sometimes claimed to be an offshoot of Sarmatians. Vladimir Minorsky believes, however, that they were Nakh-speakers. Georgian historians Sargis Kakabadze, Mariam Lortkipanidze and others connect them with the Svans or with Georgians in general.

Whatever their origin, the Tsanars seem to have adopted, over the centuries, many features of Georgian culture, including language and religion, being subsequently completely commingled with the Georgian people to form one of its ethnographic groups Mokheves.

In struggle against the Arab occupation Tsanars staged a powerful uprising in the 770s and, according to Ya'qubi, requested help from the Byzantines, Khazars and the as-Saqāliba. The rebellious tribe soon became a dominant force in the historical Kakheti region and played a crucial role, circa 787, in the formation of the principality of Kakheti ruled by a prince with the title of Chorepiscopus. For all practical purposes, the contemporary Arab sources used the word Sanãryia to designate the principality in general. However, the Tsanars seem to have been significantly weakened by the early 9th century, enabling their rival clan of the Gardabanians to install their chief Vache as a Chorepiscopus of Kakheti in the 830s. By the end of the 10th century, Tsanareti fell under the kingdom of Hereti, whose king John Senekerim adopted the title of "King of the Tsanars".

== See also ==
- History of Georgia
- Khevi

== Bibliography ==
- Rapp S.H. Jr., Studies in Medieval Georgian Historiography: Early Texts and Eurasian Contexts, Peeters Bvba (September 25, 2003), ISBN 90-429-1318-5, pp 398–9
- Minorsky V. F., History of Shirvan and Derbent in the 9th-11th centuries. Moscow, 1963, pp 210–211 (Russian)
- Lordkipanidze M. D., Political Unification of Feudal Georgia, 1963, p 140 (Georgian)
- Berdzenishvili N. A., Issues in the History of Georgia, vol. 9, Tbilisi, 1983, p 60 (Georgian)
