= The Tale of Tsaritsa Dinara =

"The Tale of Tsaritsa Dinara" (Russian: Повесть об царице Динаре, Povest’ o tsaritsa Dinare) is the 16th-century Russian story of Saint Dinara, a Christian queen (Russian: tsaritsa) of Hereti (eastern Georgia), who is glorified as a pious helmswoman renowned for her wisdom and valor. Composed before 1553, the tale enjoyed a popularity during the second half of the 16th century and probably reflected the memory of Queen Tamar of Georgia (reigned from 1184 to 1213) who presided over the “Golden Age” of medieval Georgia, when her kingdom won a number of victories over the neighboring Muslim states.

The principal part of the tale focuses on the struggle of Dinara against the king of Persia who demands a tribute from her, and threatens to remove her from the throne in case of noncompliance. The queen meritoriously refuses to comply, replying that the king of Persia cannot usurp the power bestowed upon her by the Lord. In a fiery speech, Dinara encourages her hesitant nobles and, after a pilgrimage to a monastery, marches to meet the Persians. An armored-clad queen, riding a galloping white steed and holding an upraised sword, leads an army into battle, wins a crushing victory, and has the Persian king decapitated.
