= Adarnase of Hereti =

Adarnase Sumbatishvili

King of Hereti
- Tenure: 897–943
- Predecessor: Grigor Hamam
- Successor: Ishkhanik
- Died: 943
- Spouse: Dinar
- Issue: Ishkhanik
- House: Sumbatishvili
- Father: Grigor Hamam
- Religion: Monophysitism

Adarnase Sumbatishvili (Georgian: ადარნასე სუმბათიშვილი, romanized: adarnase sumbatishvili), also known as Atrnerseh (Armenian: Ատրներսեհ) was a South Caucasus prince of the 10th century who founded the Kingdom of Hereti in 897.

He inherited a part of the domains of his father, Prince Grigor Hamam, out of which he founded Hereti as an independent kingdom, as well as the Sumbatishvili dynasty. He ruled over a chaotic period in the history of the region and faced several enemies, including the Principality of Kakheti, the Kingdom of Abkhazia and the Emirate of Tiflis. Adarnase ruled with the title of king for most of his reign, except for a short time during which he was forced to accept Byzantine suzerainty.

== Family origins ==
The origins of Adarnase are disputed amongst modern historians. Marie-Félicité Brosset, who studied the Caucasus in the 19th century, believed that Adarnase came from a cadet scion of the Bagrationi dynasty, the family that was already governed several other Georgian territories at the time. According to this version, Adarnase was a descendant of a younger brother of Prince Guaram I of Iberia, himself the founder of the Bagrationi dynasty according to medieval chronicler Juansher Juansheriani. However, this version of the origins of the Bagrationi family is rejected by modern genealogists, who make Guaram and his brothers member of the Chosroid dynasty, an ancient royal dynasty of Iberia. Brosset himself believed that Adarnase may have been a descendant of the cadet branch of the Chosroids that may have inherited Eastern Georgia in the 5th century.

However, modern historians assume that Adarnase was a local prince, maybe son of Grigor Hamam, a powerful prince in the region and heir to the Mihranid dynasty, the family that governed Albania and Eastern Armenia. Adarnase could thus be a member of three potential houses: the Bagrationis, the Guaramids, or the Mihranids. The Albano-Armenian theory is mostly accepted today, Adarnase being the first independent sovereign of Hereti, which was most likely an Armenian territory beforehand and followed the Monophysitism of Albanians and Armenians instead of the Christian Orthodoxy of the Bagrationis.

Historian and an expert on the ancient history of the South Caucasus, Robert H. Hewsen, considers Atrnerseh and his father as members of a branch of the Armenian House of Syunik. Based on this version, he was the son of Grigor Hamam, himself a grandson of the Armenian noble Sahl Smbatean, who governed a principality in the Karabakh. Sahl Smbatyan may have been a descendant of the Armenian family of the Arranshahiks, which disappeared in the 4th century at the hands of the Mihranids. Another, less accepted version treats Sahl Smbatean as a member of the Siunid princely family. No matter which version is true, the descendants of Adarnase remain known today as the Sumbatishvilis (Georgian translation of "Smbatean", or "children of Sumbat").

== Biography ==
Based on the most widespread theory, Adarnase was the oldest son of Grigor Hamam, a Mihranid prince controlling large swaths of lands in Eastern Transcaucasia, from Lake Sevan to Partav. At the death of his father in 897, he shared the inheritance with his four brothers and took control of Hereti, although he was the only one to keep the title of King. He governed over an ethnically diverse kingdom, the region being populated by Georgians, Armenians, and Albanians. A monophysite, he faced the pressure of the Byzantine Empire and Georgian states, while establishing Shaki as his capital and naming his state the Kingdom of Shaki-Cambysen (named after two regions of ancient Albania).

He married Princess Dinar Bagrationi, a daughter of Georgian duke Adarnase VII of Tao. She was an Orthodox Christian who imported her religion in the new kingdom. The Atrnerseh of Armenian sources thus became King Adarnase of Hereti in Georgian texts and, though he remained a monophysite throughout his reign, Queen Dinar converted the kingdom to Georgian Orthodoxy after his death.

Adarnase quickly found himself at odds with his western neighbors, who feared the rise of a new king in the region. As early as 906, the Principality of Kakheti and the Kingdom of Abkhazia formed an alliance to rule over central Georgia. Moreover, Chorepiscopus Kvirike I of Kakheti decided to ally himself to Emir Jaffar I of Tiflis and put pressure on Hereti. Adarnase was forced to abandon the title of king and accepted instead the Byzantine title of patrician of Hereti, although this maneuver was not enough to appease the Georgian powers.

In 915, Abkhazia and Kakheti invaded Hereti, King Constantine III of Abkhazia capturing the majority of strategic fortresses in the region. In the spring, the allies besieged Vezhini, where the patrician had found refuge, with the Abkhazians attacking from the north and the Kakhetians capturing the south. On April 16, 915 (Good Friday), with Vezhini at the brink of falling, Adarnase admitted defeated and came out to negotiate peace. He ceded Arishi and Gavazi to Abkhazia and Orchobi to Kakheti, after which the invaders retreated.

In the 920s, he used the Abbasid invasion of Kakheti to remove Hereti from Georgian influence. Adarnase once again proclaimed himself king and recaptured the towns he lost in 915. He died in 943, leaving his throne to his son Ishkhanik.

Medieval chronicler Leontius of Ruisi's writings have caused confusion on the length of his reign. According to him, Ishkhanik succeeded his father in the 920s, but earlier sources confirm a reign that lasted till 943 for Adarnase. Leontius also mistakenly makes Queen Dinar a wife of Ishkhanik and not Adarnase.

== Family ==
Adarnase Sumbatishvili married Princess Dinar Bagrationi, a daughter of Duke Adarnase VII of Tao. They had one son:

- Ishkhanik Sumbatishvili, king of Hereti.

== Bibliography ==
- Brosset, Marie-Félicité (1849). Histoire de la Géorgie depuis l'Antiquité jusqu'au XIXe siècle. Volume I [History of Georgia from Ancient Times to the 19th Century, Volume 1] (in French). Saint-Petersburg: Imperial Academy of Sciences.
- Brosset, Marie-Félicité (1856). Histoire de la Géorgie de l'Antiquité jusqu'au xixe siècle, "Histoire moderne" [History of Georgia from Ancient Times to the 19th Century, Modern History] (in French). Saint-Petersburg: Imperial Academy of Sciences.
- Brosset, Marie-Félicité (1851). Additions et éclaircissements à l'Histoire de la Géorgie, Addition IX [Additions and Clarifications to the History of Georgia, Addition IX] (in French). Saint-Petersburg: Imperial Academy of Sciences.
- Chorbajian, Levon (1994). The Caucasian Knot - The History and Geo-Politics of Nagorno-Karabakh. London: Zed Books.
