= Khevi (disambiguation) =

Khevi (ხევი) is a Georgian word for “gorge”. It may refer to

- Khevi, an administrative-territorial unit in ancient and medieval Georgia
- Khevi, a small historical-geographic area in northeastern Georgia
- Khevi, a village in the Ozurgeti district, Guria region
- Khevi, a village in the Chokhatauri district, Guria region
