= Dinar of Hereti =

Queen Dinar
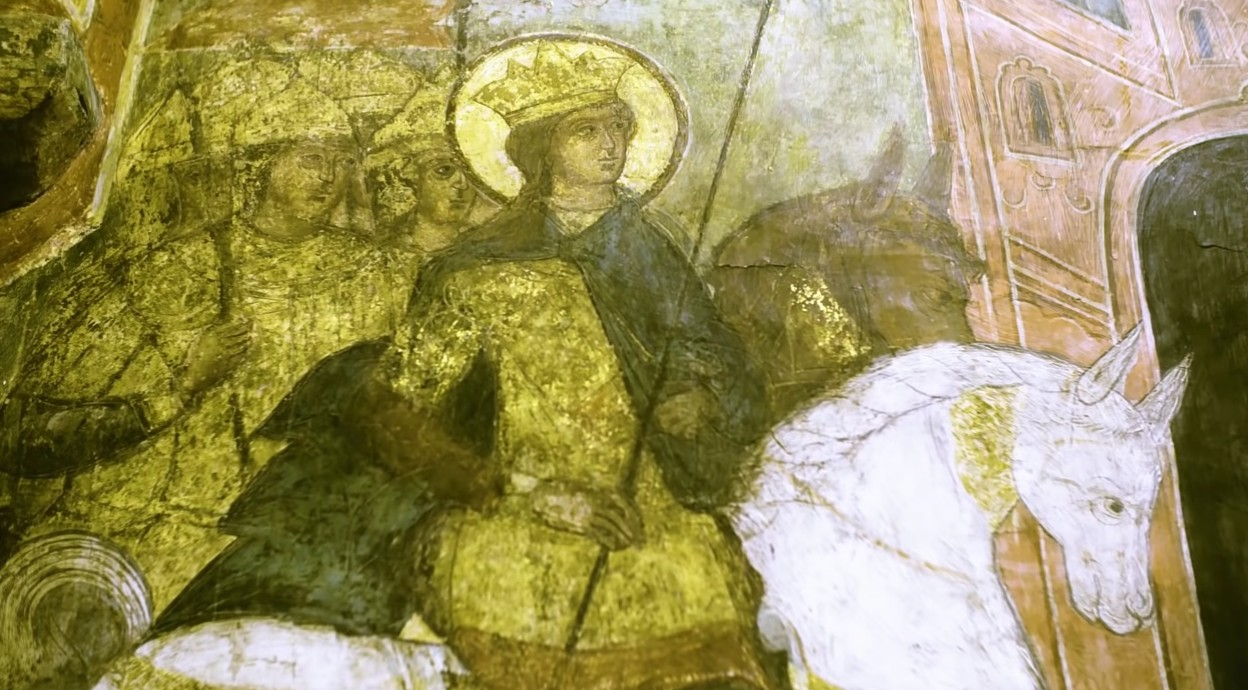
- Fresco of Dinar at the Tsarina's Golden Chamber of Moscow Kremlin

Queen of Hereti
- Reign: c. 1010s
- Predecessor: John
- Successor: Monarchy abolished

Queen mother of Hereti
- Tenure: 943 – c. 965

Queen consort of Hereti
- Tenure: ? – 943
- Spouse: Adarnase
- Issue: Ishkhanik
- Dynasty: Bagrationi dynasty
- Father: Adarnase III
- Religion: Georgian Orthodox Church

Dinar (Georgian: დინარ დედოფალი, romanized: dinar dedopali) was a Georgian princess of the Bagrationi dynasty of Tao-Klarjeti and Queen regnant of Hereti in the 11th century.

== Life ==
Dinar was a daughter of hereditary ruler of Tao-Klarjeti, the eristavt-eristavi, "duke of dukes" Adarnase III of Tao by his unknown wife.

According to The Georgian Chronicles, Queen Dinar, during the reign of her son Ishkhanik, converted Hereti to the Georgian Orthodox Church.

King Ishkhanik and Queen Dinar participated in the ceremony organized on the occasion of the election of the new Catholicos of Albania in 962.

After 1000, Queen Dinar of Hereti had no option but to join a united Georgia under King Bagrat. When the campaign of Bagrat III to the Kingdom of Hereti, the main representative of the Hereti ruling circles was Queen Dinar. Bagrat III captured her and she must have been over 90 years old.

G. M. Grigoryan believes that the grave discovered in the territory of the Vahanavank Monastery near the city of Kapan, with the word "Dinar" written on it in the Armenian alphabet, is the grave of Queen Dinar.

She is venerated as a saint. The Georgian Orthodox Church commemorates her on June 30.

== In Russia ==
Queen Dinar's story is recounted in Russian chronicles more closely and The Tale of Tsaritsa Dinara may be about her.

On the north wall of the Throne Hall in the Moscow Kremlin, there is a fresco of Queen Dinar who is depicted as being mounted on a white horse, victorious over the enemy.
