= Sahl Smbatean =

Sahl Smbatean (Armenian: Սահլ Սմբատեան, Arabic: سهل بن سنباط, romanized: Sahl ibn Sunbāṭ; died after 855) was an Armenian prince of Arran and Shaki who played a considerable role in the history of the eastern Caucasus during the 9th century and was the ancestor of the House of Khachen established in 821.

== Name ==
He is called Sahl-i Smbatean Eranshahik (Note: The -i here is a reflection of a Persian ezafe construction.) ('Sahl Aranshahik, son of Smbat') in the Albanian history of Movses Kaghankatvatsi. Arabic sources call him Sahl ibn Sunbat ('Sahl, son of Sunbat'), also spelled Sunbadh. Vladimir Minorsky writes that Ibn Sunbat / Smbatean "may be his family name rather than a direct patronymic". Smbat is an Armenian name related to Persian Sinbad. Sahl appears to be an Arabic name he adopted, not his true Christian name. In Michael the Syrian's chronicle, Sahl is called Isaac (Sahak in Armenian), so Bagrat Ulubabyan concludes that Sahl is a corruption of Sahak. Atrnerseh, identified by some scholars as Sahl's son, is called Adharnarse ibn Ishaq (i.e., son of Isaac) in Tabari's history.

== Origins and descendants ==
Movses Kaghankatvatsi refers to Sahl Smbatean as Aranshahik and as a descendant of Zarmihr ("of the Zarmirhakan family of kings"). (Note: Ulubabyan reads Armihr instead of Zarmihr.) The Aranshahiks were the first known royal dynasty of Caucasian Albania. (Note: The Armenian historical tradition, as recorded in the histories of Movses Khorenatsi and Movses Kaghankatvatsi, holds the Aranshahiks to be descended from Sisak, the legendary ancestor of the Syunids. This may be a 5th-century AD addition onto an older legend.) They lost the Albanian throne in the 1st century AD, and in the 6th century they were nearly annihilated by the Mihranids of Gardman, who in the 7th century became rulers of all of Caucasian Albania. The only Aranshahik survivor was Zarmihr, who was married to a Mihranid princess. Charles Dowsett writes, "One cannot exclude the possibility, however, of this eminently respectable Albanian genealogy having been falsely assumed by Sahl or invented by the historian [Movses Kaghankatvatsi] or his source in an attempt to legitimize Sahl's claim to the throne of Albania." Cyril Toumanoff suggests that Sahl was of mixed Bagratid and Aranshahik descent. Alison Vacca writes that Sahl's ancestor Zarmihr belonged to a different branch of the Mihranid dynasty, and thus Sahl too was a Mihranid. She states that the two arguments for identifying Sahl as an Armenian are that 1) the Mihranids intermarried with Armenians; and 2) Arabic sources call him Armenian, but she notes that Arabic sources tended not to identify people as Albanian or Parthian (the Mihranids were of Parthian origin).

Based on Tovma Artsruni's statement that Sahl was the ruler of "Shake", Minorsky concluded the Shaki, located north of the Kura River, was Sahl's original holding, and by 835 he had rebelled against Arab rule and taken control of Arran. The Georgian Chronicles refer to three brothers in the 7th-8th centuries who came from Taron and took control of "Shakikh"; Minorsky takes this as a possible reference to Sahl's ancestors' arrival in Shaki. Bagrat Ulubabyan writes that Artsruni's statement is erroneous and that Sahl should not be associated with Shaki at all; his only territories were in Khachen (in modern-day Nagorno-Karabakh) and the surrounding areas. Aleksan Hakobyan likewise believes that Artsruni's information is incorrect and that Shake here is a corruption of Khachen. According to the historian Robert H. Hewsen, Sahl was a Syunid prince. After the death of the Syunid prince Vasak II in 821, Sahl was unhappy with the division of the inheritance, so he seized Gegharkunik from the Syunid family domains and established a princedom for himself.

In Movses Kaghankatvatsi's history, Atrnerseh, the ruler of Khachen and ancestor of that principality's ruling line, is called the son of Sahl. Bagrat Ulubabyan, Robert Hewsen, and others accept this identification, but Minorsky distinguishes Sahl Smbatean from Atrnerseh's father, whose real name is supposed to have been Sahak. Atrnerseh married Spram, the daughter of the murdered Mihranid prince Varaz-Trdat, and he was the ancestor of the main rulers of Arran. (Note: Toumanoff writes of the later rulers of Shaki and Hereti, such as Grigor Hamam, that "there seems to be no reason for not considering them to have been of the family of Sahl." Ulubabyan believed Grigor Hamam to be Atrnerseh's son and therefore Sahl's grandson.) Sahl had a son who was apparently known to the Arabs as Mu'awiya and to the Armenians as Hovhannes. In Ulubabyan's view, he probably ruled in the district of Metsarank, centered on modern-day Gandzasar. According to Aleksan Hakobyan, it was Sahl's other son, Atrnerseh, who was known to the Arabs as Mu'awiya.

== Reign ==
In Armenian sources, Sahl Smbatean and his brothers are remembered for their successful battles against enemy invaders in the mountains of Artsakh. According to the Arabic History of Sharvan, a rebellion occurred in Shaki sometime after 820. In 822–823, Sahl defeated an Arab force from Barda that had destroyed Amaras and invaded Metsarank. The Arab rule in the region was substantially weakened due to the revolt of Babak Khorramdin in Iranian Azerbaijan (822–837). Babak married the daughter of Vasak, Prince of Syunik, and fought with him against the Islamic conquest of Persia. However, after the death of Vasak (in 822), Babak tried to dominate Syunik and Artsakh, and in 826-831 committed atrocities against the revolted Armenians of Balk, Gegharkunik and Lachin (the three cantons of Syunik). In that account, Babak was described as "the murderous, world-ravaging, bloodthirsty beast" by the Armenian historiographer Movses Kaghankatvatsi. The Armenians continued the struggle against Babak in the cantons of Artsakh, but Sahl's name is not mentioned in connection with these battles. According to Minorsky, the interests of Sahl and Babak may have initially coincided. After the arrival of Afshin, the prominent general of the Abbasid Caliph al-Mutasim, in Azerbaijan in 835, Sahl ambushed and defeated an Arab army.

In 837, Afshin defeated Babak's forces. Babak sought to escape to Byzantium through the territories of the Armenian princes, and he took refuge with Sahl, who initially treated him with honor. However, Sahl soon surrendered Babak to Afshin. For this, he received great honors, and his earlier actions against the Arabs were ignored. According to al-Masudi, Sahl received as a reward a royal robe, a crown, a horse, and exemption from tribute; per Charles Dowsett, all of this "amounts to an official investiture as ruler of Albania." The exemption from tribute was effectively an acceptance of the status quo created when Sahl revolted against Arab rule. The later Armenian historian Vardan Areveltsi mentions only a monetary reward for Sahl. According to Movses Kaghankatvatsi, the Caliphate assigned him sovereign over Armenia, Georgia and Albania, although per Dowsett and Minorsky this is a great exaggeration.

== Exile ==
In 854, according to Tovma Artsruni, Sahl Smbatean and many other princes of Armenia (including Atrnerseh of Khachen and Esayi Abu-Muse of Ktish) were captured by Bugha al-Kabir, the Turkish commander of the Abbasid Caliph Al-Mutawakkil, and exiled to Samarra. Tabari instead writes that it was a son of Sahl named Mu'awiya who was deported. Atrnerseh would soon return to Sodk; the fate of Sahl Smbatean is unknown, although he died sometime after 855.

== See also ==
- Esayi Abu-Muse
