= Prince Arran =

Progenitor of Aranshahik dynasty

Prince Arran or Arhan was a semi-legendary founder of Caucasian Albania. The early Armenian historian Movses Khorenatsi tells of a certain Aran, a descendant of the legendary Armenian patriarch Hayk through Sisak. According to Movses Kagankatvatsi he was 9th generation descendant of Japheth. He is regarded as progenitor of Aranshahik dynasty. According to a legendary tradition reported by Khorenatsi, Arran was a descendant of Sisak, the ancestor of neighboring Armenian province Syunik. Almost no information exists about him and his successors except names. He was contemporary of Abraham according to Movses Kagankatvatsi which seems to be a legend.

Arran Aranshahik
Regnal titles
Vacant Title last held by Title created	King of Caucasian Albania	Succeeded by Aray
