= Atrnerseh =

Armenian ruler of Khachen

Atrnerseh Ատրներսեհ
- Prince of Khachen
- Reign: 840–865
- Predecessor: Sahl Smbatean
- Successor: Grigor Hamam
- Spouse: Spram
- Dynasty: Arranshahik, Syunik
- Religion: Monophysitism

Atrnerseh (Armenian: Ատրներսեհ) was an Armenian ruler of the Principality of Khachen. He was the son and successor of Sahl Smbatean.

According to the 10th century Armenian historian Movses Kaghankatvatsi, Atrnerseh's family was descended from the Arranshahiks, the ancient ruling dynasty of Caucasian Albania, although the historian Robert H. Hewsen considers Atrnerseh and his father as members of a branch of the Armenian House of Syunik. In 822, Atrnerseh married the last heir of Mihranid dynasty (which previously ruled Caucasian Albania), princess Spram. Subsequently, the princedom of Atrnerseh's father Sahl expanded to the east and included the territories of Artsakh and Gardman.

Atrnerseh's possessions mainly covered the region of Upper Khachen, also known as Tsar. His residence was at Handaberd, a fortress he built in the second quarter of the 9th century. Together with his father and brother John, he participated in the anti-Arab uprising of 854, as a result of which he was arrested by the Arab commander Bugha al-Turki and sent to exile in Samarra. However, he was freed from exile, unlike his brother, whose estates were inherited by Atrnerseh. Atrnerseh ruled over an area approximately corresponding to the historical Armenian province of Artsakh.
