= Khevisberi =

Elected spiritual and communal leader of Georgian highland communities

Khevisberi (Georgian: ხევისბერი; lit. "an elder of the gorge") secular and ecclesiastical ruler of a Khevi in the Eastern Georgian highlands: He is an elderly man who follows a monk-like life. Khevisberi performs different rituals and ceremonies and supervises brewing of the sacred beer.

Historically, Georgian patriarchal highlander communities enjoyed a degree of autonomy and they were not integrating into the feudal system. they were rather electing their own council of elders and leaders, known as Khevisberi who functioned as a judge, priest and military leader and submitted themselves only to the Georgian monarchs.

the khevisberi, far more than any distant priest or power, who directed the spiritual, ritual and moral affairs of the mountains. He was and is elected by his peers, not on the basis of age or wealth, but for his deeper qualities [specialized ritual, mythological, and esoteric knowledge inherited from his ancestors]. Sometimes his office is given to him in dreams. He decides on all questions of law, presides over festivals and sacred ceremonies; he, alone, approaches the shrine and undertakes the sacrifice and in so doing brings peace to the dead and placates the deities.

== In popular culture ==
- Alexander Kazbegi's novel "Khevisberi Gocha";(in Georgian)
- the 1964 film "Khevisberi Gocha (1964)" based on Alexander Kazbegi's novel.

== Sources ==
- R. Metreveli, Georgian Soviet Encyclopedia, XI, p. 451, Tbilisi, 1986
