= Vahanavank =

Monastic Complex in Armenia

- Վահանավանք
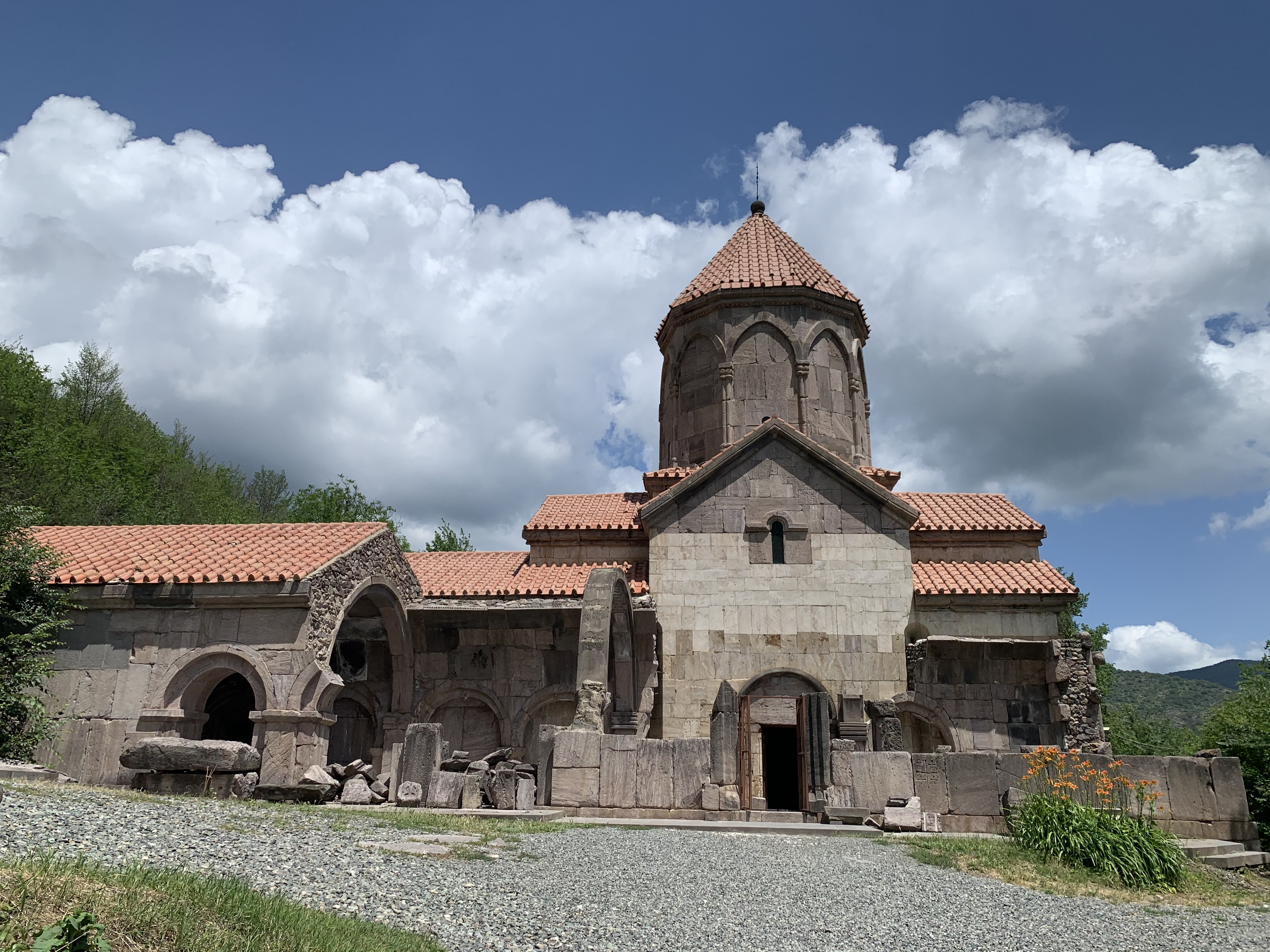
- Vahanavank

- Location within Armenia Location within Syunik Province

Religion
- Affiliation: Armenian Apostolic Church

Location
- Location: Near Kapan, Syunik Province, Armenia
- Coordinates: 39.217778°N 46.331944°E

Architecture
- Style: Armenian
- Completed: 10th-11th centuries

Vahanavank (Armenian: Վահանավանք) is a 10th-11th century Armenian Apostolic cathedral located approximately 5 kilometers west of the town of Kapan in the Syunik Province of Armenia, situated at the foot of Tigranasar mountain along the right bank of the Voghdji River.

== History ==
The monastery was built over a Bronze Age grave field (13.-11. BCE) by Prince Vahan Nakhashinogh, from which it gets its namesake, the son of Prince Gagik of Kapan in the early 10th century. The Armenian historian Stepanos Orbelian (c. 1250 – 1305) wrote that the prince had taken on a monk's robe and lifestyle to cure himself of demonic possession. In the year 911, Prince Vahan gathered 100 like-minded clerics and built the church of Surb Grigor Lusavorich. It is the oldest among the structures at Vahanavank. The church is a domed hall like building with a main temple and a pair of sacristies. The drum rises on huge steeple rocks. The church has a west and south entrance. Prince Vahan was buried near the door to the church.

A spiritual school was opened at the monastery where young boys from Baghk and other provinces studied. Prince Vahan Nakhashinogh's nephew Vahan Jevanshir II, was educated at the monastery and rose to become the Bishop of Syunik around 940 and then Catholicos around the year 960. He built many great monuments during his reign, many of which remain in ruins.

The vestibule and portico first half of the 10th century. The latter stretches to the south of the church and the narthex. Kings and princes of Syunik are buried here. The cornices of the vestibule are decorated with vegetal and animal ornamental motives which border the southern and northern walls.

Vahanavank became the religious center for the kings of Syunik in the 11th century. In 1086, Queen Shahandukht II of Syunik and her sister Katan built the church of Surb Astvatsatsin as a burial site for her and her relatives. They also constructed the southern entrance to the monastery as well as the vestibule to S. Astvatsatsin.

There are other structures, household buildings, khachkars and tombstones that also date back to the 10th –11th centuries.

In 1978 restoration efforts began at the monastery and in 1990 they ended before their completion.

== Gallery ==
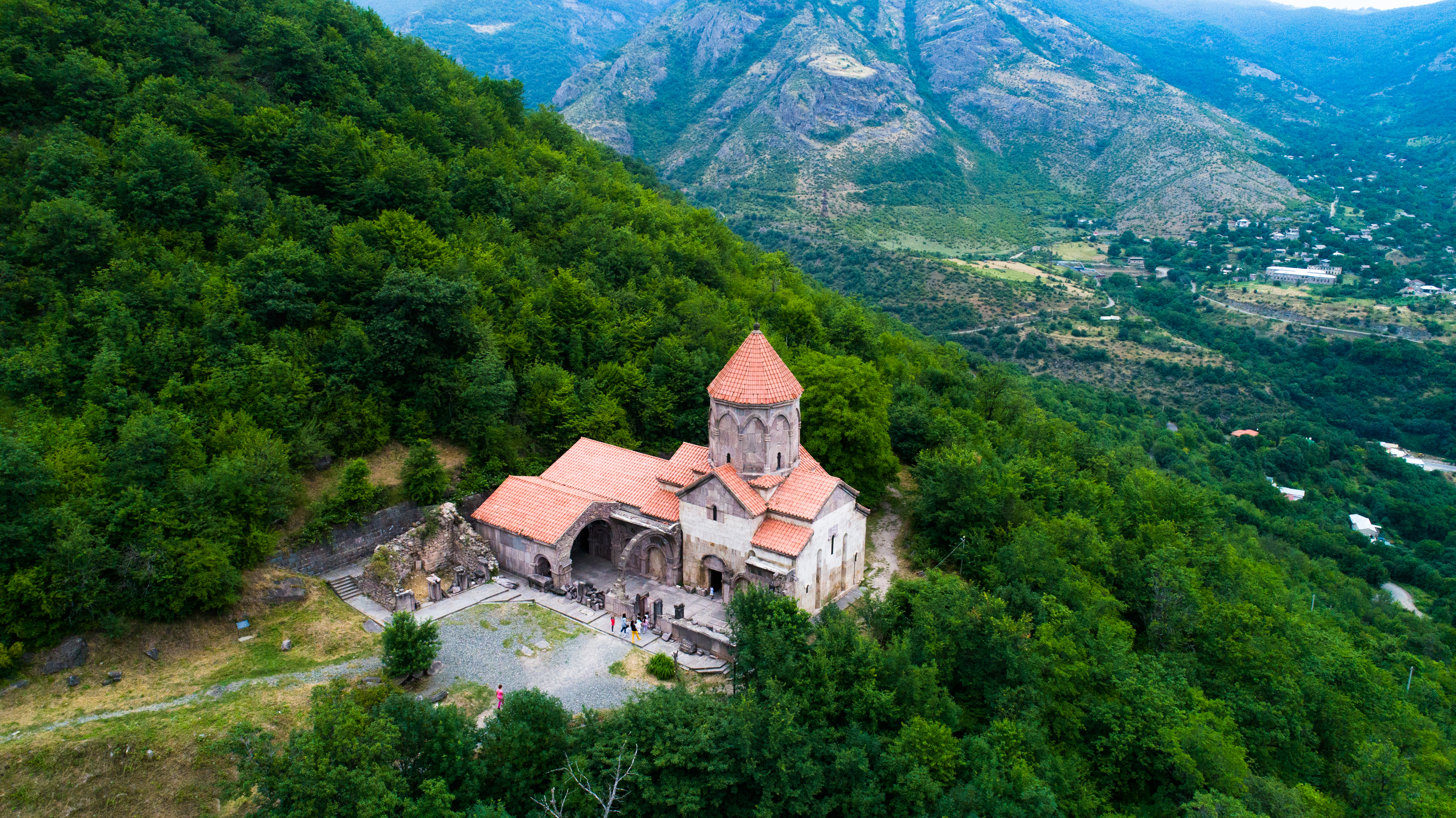

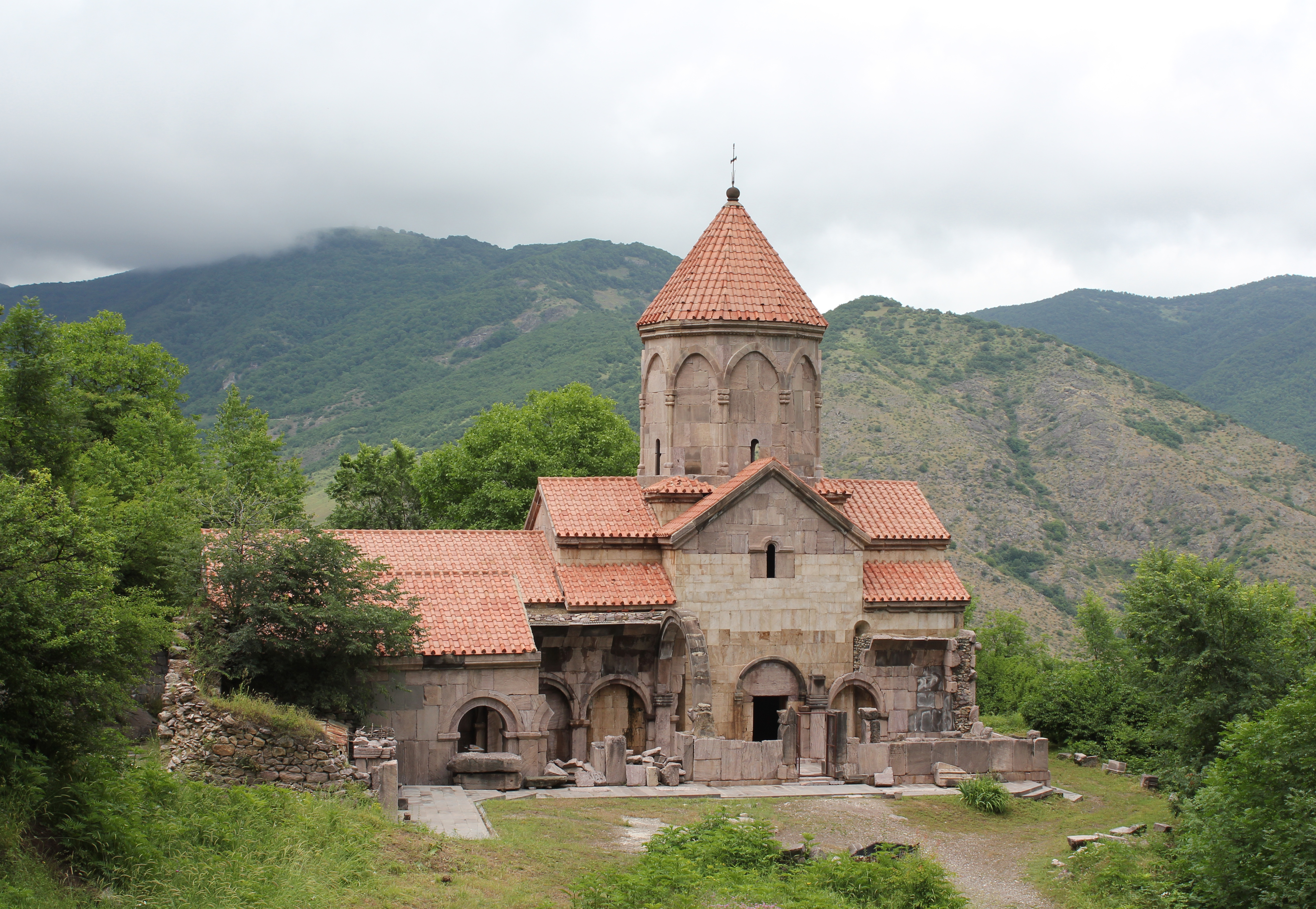

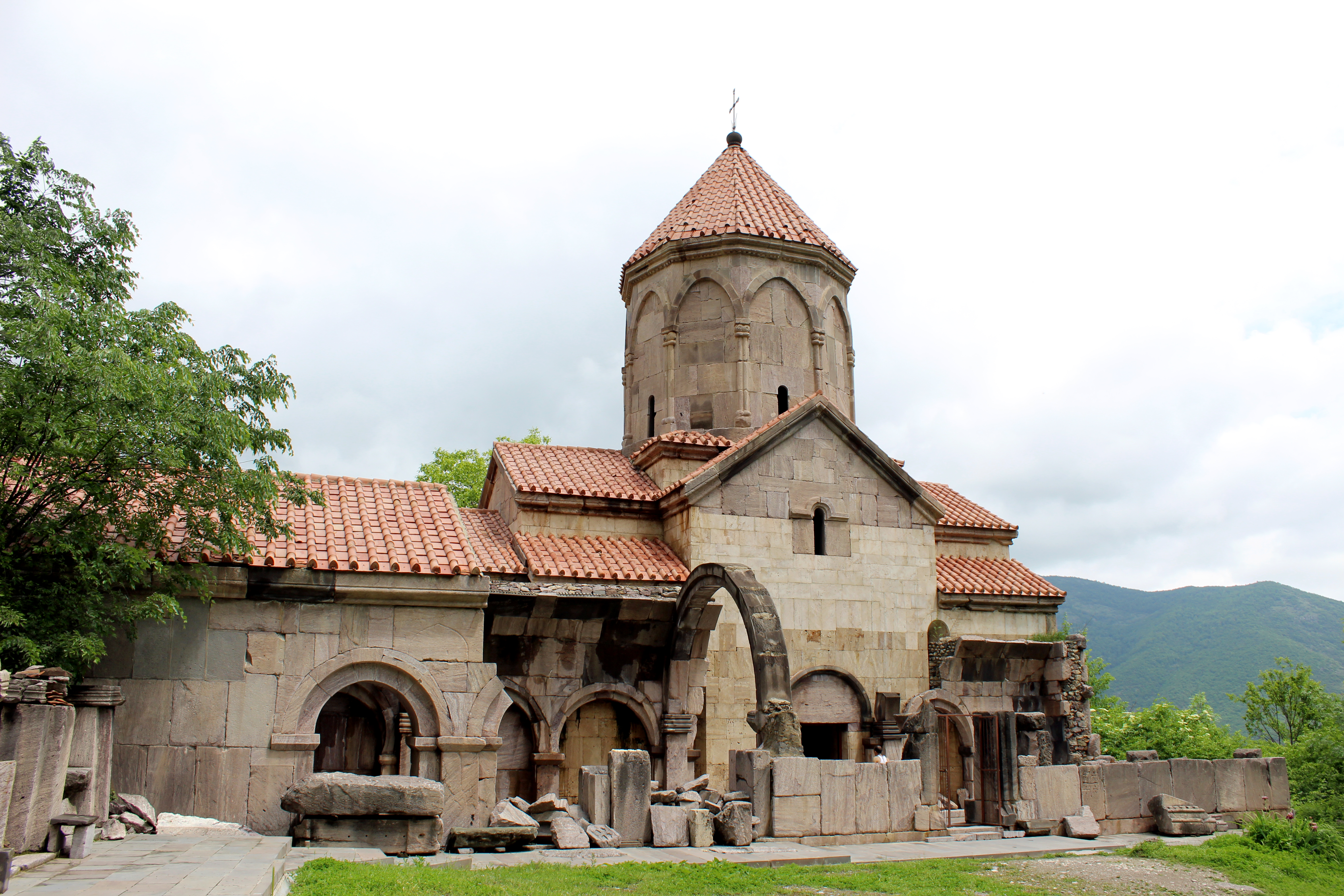

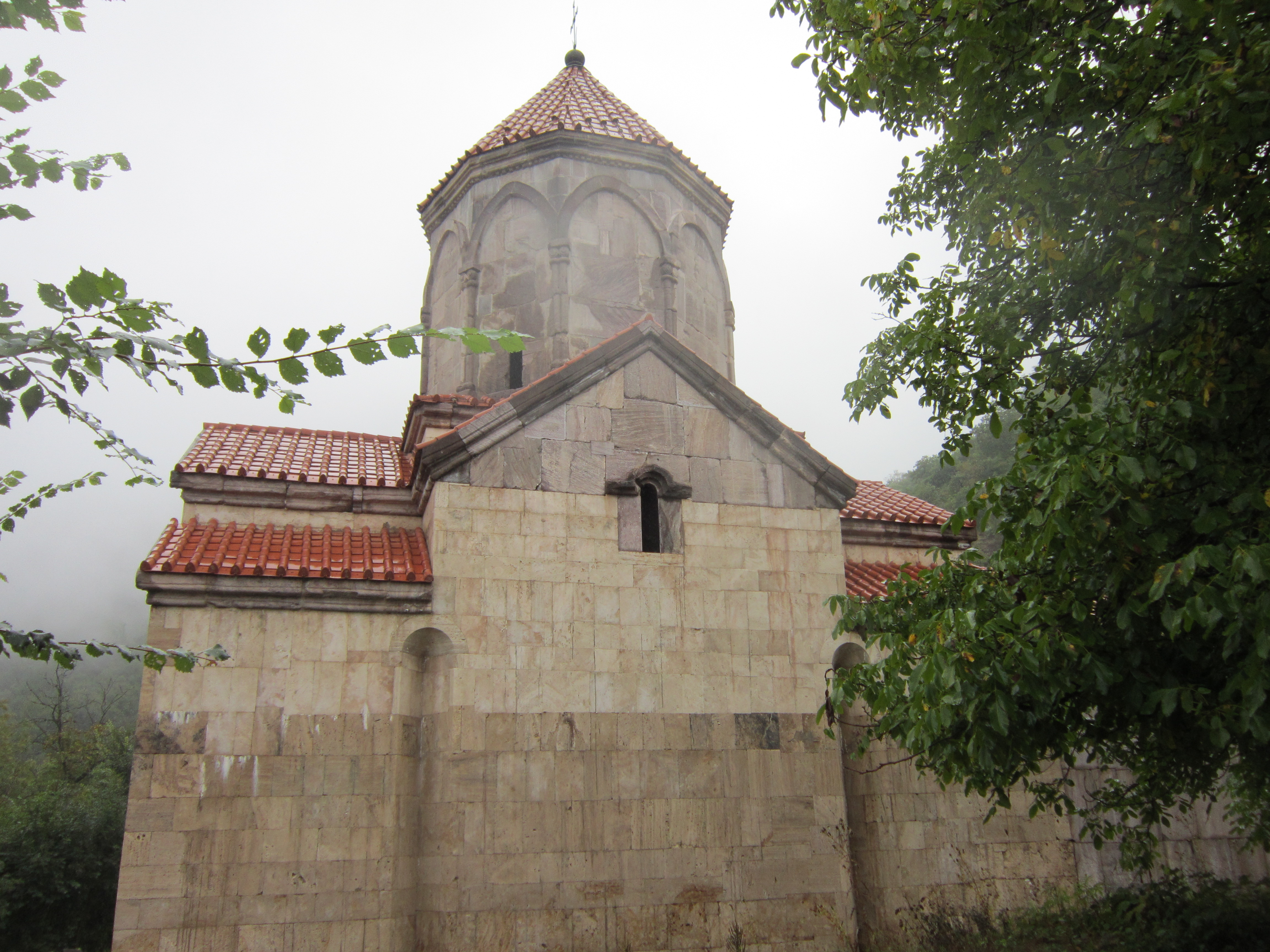

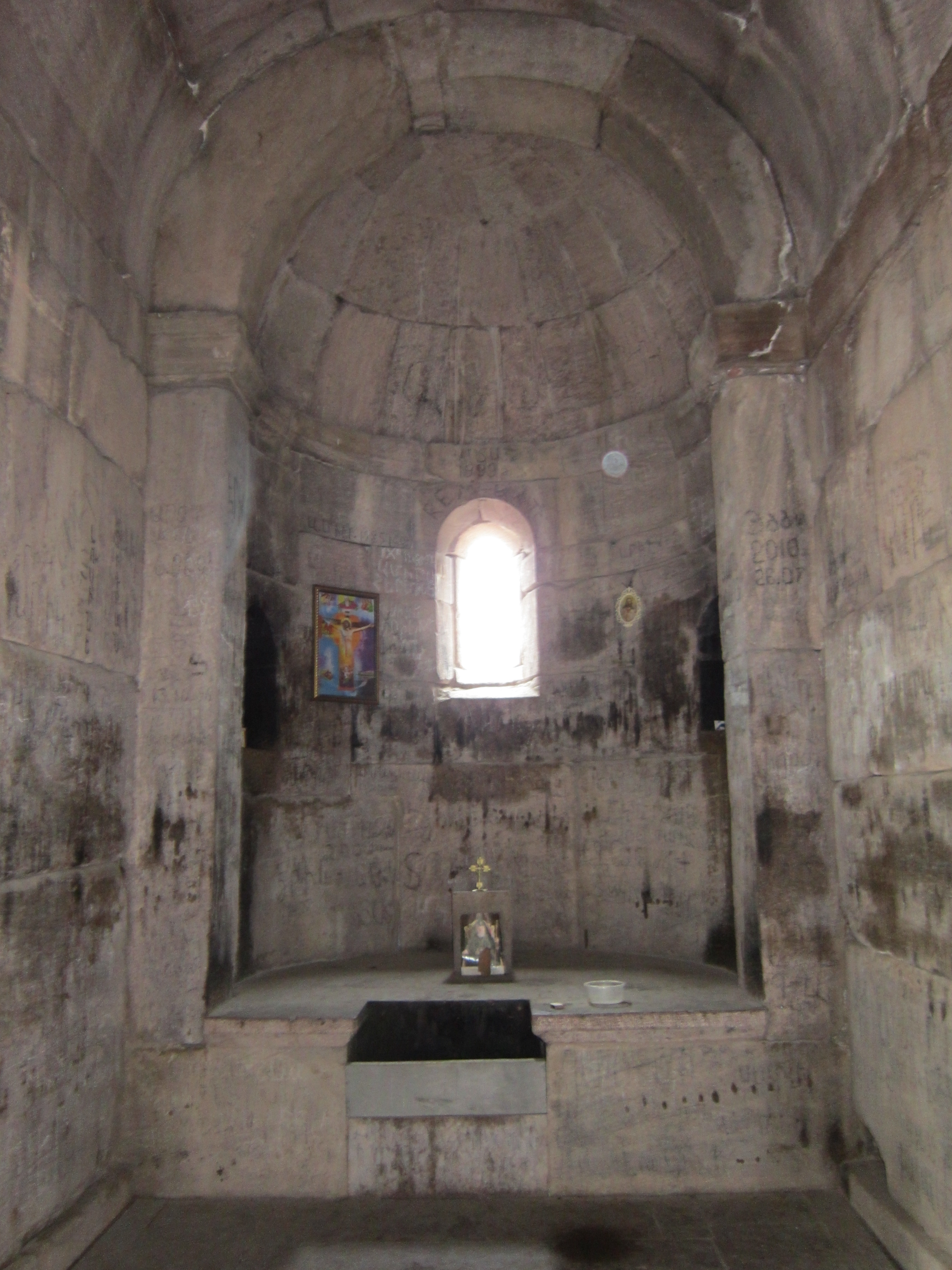

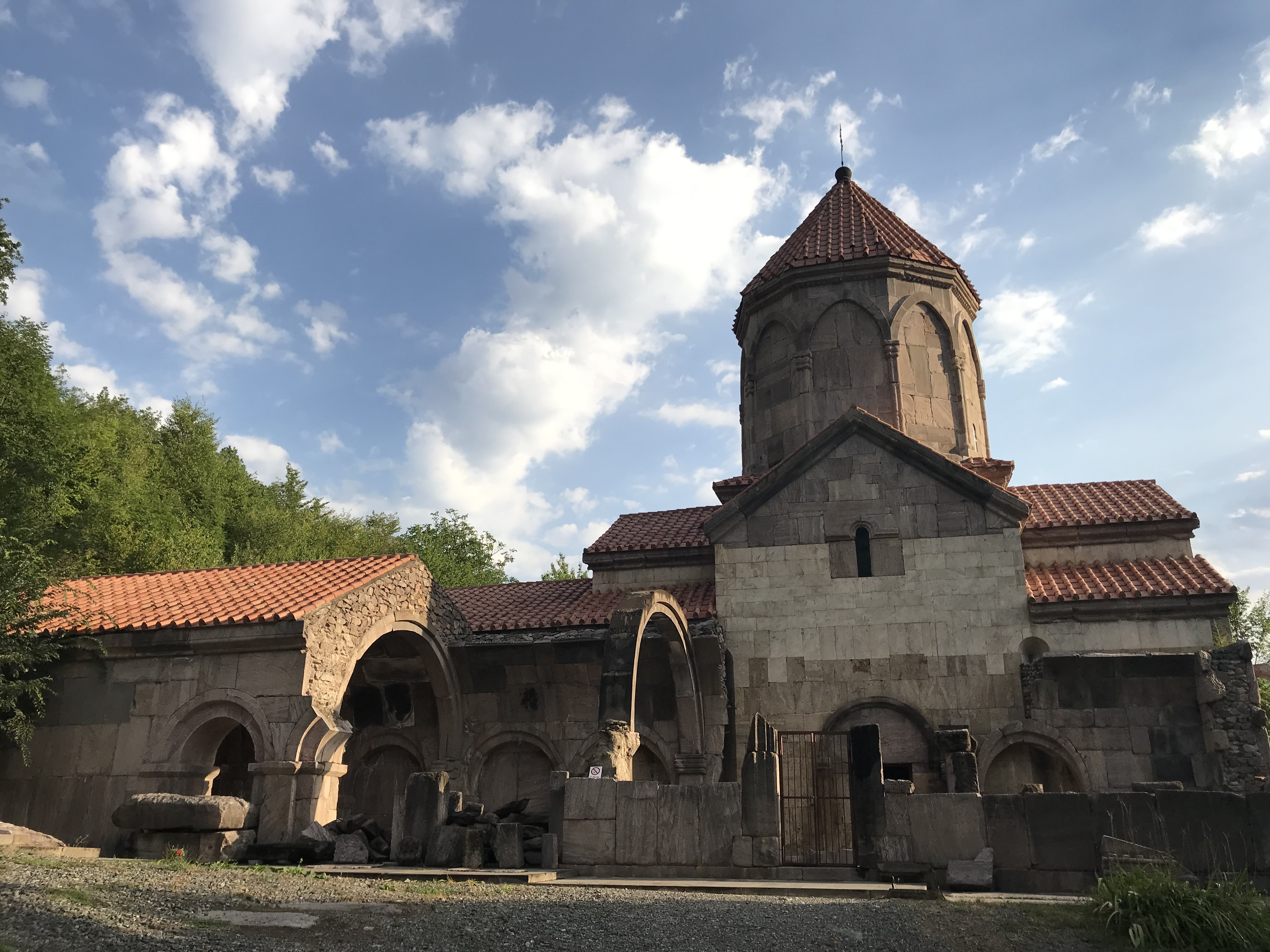

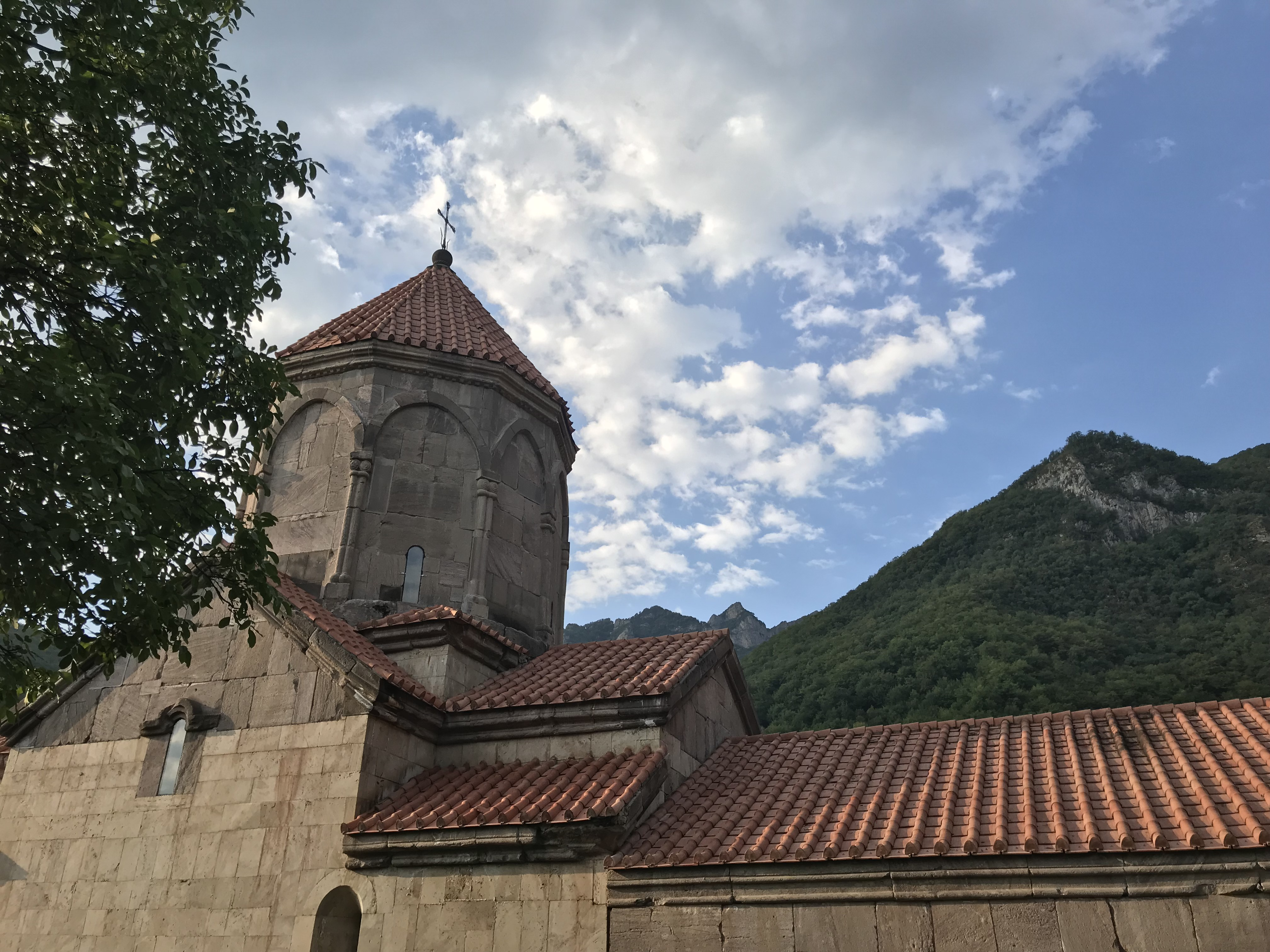

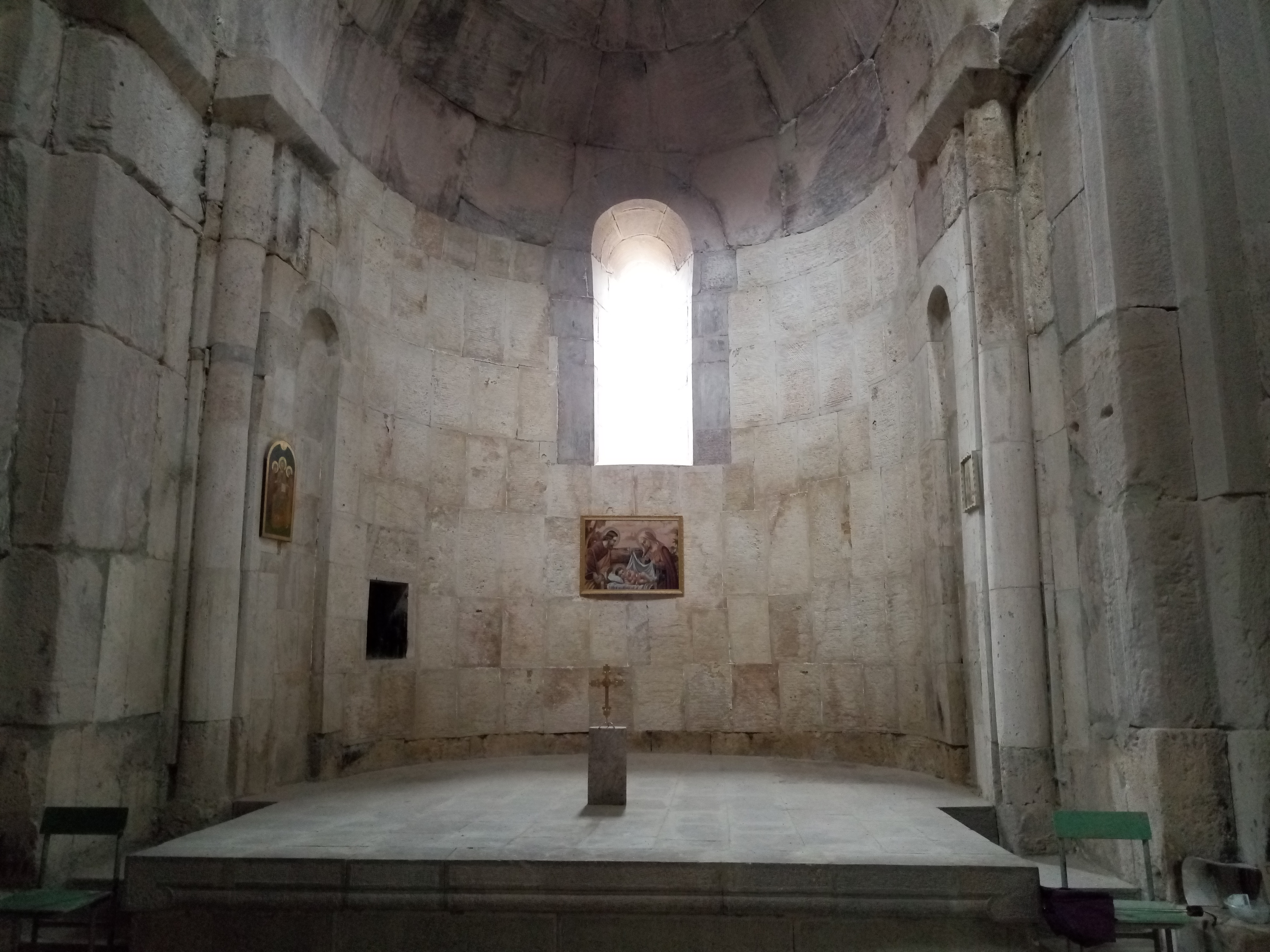

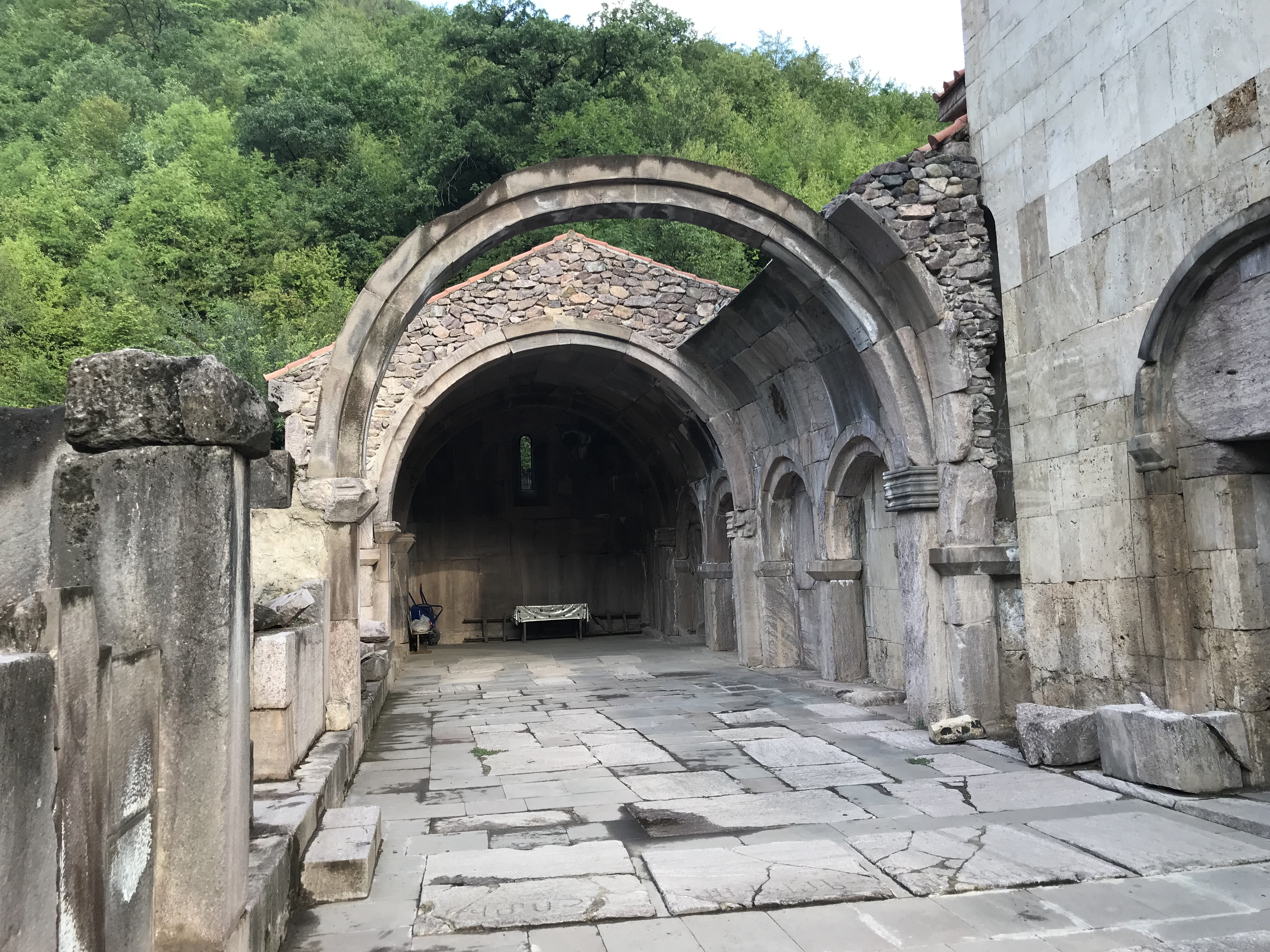

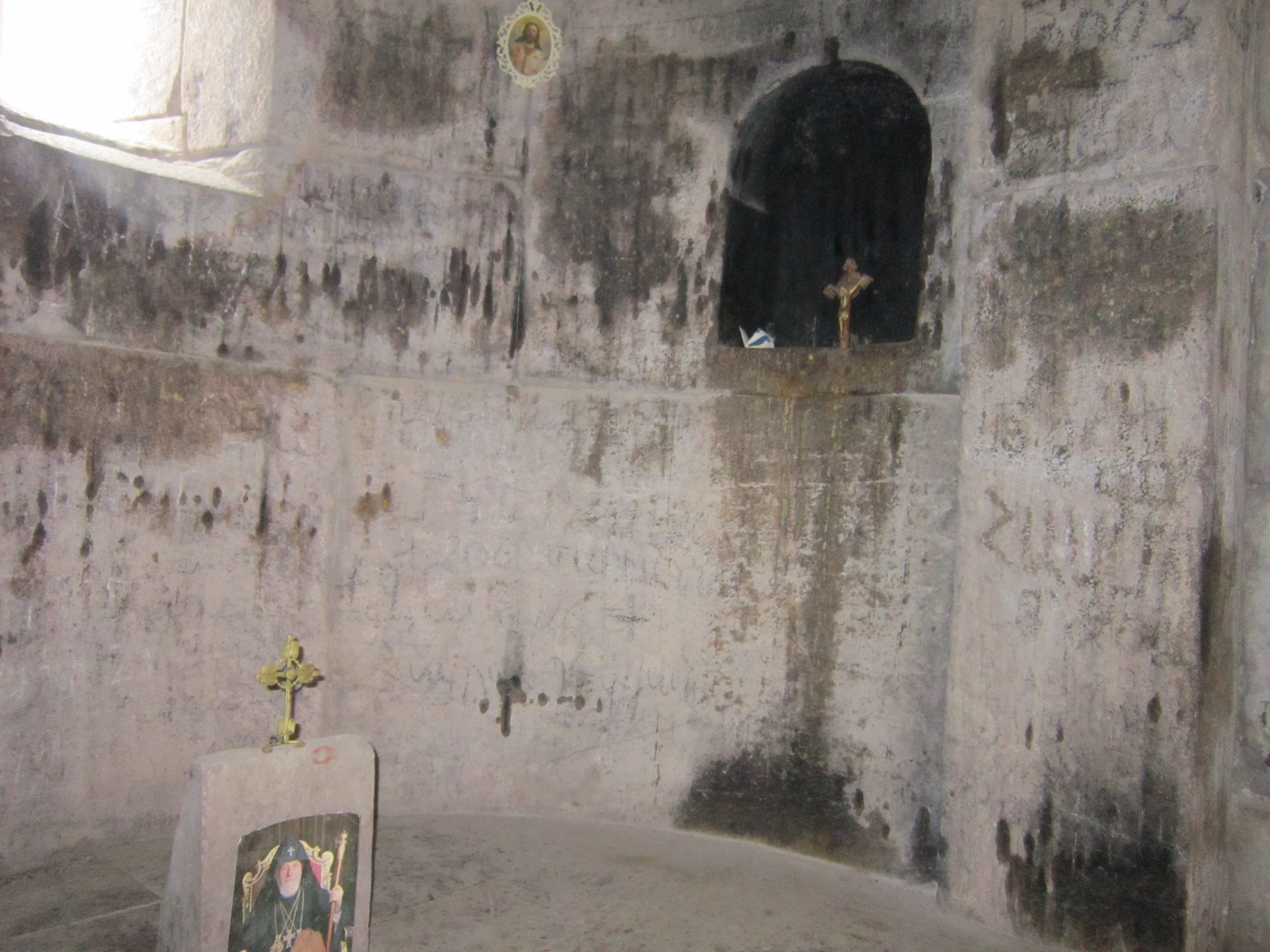

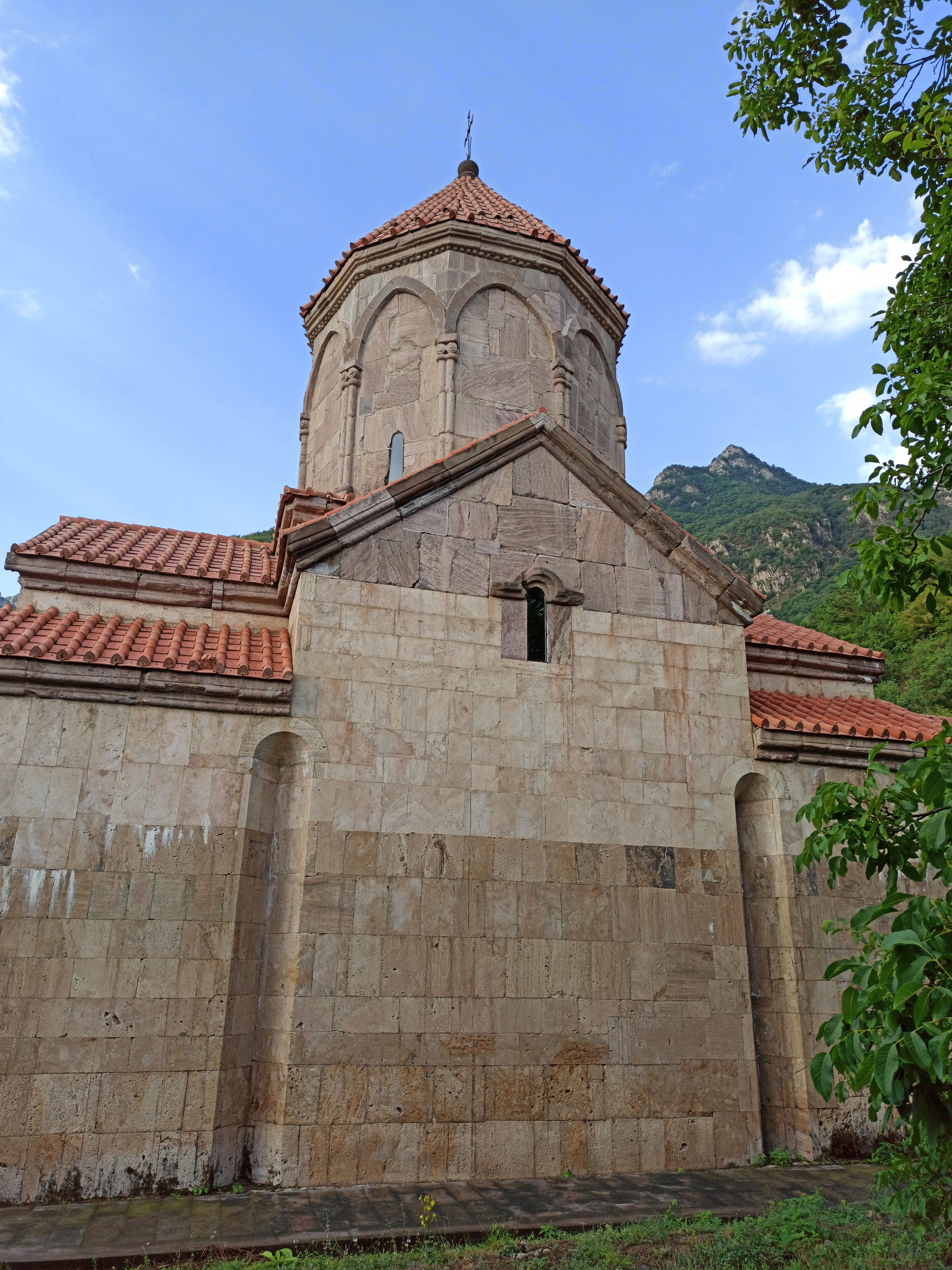

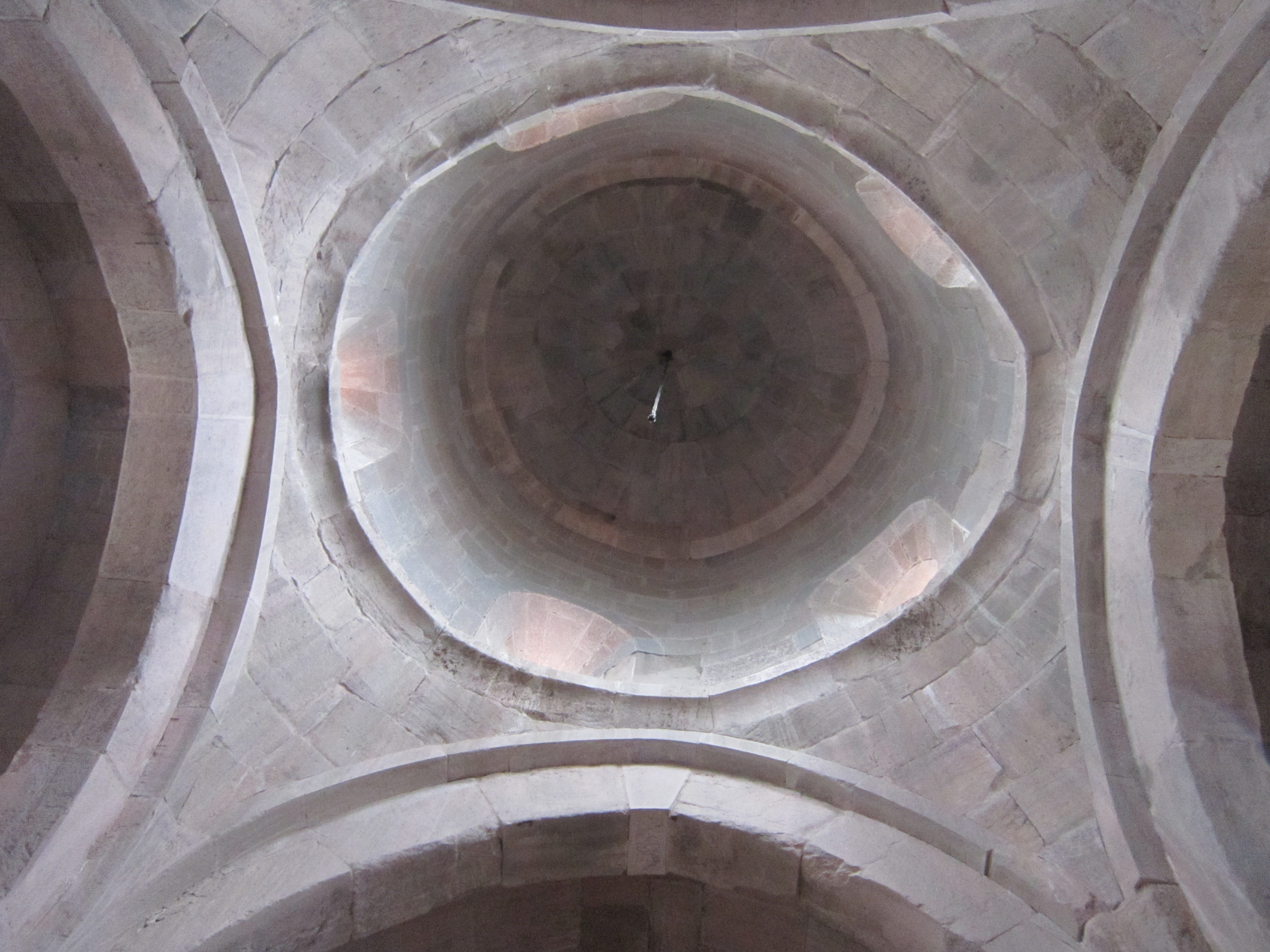

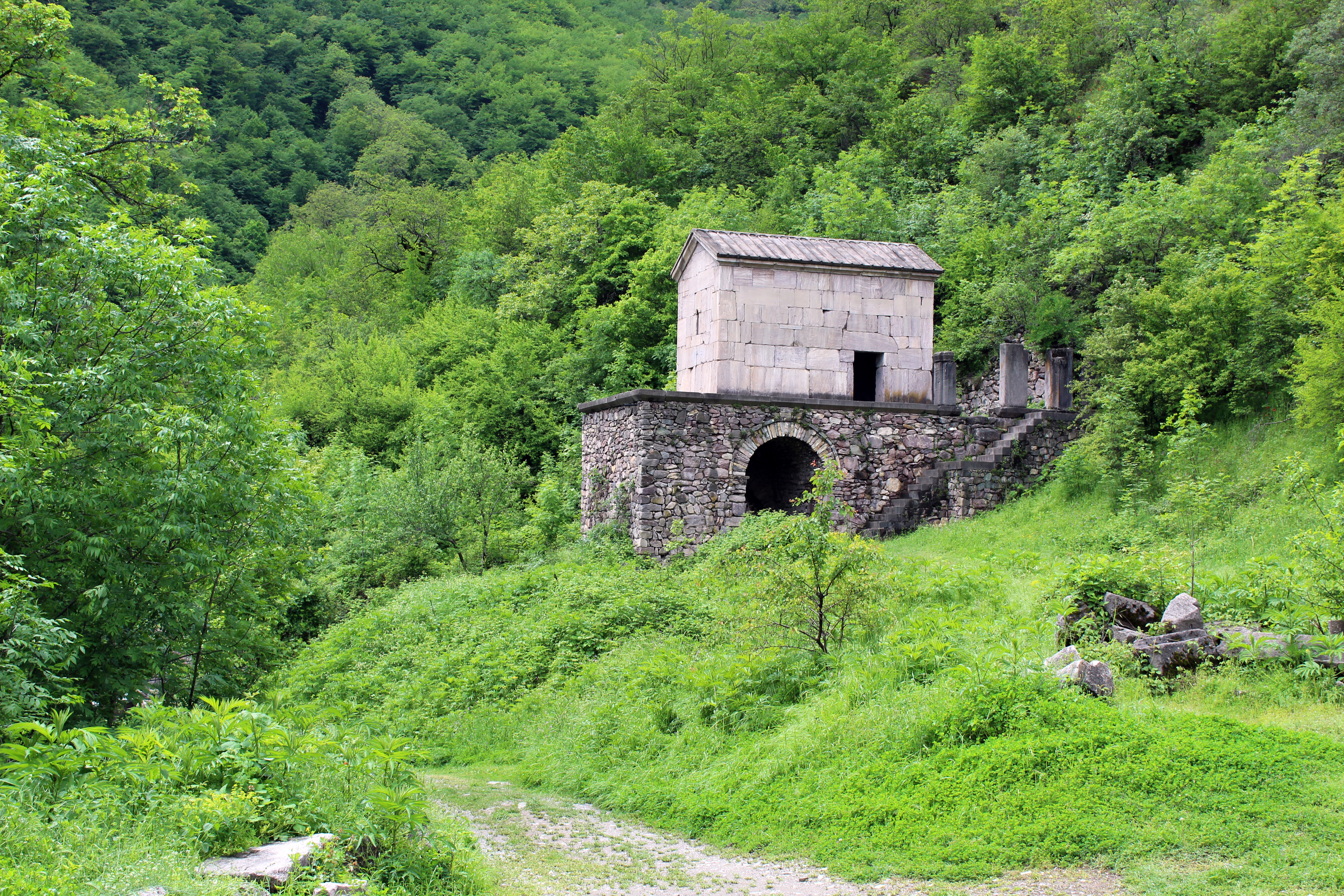

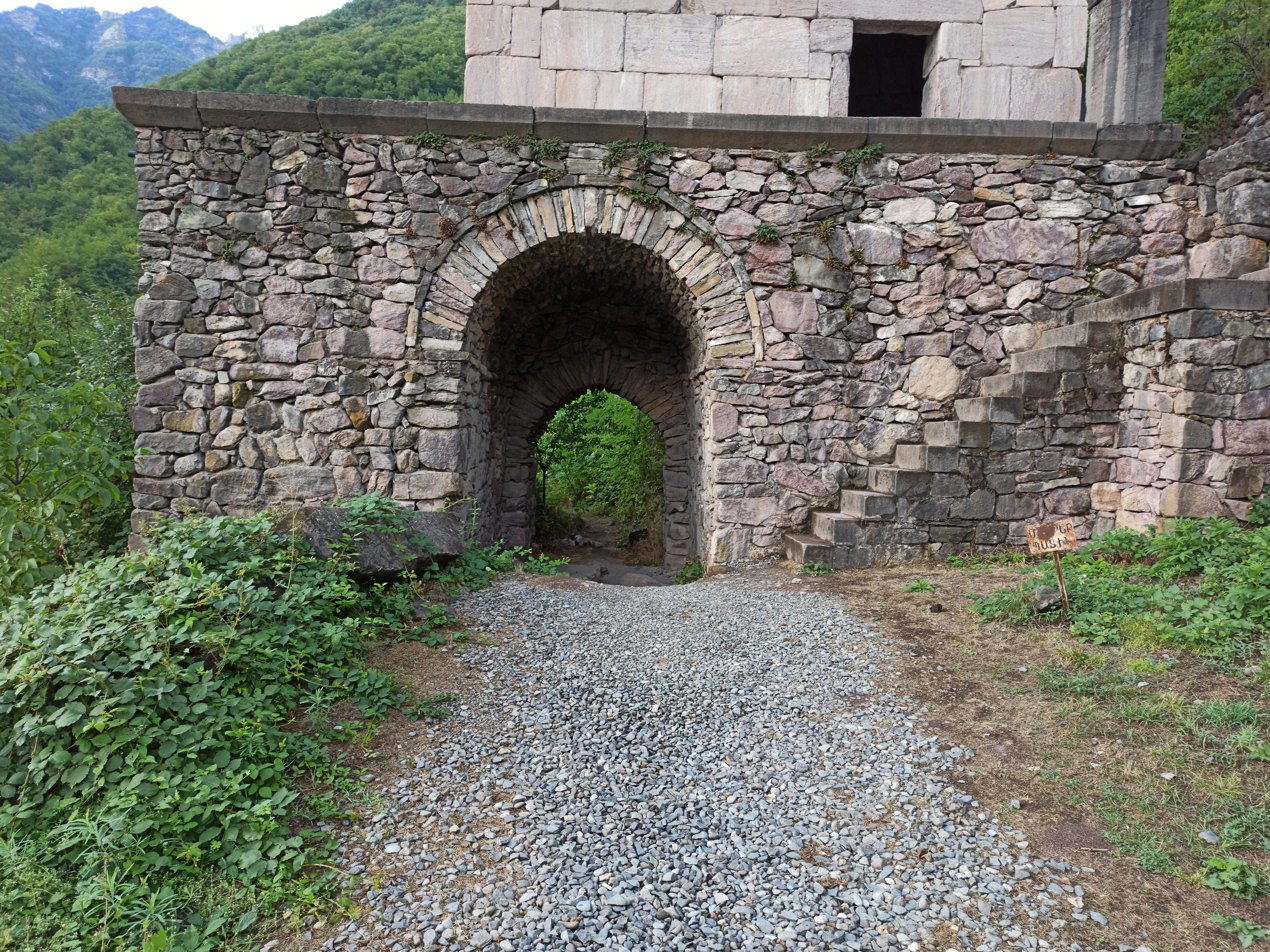

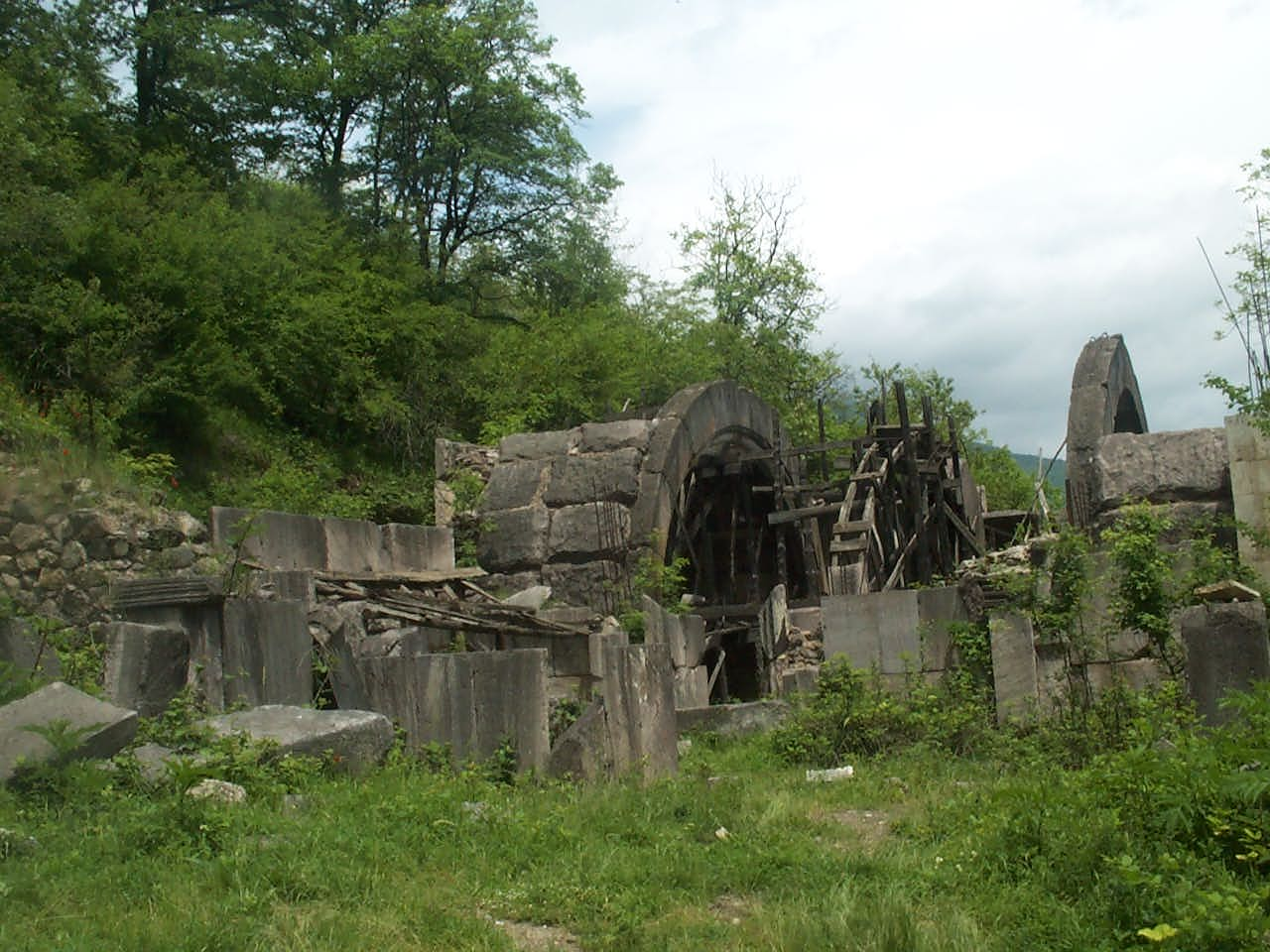

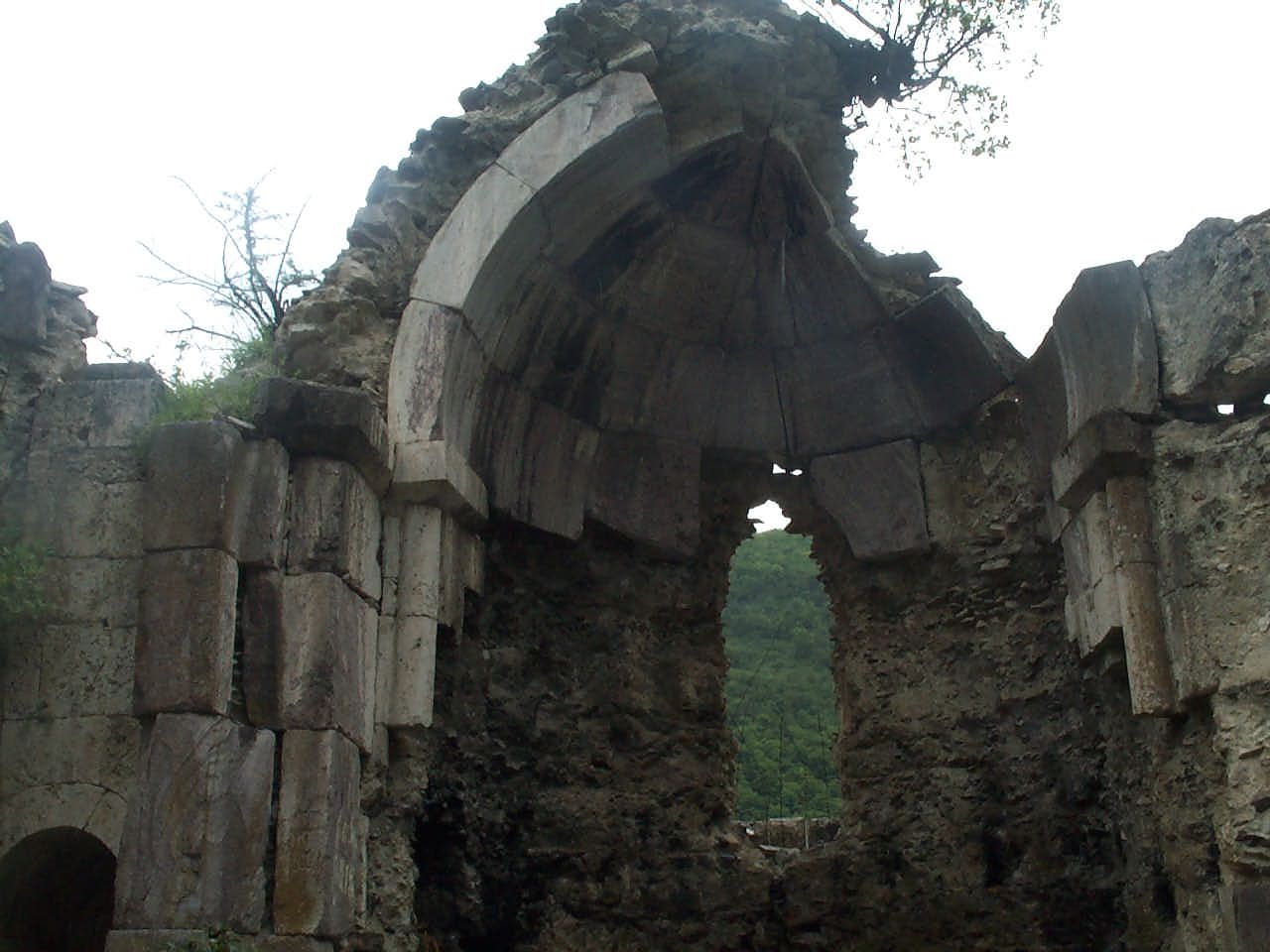

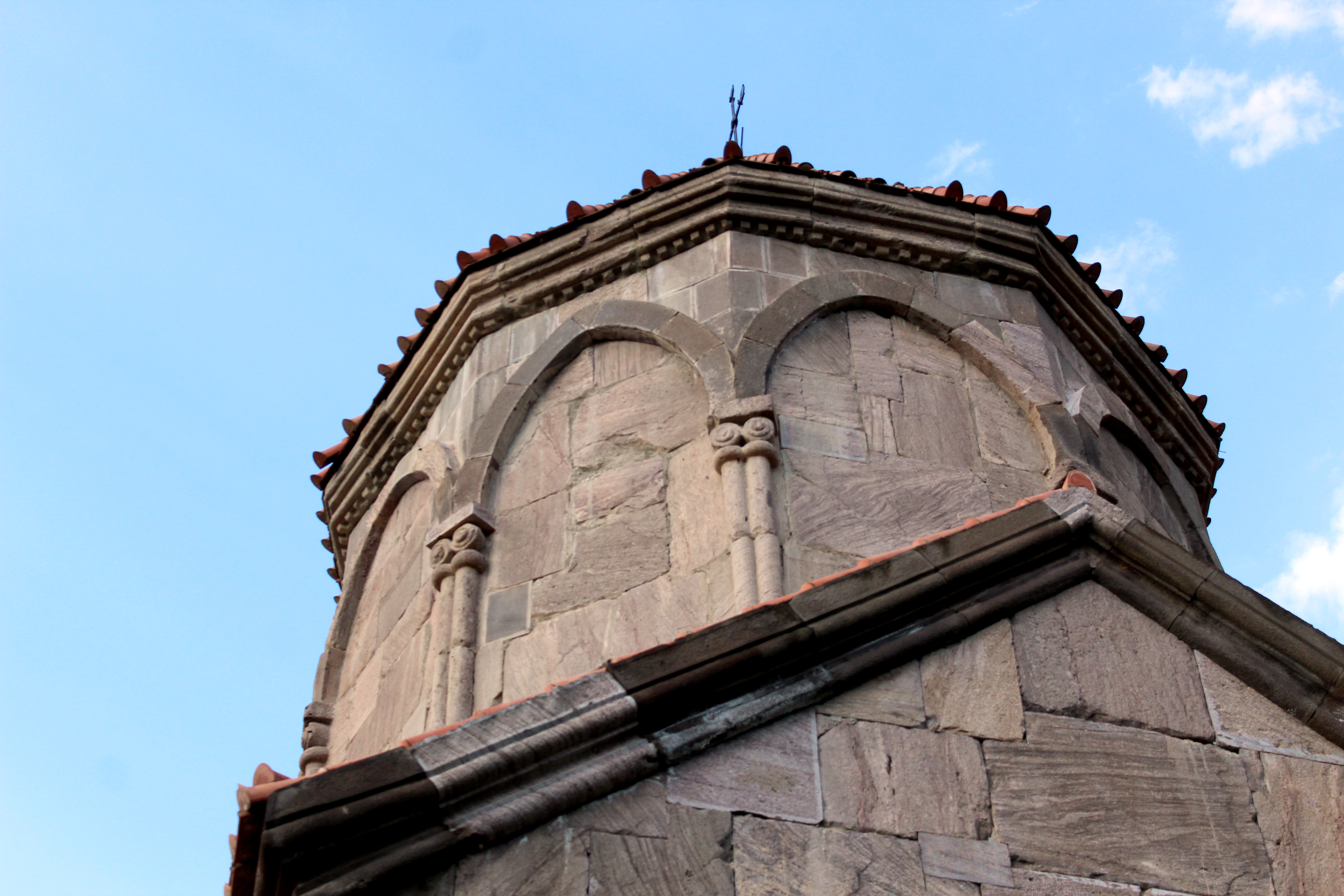

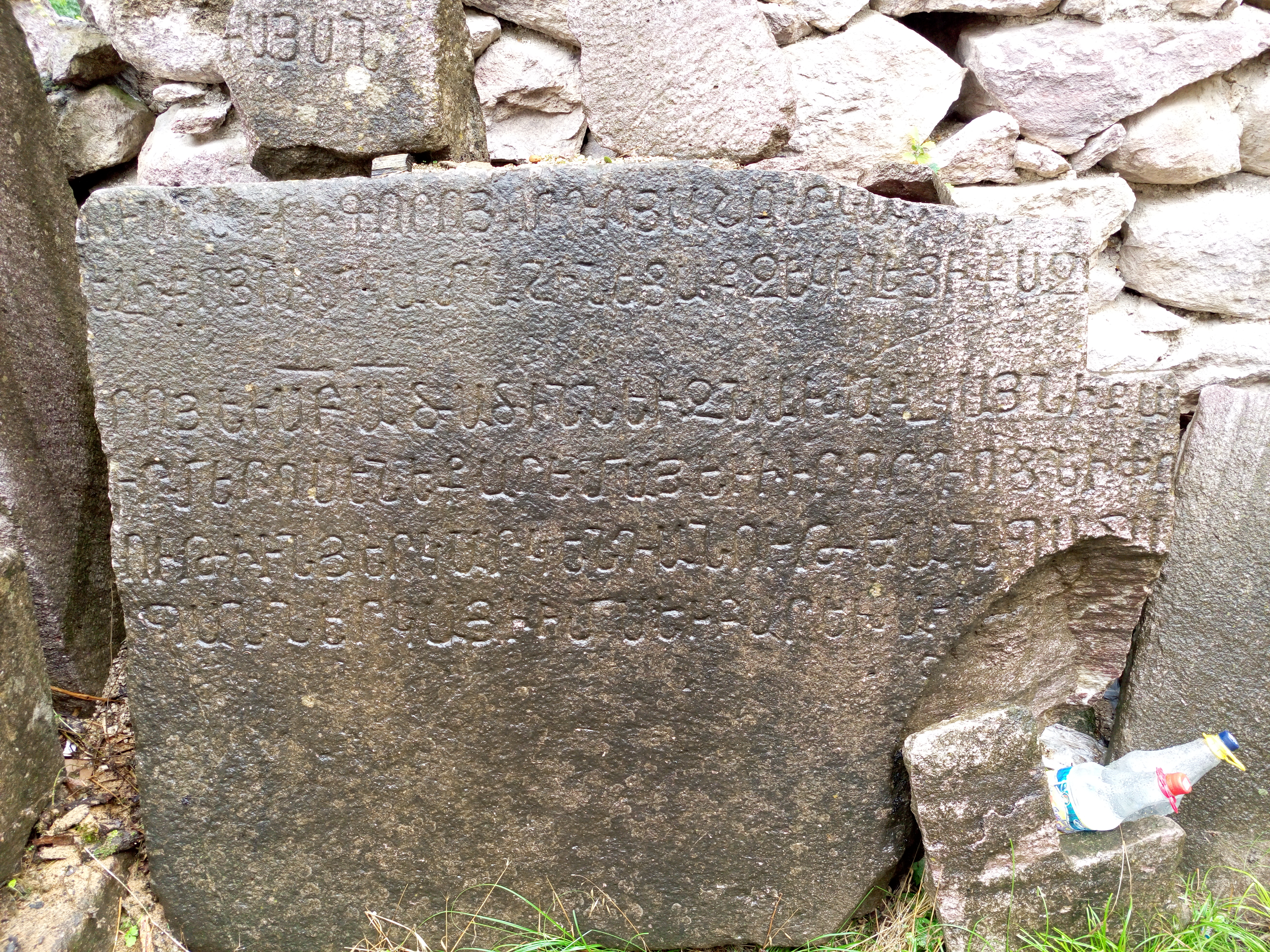

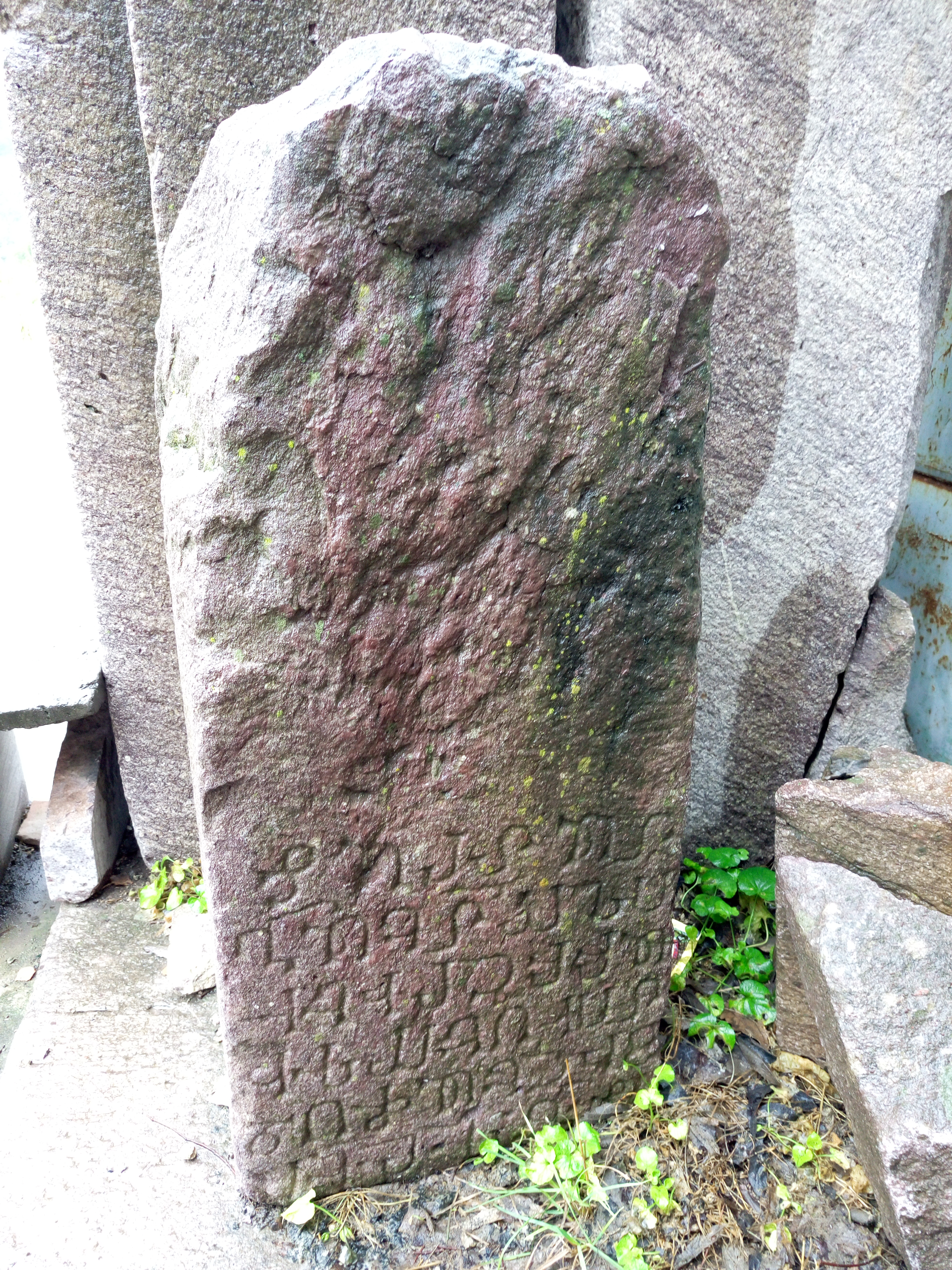

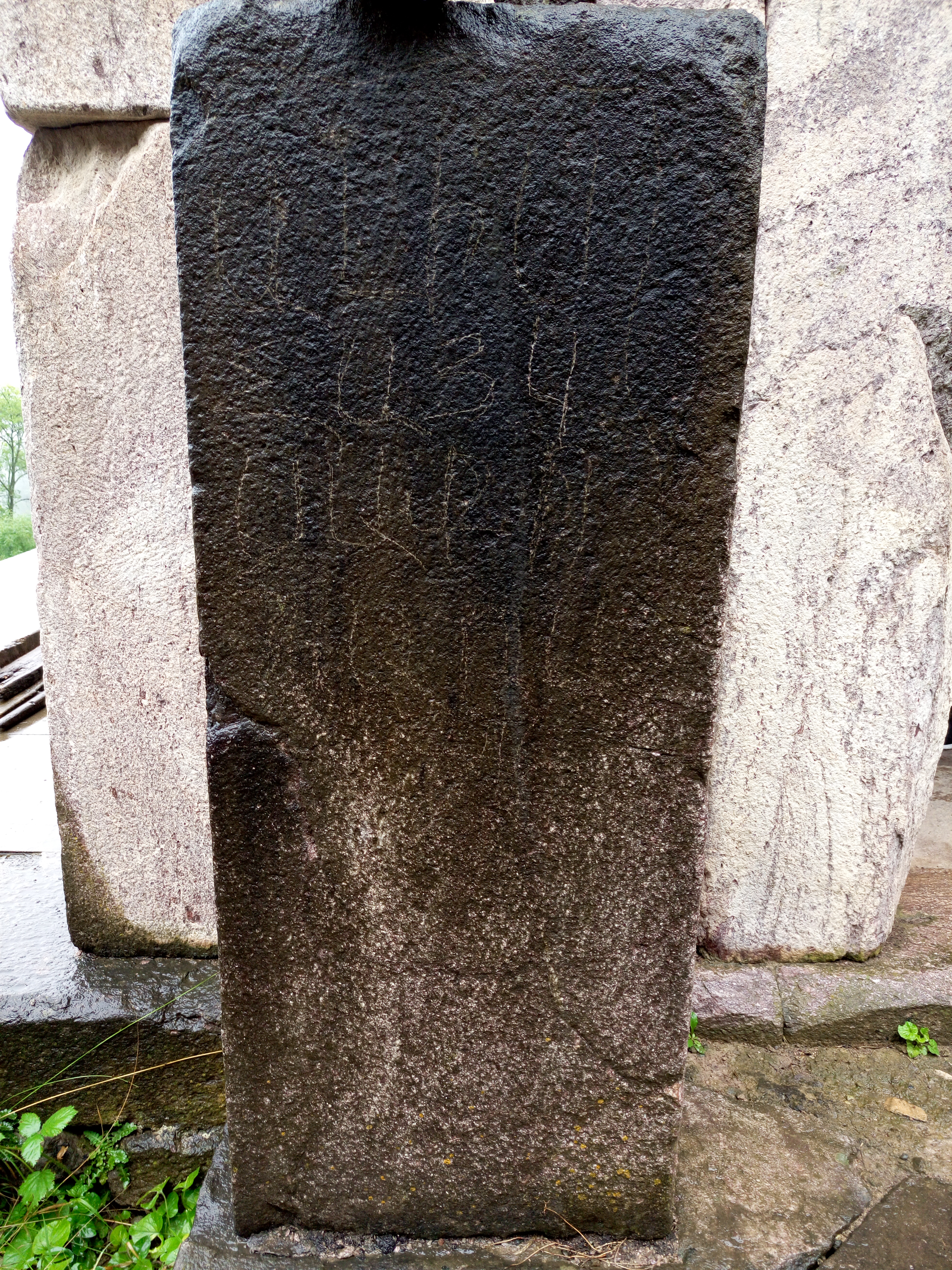

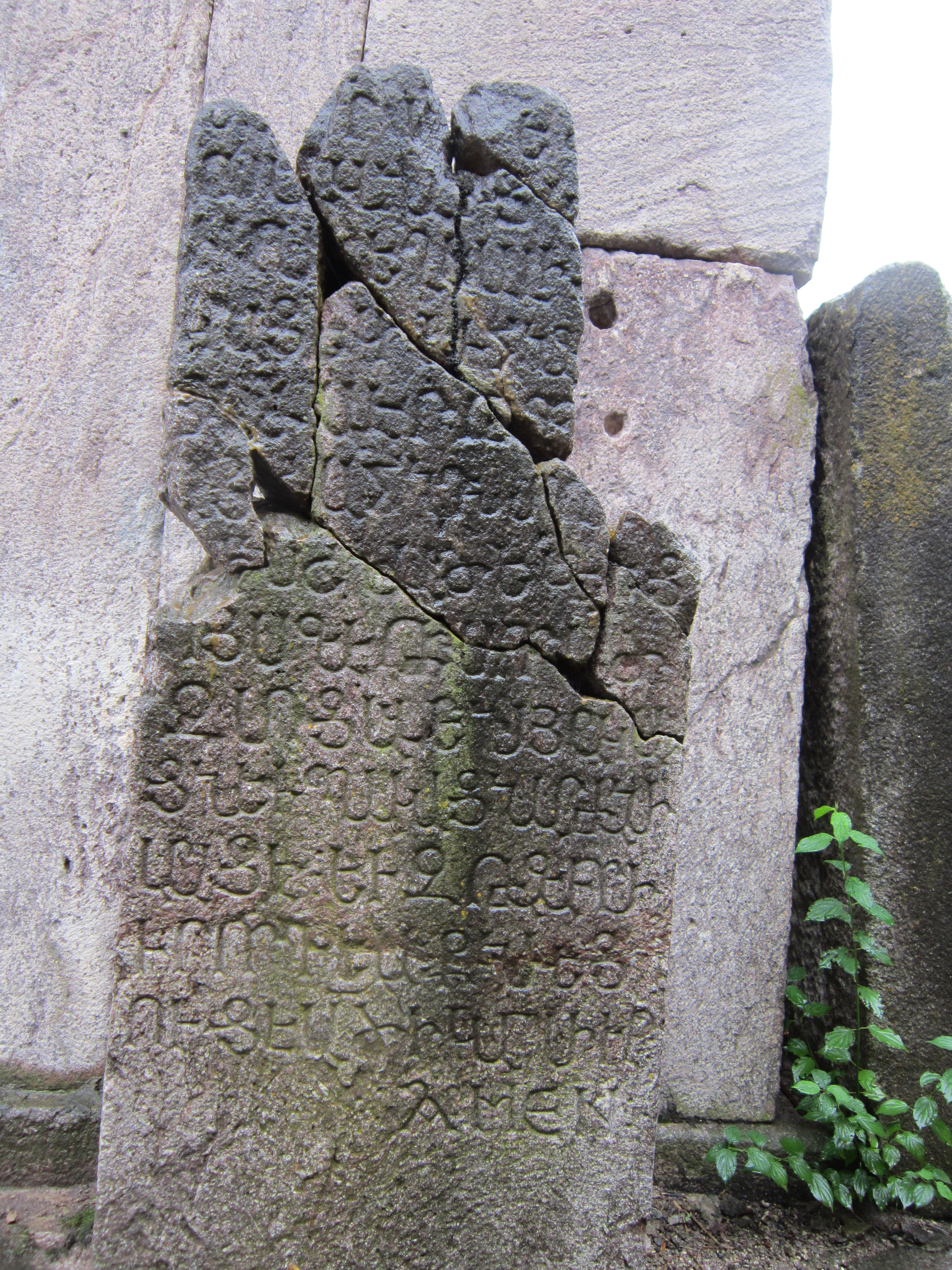

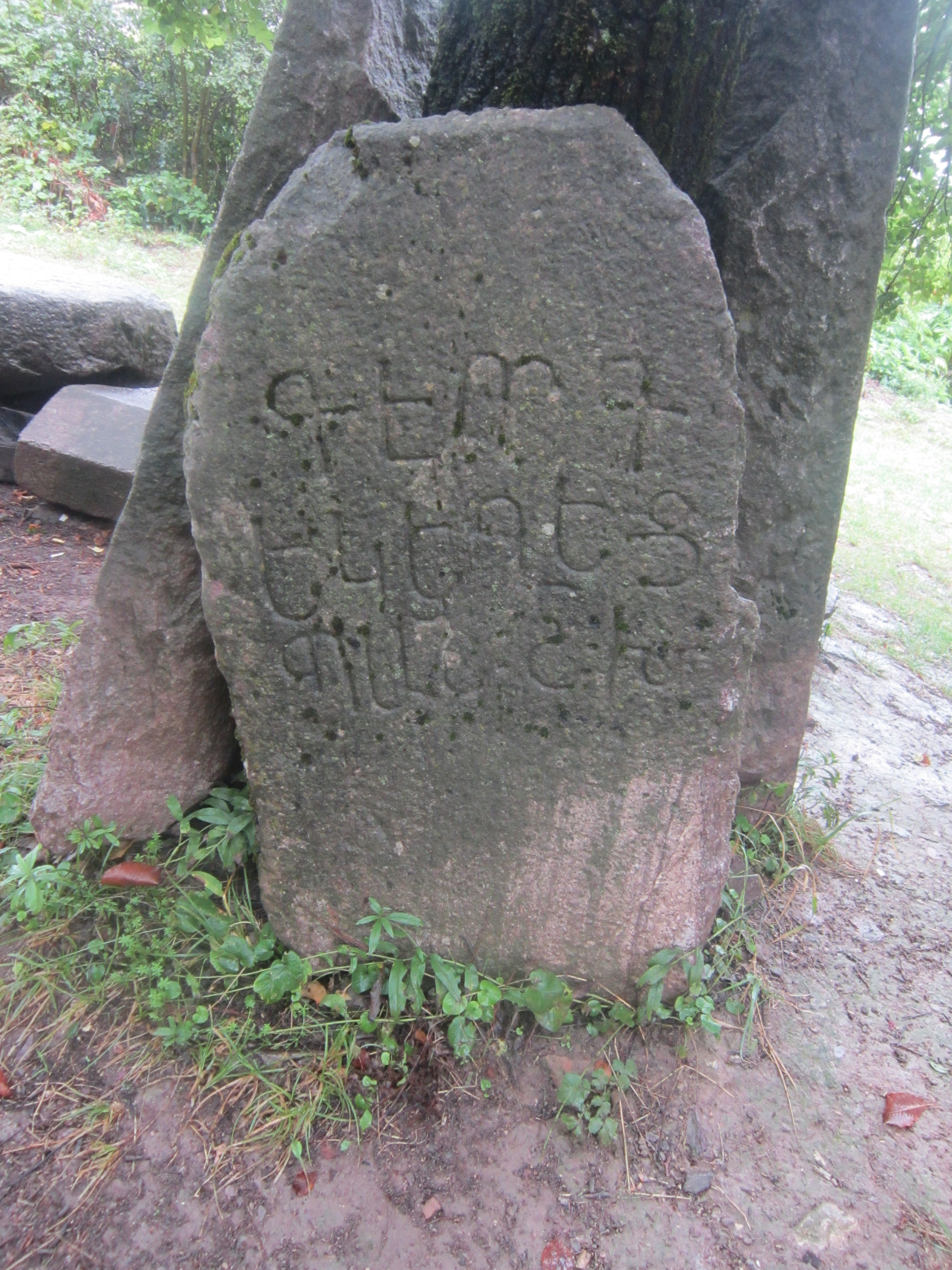

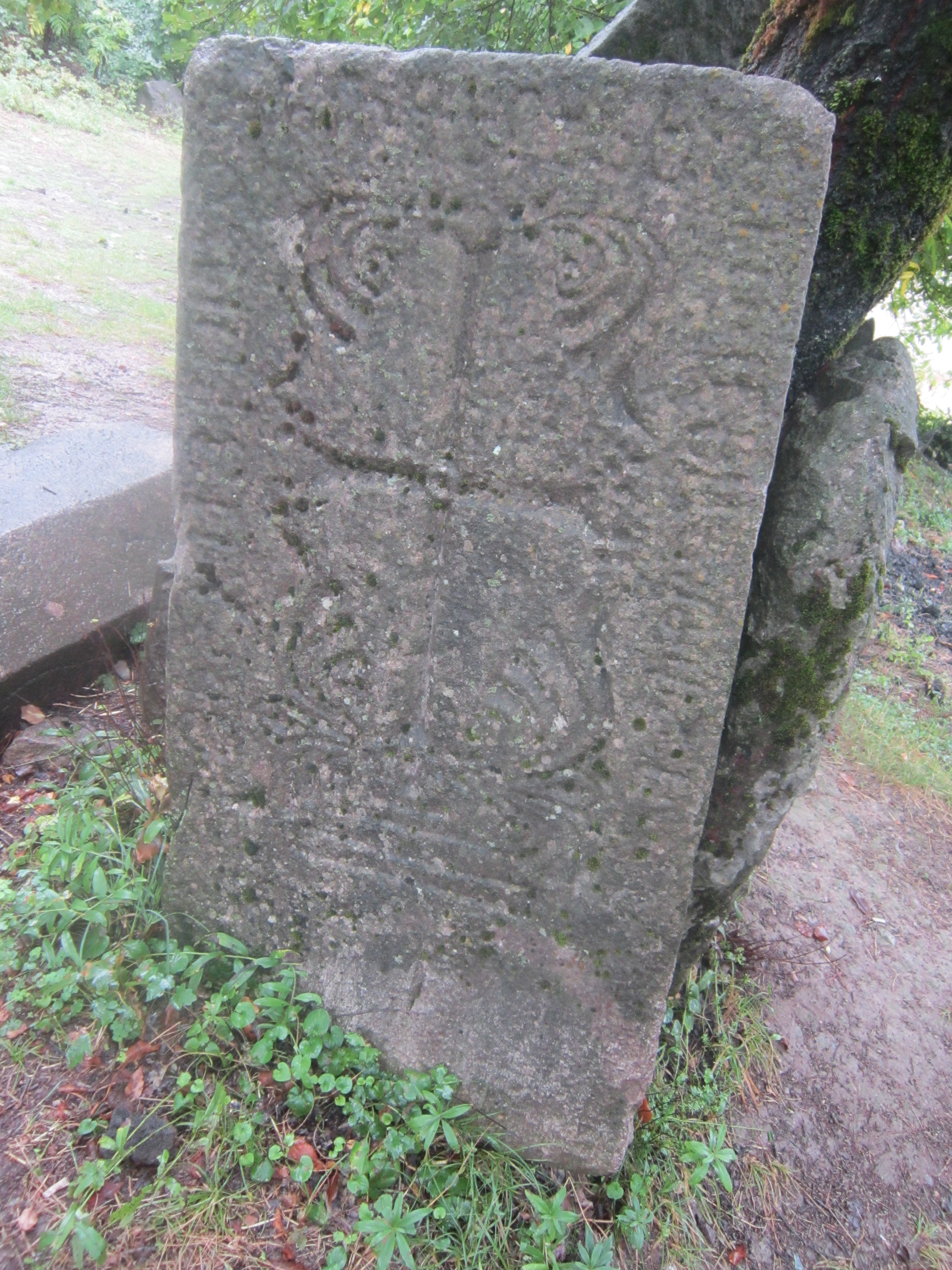
