= Kingdom of Hereti =

Early medieval Georgian kingdom

Kingdom of Hereti ჰერეთის სამეფო
- 893–1020s
- situation in the Caucasus in 850s (Hereti's greatest extent)
- Status: Kingdom
- Capital: Shaki; 41°11′31″N 47°10′14″E
- Official languages: Georgian
- Common languages: Georgian; Caucasian Albanian
- Religion: Georgian Orthodox Church; Oriental Orthodox
- King
- Historical era: Early Middle Ages
  - Established: 893
  - Disestablished: 1020s
Preceded by	Succeeded by
Principality of Hereti	Kingdom of Kakheti-Hereti
- Today part of: Countries today: Georgia; Azerbaijan; Russia

The Kingdom of Hereti (Georgian: ჰერეთის სამეფო, romanized: heretis samepo) was a medieval Georgian monarchy which emerged in Caucasus on the Iberian-Albanian frontier. Nowadays it roughly corresponds to the southeastern corner of Georgia's Kakheti region and a portion of Azerbaijan's northwestern districts.

According to traditional accounts, the name of the province originated from the legendary patriarch "Heros", the son of Thargamos, who founded the city of Hereti (later known as Khoranta) at the Alazani River.

== Background ==
From the earliest times, Hereti came under the rule of the Caucasian Albania. With the decline of Caucasian Albania, the area was gradually incorporated into the Iberian kingdom forming one of its duchies (saeristavo) in the 5th century and its peoples were eventually assimilated into the Georgians proper. It was when the name Hereti first appeared in the Georgian sources. Hereti was populated by Caucasian Albanians, Dagestani, Armenians, Persians and Georgians. It had flourishing towns that traded with Persia and Armenia.

As a reward for the contribution in the struggle against the Arab occupation, the Iberian ruler (erismtavari) Archil gave Hereti to the noble family of Bagrationi in the 740s–750s. After the death of the last Iberian princes John and Juansher, the Heretian lords extended their fiefdoms and, in 787, established an independent principality (samtavro) with the capital in Shaki.

== History ==
Its first recorded ruler, Sahl Smbatean, slaughtered the Caucasian Albanian (Mihranids) royal family in 822 and declared himself "Shah of Arran", currying favour with the Caliphate by betraying the Zoroastrian Babak Khorramdin he was recognized as the ruler of Arran. Sahl later incurred Arab distrust, was arrested and sent to Baghdad; he was succeeded by his son Adarnase I and grandson, Grigol Hamam. The principality gained significant strength and prestige by 893, allowing Prince Grigol Hamam to be crowned as the king.

Alarmed by the increasing power of the Heretian kingdom, Kvirike I, the ruler of the neighbouring Kakhetian principality, allied himself with King Constantine III of Abkhazia and, in 915, campaigned against King Adarnase II Patrikios. The allies occupied and divided the country but for a short time as Adarnase Patrikios soon reconquered what had been lost. The kingdom survived Kakhetian attacks but lost Caucasian Albania to its Sallarid (Iranian Azerbaijan) neighbour. Adarnase married Queen Dinar, a daughter of Adarnase III of Tao, with whom he had a son Ishkhanik.

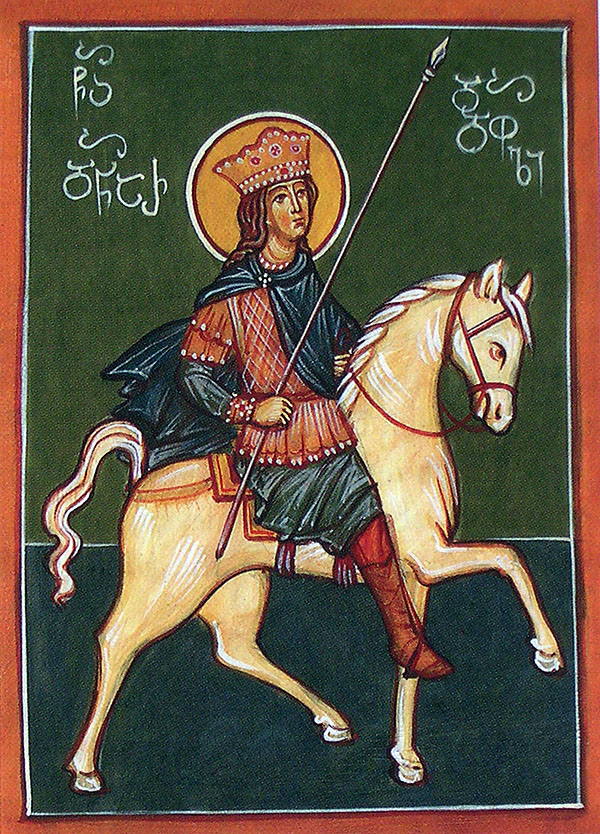
Queen regnant Dinar.

Ishkhanik was the son and successor of Adarnase Patrikios. Under Ishkhanik, Hereti was forced to recognize the supremacy of the stronger neighbour, Principality of Daylam, ruled by the Salarid dynasty. According to The Georgian Chronicles, Queen Dinar, during the reign of her son Ishkhani, converted Hereti to the Eastern Orthodox confession and abandoned the Oriental Orthodox confession in the 10th century. In 950, Ishkhanik took advantage of the bitter power struggle in the Sallarid state, and ceased to pay tribute effectively restoring his independence.

The next Heretian ruler, John (Ioane Senekerim, 951–959), during his reign kingdom of Hereti reached a climax of power and prestige, mainly after the annexation of the right bank of Caucasian Albania. Armenian historian Movses Kaghankatvatsi calls him "restorer of the Kingdom of Albania". Later he annexed parts of Kakheti and adopted the title of "King of the Tsanars". John had good relations towards the representatives of the Sallaried Dynasty and with David III Kuropalates of Tao. Like his father and his grandmother Queen Dinar, he contributed a lot to the conversion of his kingdom. He died in 959 without an heir.

The area then was contested between the ruler of Kakheti, David (c. 976–1010), and the Georgian king Bagrat III who sought to bring all Georgian lands into a single monarchy. The next Kakhetian ruler, already titled as the king, Kvirike III the Great (1010–1037) finally absorbed Hereti into his Kingdom of Kakheti-Hereti in the 1020s. When the Georgian king David the Builder brought the kingdom under his control in 1104, Hereti became a saeristavo (i.e. a duchy) within the Georgian realm. Georgian rule of Hereti was interrupted by Atabegs of Azerbaijan, Khwarezmid Empire and Ilkhanid rule. After the final disintegration of the unified Georgian monarchy in 1466, Hereti came under the Kakhetian crown. Afterwards, the name of the province itself has gradually disappeared from the historic records and public usage due to successively Kara Koyunlu, Aq Qoyunlu, Safavid, Afsharid, and Ottoman rules.

== Rulers of Hereti ==
Ruler	Reign	title	Notes
1. Sahl Eṙanshahik	815–840	Prince	
2. Adarnase (I)	840–865	Prince	
3. Grigol Hamam	865–897	King	(King since 893)
4. Adarnase (II)	897–943	King	
5. Ishkhanik	943–c. 965	King	
6. John Senekerim	c. 965–995	King	became "King of the Tsanars"
7. Dinar	c. 1010s	Queen	

== See also ==
- Caucasian Albania
- History of Georgia
- Kakheti
- Saingilo

== Literature ==
- Papuashvili, T. Problems of Heretian history. Tbilisi, 1970. (in Georgian)
- Papuashvili, T. Kingdom of the Rans and Kakhs. Tbilisi, 1982. (in Georgian)
