= John of Hereti =

John Senekerim იოანე სენექერიმი

King of Hereti
- Reign: c. 965–995
- Predecessor: Ishkhanik
- Successor: Dinar
- Dynasty: Arranshahik
- Religion: Eastern Orthodox Church

John Senekerim (Georgian: იოანე სენექერიმი) was the ruler of the Kingdom of Hereti. John is the only known child of King Ishkhanik. During his reign Hereti reached an apex of power and prestige, mainly after the annexation of the right bank of Caucasian Albania. Armenian historian Movses Kaghankatvatsi calls him the "restorer of the Kingdom of Albania". Later he annexed parts of Kakheti and adopted the title of "King of the Tsanars". John had a good relations with the representatives of the Sallarid dynasty (Daylam) and with David III Kuropalates of Tao. Like his father Ishkhanik and grandmother Dinar, he contributed a lot to the conversion of his kingdom. He died without heirs.

== Sources ==
- Papuashvili T. (1970), Problems of the history of Hereti, Tbilisi
- Papuashvili T., Georgian Soviet Encyclopedia, V, p. 288, Tbilisi, 1980

Preceded by Ishkhanik	King of Hereti c. 965-995	Succeeded by Dinar
