= Grigor Hamam =

Ruler of Hereti (Arran)

- Ruler of Hereti
- Reign: 865–893 (as Prince); 893–897 (as King)
- Predecessor: Artnerseh
- Successor: Adarnase the Patrikios
- Died: 897
- Issue: Apuli; Smbat; Sahak Sevada; Vasak; Adarnase the Patrikios
- Dynasty: Arranshahik
- Father: Artnerseh
- Religion: Monophysitism

Grigor Hamam (Armenian: Գրիգոր-Համամ, Համամ Արևելցի, Համամ Բագրատունի, Georgian: გრიგოლ ჰამამი; died 897) was king of Hereti (Arran) from 893 to 897, and previously prince from 865 to 893. He was one of the descendants of the princely family of the Mihranids (Arranshahiks). Prince Grigor Hamam occupied large part of Arran and even restored the Albanian kingship for a while. According to Armenian historians, he was called "Pious" (Barepasht) for his charitable deeds. Grigor Hamam was also a notable scholar and writer, author of biblical commentaries, grammatical works, and a sharakan.

== Origins and family ==
Grigor Hamam descended from the princely family of the Arranshahiks (Mihranids). He was the son of Artnerseh. Some sources consider him a relative of the Bagratids. Grigor Hamam had five sons:

1. Apuli — was killed by his brother Smbat.
2. Smbat — ruler of the lands around Gandzasar (Lower Khachen).
3. Sahak Sevada — ruler of Gardman and Parisos.
4. Vasak — ruler over Upper Khachen.
5. Adarnase the Patrikios (Atrnerseh) — ruler of Hereti.

== Principality and territories ==
Grigor Hamam's principality encompassed the entire Eastern region, as well as the left-bank Kambechan of the Kura River. He occupied large part of Arran. For a short time, he managed to "restore the abolished kingdom of Aghvank" (Albania). This kingdom, which lasted only a few years, was initially under the suzerainty of the Armenian king of the Bagratuni dynasty.

=== Inscriptions ===
Two inscriptions of Grigor Hamam have been preserved:

1. The inscription in Gegharkunik (881) – on a khachkar, where he calls himself "Grigor Atrnersehyan" (son of Atrnerseh).
2. The inscription near Artsakh's Tigranakert – in the village of Sofulu, with the name "Hamam", without a date.

== Political activity ==
=== Restoration of the Albanian kingdom ===
Grigor Hamam restored the Albanian kingdom in parallel with the restoration of the Armenian kingdom by Ashot I Bagratuni. According to Movses Kaghankatvatsi: "Then the pious Hamam, who also became king of Aghvank, likewise restored the ruined kingdom of the house of Aghvank, just as Ashot Bagratuni restored the Armenian kingdom. At the same time they accomplished this."

=== Relations with the Bagratids ===
Grigor Hamam recognized the suzerainty of the Ani Bagratids and acted as their ally. In 893, he played a major role in the ransom of Catholicos Gevorg II Garnetsi from Arab captivity.

=== Division of inheritance ===
After Grigor Hamam's death (897), his sons became vassals of the Bagratid Armenian Kingdom.

- The eldest son Apuli was killed by his brother Smbat.
- Smbat ruled the lands around Gandzasar (proper Khachen).
- Vasak ruled Upper Khachen.
- Sahak Sevada founded the principality of Parisos.
- Atrnerseh (Adarnase the Patrikios) became ruler of Hereti (Shaki-Kambechan).

== Fratricide ==
According to tradition, Grigor Hamam killed his younger brother, after which he repented and wrote a sharakan. The Sofulu inscription mentions the names of his brothers – Philip and Smbat.

== Literary heritage ==
Grigor Hamam was a notable scholar and writer. Stepanos Taronetsi Asoghik testifies: "And Hamam Areveltsi, who wrote the commentary on the Proverbs, and translated (interpreted) the book of Job, and the blessings that are said at the beginning of the Psalms – one book, and the book "Ambic", and the commentary on grammar."

=== "Questions and Answers" (856–865) ===
Grigor Hamam is credited with the work "Questions and Answers" (Vasn hartsmants ev pataschanits), which is of a religious-dogmatic nature.

=== Commentary on the Book of Proverbs ===
The "Commentary on the Book of Proverbs of Solomon" is Hamam's most famous work. It has been preserved in several manuscripts. The commentary is written concisely, with a verse-by-verse explanation, and has a penitential-moral character.

=== Commentary on Grammar ===
Grigor Hamam wrote a commentary on Dionysius Thrax's "Art of Grammar", which is primarily theological in nature. It has been preserved partially and was published by Nikoghayos Adonts and Hakob Keosyan.

=== Sharakan (Hymn) ===
A penitential sharakan (spiritual hymn) has been preserved in Grigor Hamam's name, beginning with the words "Heavenly Father", the acrostic of which spells the name "HAMAM". This sharakan is unique in that it was the first time in Armenian poetry that a personal theme was addressed – repentance for a specific sin of a specific person.

=== Other works ===
The following works are also attributed to Grigor Hamam:

- "Commentary on Dionysius the Areopagite"
- "Order of the Psalms" (musicological-textological)
- "History of Armenia" (lost)

== Question of national identity ==
In the mid-20th century, Azerbaijani historian Z. Buniyatov attempted to present Grigor Hamam as a Turk. However, this theory has been thoroughly refuted by Armenologists. Grigor Hamam's Armenian origin is confirmed by numerous facts: testimonies of Armenian historians, the Armenian acrostic of the sharakan, and the nickname "Areveltsi" (Eastern), which indicates his connection with the Eastern regions of Armenia.

== See also ==
- Principality of Khachen
- Artsakh
- Arranshahiks
- Sahak Sevada
- Kingdom of Hereti

== Bibliography ==
- Alishan, Gh. (1881). Shirak. Venice.
- Acharian, H. (1946). Dictionary of Armenian Personal Names. Vol. III. Yerevan.
- Bakhchinyan, H. (2021). Armenian Medieval Poetry. Vol. I. Yerevan.
- Barkhudaryan, S. (1971). "The Principalities of Artsakh, Shaki and Parisos in the 9th-10th Centuries". Historical-Philological Journal. No. 1. pp. 56–68.
- Barkhudaryan, S. (1973). Divan of Armenian Epigraphy. Vol. IV. Yerevan.
- Buniyatov, Z. (1965). Azerbaijan in the 7th-9th Centuries. Baku.
- Yegiazaryan, V. (2010). "Hamam Areveltsi and the Problem of His National Identity in Armenology". Etchmiadzin. pp. 487–515.
- Kostanyants, K. (1896). Hamam Areveltsi. Vagharshapat.
- Hovhannes Draskhanakerttsi (1996). History of Armenia. Yerevan.
- Movses Kaghankatvatsi (1969). History of the Country of Aghvank. Yerevan.
- Minorsky, V. (1953). Caucasica IV. Cambridge University Press.
- Stepanos Taronetsi Asoghik (2000). Universal History. Yerevan.
- Vasiliev, A. A. (1902). Byzantium and the Arabs. Vol. II. St. Petersburg.
- Whittow, Mark (1996). The Making of Byzantium, 600-1025. University of California Press.
- Shnirelman, V. A. (2003). Wars of Memory: Myths, Identity and Politics in Transcaucasia. Moscow: Akademkniga.
- Thomson, R. W. (2005). Hamam, Commentary on the Book of Proverbs. Leuven: Peeters.
- Adonts, N. (2006). The Glory of the Bagratids. Yerevan.
- Rayfield, Donald (2013). Edge of Empires: A History of Georgia. Reaktion Books.
- Studia Patristica (2006).
- Encyclopedia of the Middle Ages (2000).
- Journal of the American Oriental Society (2003).

Preceded by Artnerseh	Ruler of Hereti; 865–897	Succeeded by Adarnase the Patrikios
