= Khevi (territorial unit) =

Khevi (Georgian: ხევი; lit. "gorge") was historical-geographical and administrative-territorial unit in eastern Georgian mountains. It was based on ancient primitive-communal territorial units known as "Gora" (Georgian: გორა; lit. "hill"), which would later evolve into Khevi during the Middle Ages. Khevi comprised several mountainous communities along gorges, such highlander communities enjoyed a degree of autonomy or semi-independence within Georgian political entities, corresponding to the period of the so-called “military democracy” or “chiefdom”. They strongly opposed feudal system and were rather electing their own "council of elders" and leaders, known as Khevisberi (elder of the gorge) who would function as a judge, priest and military leader.

== Sources ==
- Niko Berdzenishvili, "Issues of Georgian History", XI, Tbilisi 1964.
