= Aranshahik =

Aranshahik was the first ruling dynasty of Caucasian Albania from an unknown date until the late sixth century AD. According to Movses Khorenatsi, the dynasty of Aranshahik was established by the Armenian king Vagharshak.

== List of rulers ==
1. Prince Arran
2. Prince Aray
3. Prince Anushavan
4. Prince Parat
5. Prince Arbag
6. Prince Zavan
7. Prince Parnas
8. Prince Sur
9. Prince Havang
10. Prince Vashtagh
11. Prince Ambakh
12. Prince Arnakh
13. Prince Shavarsh
14. Prince Horay
15. Prince Vastamkar
16. Prince Harakh
17. Prince Hiran
18. Prince Anjakh
19. Prince Dalagh
20. Prince Horai II
21. Prince Zarmehr
22. Prince Borj
23. Prince Arbun
24. Prince Bazak
25. Prince Khoy
26. Prince Yusak
27. Prince Khaynakh
28. Prince Skaiordu
29. Prince Parui
30. Prince Pharnavaz
31. Prince Pajuj
32. Prince Kornak
33. Prince Pavus
34. Prince Eruand
35. Prince Tigran

== Cadet branches ==
Almost no information exists about Prince Arran and his early successors. According to tradition, in the beginning of the 7th century the Mihranids had invited 60 men of the Aranshahiks to a banquet and had killed them all, with the exception of Zarmihr Aranshahik, who had married a Mihranid princess. Hence the Mihranid family had becomen princes of Gardman and presiding princes of all Caucasian Albania. Sahl Smbatean was a descendant of Zarmihr Aranshahik. According to Arakel Babakhanian Esayi Abu-Muse was a member of the local house of Aranshahik too.

== See also ==
- Kingdom of Artsakh
- Hasan-Jalalyan
- Mihranids
