= Abi'l-Saj =

Abi'l-Saj may refer to:

- Abi'l-Saj Devdad (died 879), Abbasid military commander
- Muhammad Ibn Abi'l-Saj (died 901), first Sajid amir of Azerbaijan
- Yusuf Ibn Abi'l-Saj (died 928), Sajid amir of Azerbaijan
