= Siege of Queli =

Siege of Tbilisi
- Part of Sajid invasion of Georgia
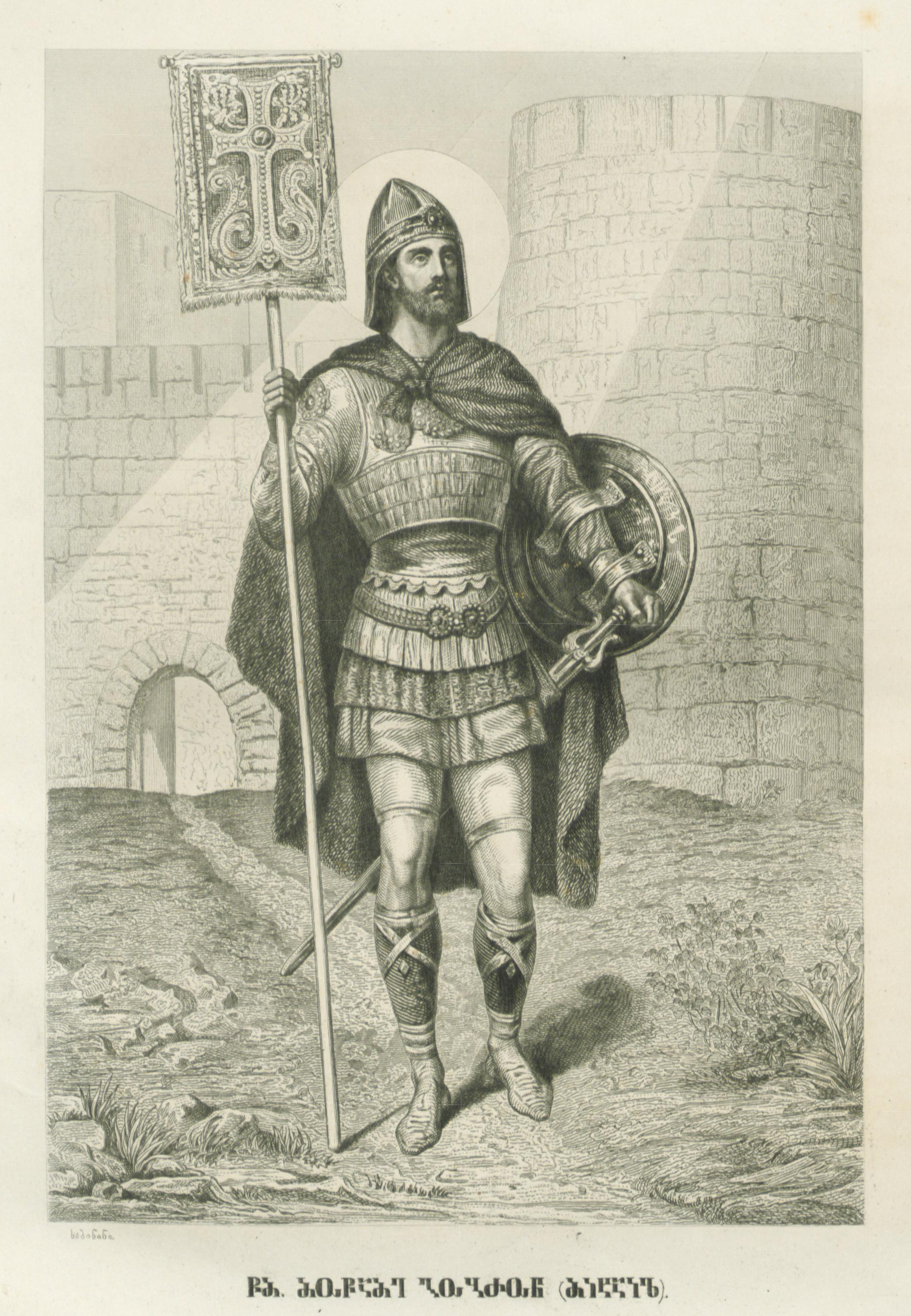
- A painting of St. Mikel-Gobron by Mikhail Sabinin.
Date	September 20 – October 17, 914
Location	Queli, present-day Turkey
Result	Sajid victory (Note: The Muslim force was composed mainly of Persian, Arabic, Azerbaijani and possibly North Caucasian soldiers.)
Territorial changes	The Sajids briefly gain Samtskhe only to lose it in the same year to the Georgians.

Belligerents
Kingdom of the Iberians	Sajid dynasty

Commanders and leaders
Gobron (executed)	Yusuf ibn Abi'l-Saj

Strength
200	20,000

Casualties and losses
133	Heavy

The siege of Queli (Georgian: ყველისციხის ალყა) was the last major military engagement during the Sajid invasion of Georgia in 914. The 28-day-long siege resulted in pyrrhic Muslim victory and execution of the Georgian commander Gobron. Despite the important victory, the invaders were unable to maintain a strong foothold in western Georgia and were forced to withdraw.

== Background ==
The most detailed information about the event is described by a contemporary Georgian hagiographer Stephen of Tbeti in his best-known work Passion of Gobron. Before beginning their destructive campaign in Georgian kingdoms and principalities, the Sajids overran Caucasian Albania and Armenia, executing king Smbat I. After pillaging 87 settlements in eastern Georgia and capturing Ujarma and Bochorma fortresses in Kakheti, the Sajid ruler of Azerbaijan, known as Abu l'Kasim in Georgia and Yusuf ibn Abi'l-Saj elsewhere, launched his massive army to Uplistsikhe, only to find the fortifications demolished by their defenders in order to prevent him from gaining a foothold in the vicinity. From there, the amir surged into Samtskhe and Javakheti. Unable to seize control of the stronghold of Tmogvi, he besieged the castle of Q'ueli (Q'uelis-Tsikhe), which was a fief of a prominent Georgian feudal, Gurgen II of Tao.

== Siege ==
The defense of the fortress was headed by Gobron, a military commander on Gurgen's court. The size of the Muslim army, which included siege engines, was so colossal that the camps set up by its soldiers would cover the expanses of five villages:

And they came to the castle of Qveli, belonging to Gurgen the Archduke, in which the leading lords among them Gobron the blessed martyr for Christ. They came and set up their tents like snow, over an expanse broad enough to contain five villages. And they put up ropes to link their tents, since this was the way in which they attacked, that loathsome race of godless, cruel bowmen, who would eat dogs, mice, human flesh, and all sorts of unclean things. And they also prepared for battle with many catapults, and the number of arrows they shot blocked out the sun from the air, for they had a hundred camel loads of arrows and as many spears.

The Georgians, despite being vastly outnumbered, sporadically launched sorties, inflicting heavy casualties on the opposing force. On the other hand, the Muslims constantly bombarded the castle walls and fortifications with catapults and trebuchets, gradually bringing the castle walls down. At the twenty-eighth day of the siege, the walls came down and the fortress was overrun, putting the most of its defenders in captivity.

== Aftermath ==
Despite the large ransom sent by Gurgen, Yusuf refused to release his prisoners and decided to hold onto Mikel-Gobron as well as 133 others. Gobron, despite Yusuf's multiple attempts, firmly rejected to convert to Islam. According to The Passion of the Holy Martyr Gobron, the Georgian commander who was stubbornly refusing Yusuf's proposal, was ordered to bow down for execution. After the first strike of the sword, Gobron made the sign of the cross with blood on his forehead and exclaimed, "I thank you, Lord Jesus Christ, that you have accounted me, the most contemptible and chief among sinners, worthy to lay down my life for your sake!". The enraged Muslim general ordered the rest of the men to be massacred and their bodies left to the wild beasts. Despite securing the hard-earned castle of Q'ueli, the Sajids were forced to evacuate Tao-Klarjeti due to increasing Georgian power in the west. The general partisan warfare strategy carried out by the Georgians inflicted heavy casualties to the invaders during their campaign in western Georgia.
