= Queli =

Medieval Georgian fortress in Turkey

Q'ueli fortress/Kol (Kuvel) Kalesi
- Near Kolköy, Posof, Ardahan Province, Turkey

Location
- Coordinates: 41.44197°N 42.62386°E

Q'ueli (Georgian: ყუელი) or Q'uelis-tsikhe (ყუელისციხე, "fortress of Q'ueli") was a medieval Georgian fortress atop the homonymous mountain of the Arsiani Range (Yalnızçam Dağları), now within the boundaries of Turkey, where it is known as Kol Kalesi or Kuvel Kalesi. Its Georgian name is alternatively transliterated as Qveli, Kveli, K'veli, Qvelis-ts'ikhe or Qvelis-c'ixe. First appearing in the early 10th-century Georgian sources, Q'ueli was one of the principal fortifications of the province of Samtskhe until being conquered by the Ottoman Empire in the 16th century.

The name Q'ueli/Q'uelis-tsikhe literally translates from Georgian as "a cheese fortress", which was a source of the Greek equivalent Tyrokastron (Τυρόχαστρον)—the name by which the fortress is mentioned in Constantine VII Porphyrogennetos's De Administrando Imperio.

== History ==
The fortress of Q'ueli, now largely in ruins, lies at the village of Kolköy in the present-day district of Posof, northeastern Turkey, close to the border with Georgia. It is first mentioned in the early 10th-century Georgian hagiographic text Passion of Gobron by Stepane Mtbevari as the site of resistance to the invading army of the Azerbaijani emir Yusuf Ibn Abi'l-Saj—Abu l'K'asim of the Georgian accounts—in 914. According to this source, Q'ueli fell after a 28-day siege and the Georgian commanding officer Gobron, a devoted Christian, was put to death for having refused to convert to Islam.

By the 920s, Q'ueli had emerged as a chief fortress of Javakheti, a Georgian duchy which is mentioned in Constantine Porphyrogennetos's De Ceremoniis as Kouel (Κουελ), so named after the fortress itself. In this passage, Constantine refers to the "archon of Kouel", which, according to Professor Cyril Toumanoff, might have been the Georgian Bagratid prince David. Q'ueli is elsewhere referred to by Constantine by its Greek equivalent of Tyrokastron and later appears in possession of David's expansionist cousin, Gurgen II of Tao. Gurgen then gave Q'ueli and Adjara to his father-in-law Ashot Kiskasi in exchange of Klarjeti and, subsequently, deprived him even of these. After Gurgen's death in 941, Q'ueli passed to his cousins and, eventually, was inherited, along with other Bagratid holdings, by Bagrat III, who went on to become the first king of a unified Georgia in 1008.

Due to its strategic location, Q'ueli was a scene of several military conflicts throughout its history. In the 1040s, Q'ueli fell under control of the rebellious Georgian warlord Liparit, who was eventually dispossessed of it by King Bagrat IV of Georgia in 1059. The fortress was then apparently given in possession to Murvan Jaq'eli, who appears as the eristavi (duke) of Q'ueli in the 1060s. In 1065 it was passed by the Seljuqid sultan Alp-Arslan during his Georgian campaigns. In 1080, the Turks led by amir Ahmad, probably of the Mamlān dynasty, surprised and defeated King George II of Georgia at Q'ueli. In the 16th century, Q'ueli, along with much of southwest Georgia, fell under the Ottoman sway and lost its past importance.
