= Gobron =

Saint Gobron
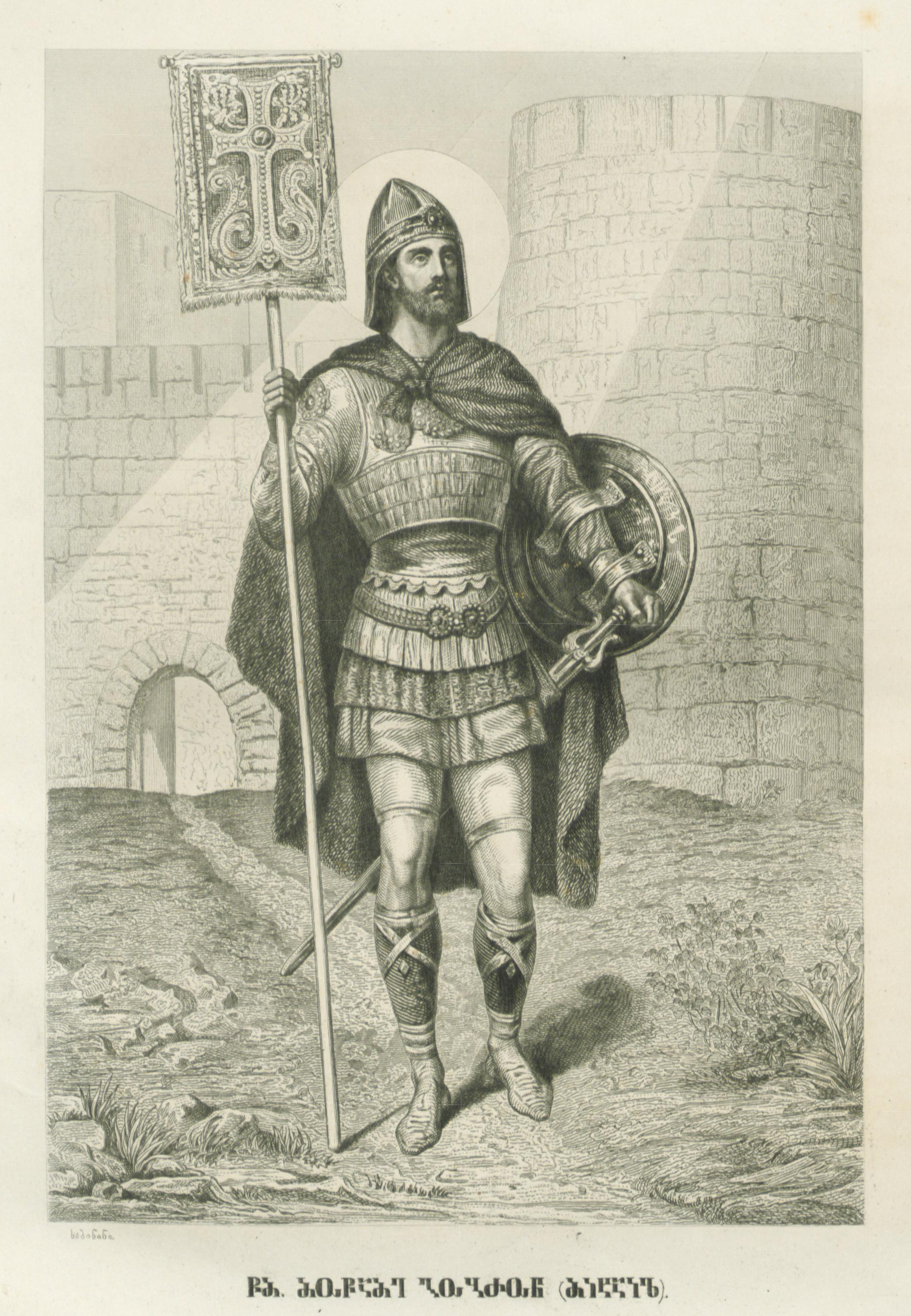
- Saint Michael-Gobron in military attire

Martyr
- Died: 17 November 914
- Venerated in: Eastern Orthodox Church
- Feast: 17 November

Gobron (Georgian: გობრონი, romanized: gobroni), also known as Mikel-Gobron or Michael-Gobron (მიქელ-გობრონი; died 17 November 914), was a Georgian Christian military commander who led the defense of the fortress of Q'ueli against the forces of the Sajid emir of Azerbaijan. After the fortress fell following a 28-day siege, Gobron was captured and beheaded after refusing repeated demands to convert to Islam. Shortly after his death, he became the subject of a hagiographical work authored by Bishop Stephen of T'beti and was later canonized as a saint of the Georgian Orthodox Church, which commemorates him on 17 November (O.S., corresponding to 30 November in the Gregorian calendar). His martyrdom is also mentioned in medieval Georgian and Armenian chronicles.

== Biography ==
Gobron is the subject of The Passion of the Holy Martyr Gobron, Who Was Taken from the Fortress of Q'ueli (წამებაჲ წმიდისა მოწამისა გობრონისი, რომელი განიყვანეს ყუელის ციხით), composed by Bishop Stephen of T'beti (Stepane Mtbevari) at the behest of the Georgian Bagratid prince Ashot I of Tao between 914 and 918. The narrative is set against the backdrop of the military expedition launched in 914 by Yusuf Ibn Abi'l-Saj, the Sajid emir of Azerbaijan. The campaign was among the last major efforts of the Abbasid Caliphate to maintain its waning authority over the Georgian lands, which were then divided among rival Georgian polities and Muslim-controlled territories.

According to medieval Georgian sources, Yusuf ibn Abi'l-Saj invaded Georgia from Armenia, passing through the Muslim Emirate of Tiflis into Kakheti. He then advanced through Kartli into Samtskhe and Javakheti. After failing to capture the fortress of Tmogvi, he laid siege to Q'ueli, which was held by the Georgian Bagratid prince Gurgen of Tao. Q'ueli resisted for 28 days under the command of Gobron, whose original name, according to his Passion, was Mikel (Michael). He organized a determined defense and launched repeated sorties against the besiegers, but was ultimately forced to surrender. Although Gurgen sent a substantial ransom, Yusuf refused to release Gobron and 133 other captives.

According to both historical and hagiographical accounts, Gobron steadfastly rejected the emir's repeated attempts to persuade him to convert to Islam. The Passion of the Holy Martyr Gobron relates that, after once again refusing Yusuf's offer, Gobron was ordered to bow for execution. When struck by the first blow of the sword, he traced the sign of the cross on his forehead with his own blood and proclaimed: "I thank you, Lord Jesus Christ, that you have accounted me, the most contemptible and chief among sinners, worthy to lay down my life for your sake!" Enraged, the emir ordered the remaining Georgian captives to be put to death and their bodies left unburied.

A parallel account preserved in Georgian hagiographical tradition states that, impressed by Gobron's courage, Abu al-Qasim initially ordered that he be treated with respect. King Adarnase sent a substantial ransom, and some captives were released, but Gobron, anticipating his fate, prepared himself for martyrdom. The emir offered him worldly honors and wealth in exchange for apostasy, but Gobron refused. In response, Abu al-Qasim ordered that the Christian captives be executed before his eyes. Despite witnessing their deaths, Gobron remained steadfast. After twice compelling him to bow his head beneath the sword, the emir again demanded that he renounce Christianity, but Gobron declared: "I am a Christian and will never retreat from the name of my Christ!" Abu al-Qasim then ordered his execution. The bodies of Gobron and the 133 martyrs were buried in three large pits, and Christians were forbidden to approach the site. According to tradition, however, the graves shone at night with a divine light visible to both Christians and non-Christians alike.

Gobron's defense of Q'ueli, his capture, and his martyrdom are briefly mentioned in the anonymous 11th-century Chronicle of Kartli, part of the Georgian Chronicles, which refers readers to the more detailed account by Stephen of T'beti. The execution of Mik'ayel of Gogarene is also mentioned by the 10th-century Armenian historian John of Draskhanakert and later by Stephen of Taron.

Michael-Gobron and the 133 martyrs were subsequently recognized as saints by the Georgian Orthodox Church, which commemorates them on 17 November, the date traditionally associated with their martyrdom.
