= Abu'l-Musafir al-Fath =

10th–century Ruler of Azerbaijan (928–929)

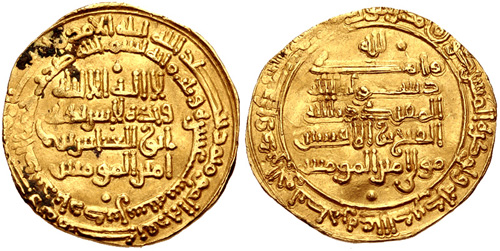
- Gold dinar of Abu'l-Musafir al-Fath, struck at the Ardabil mint, dated 928–929

Emir of Azerbaijan
- In office 928–929
- Preceded by: Yusuf Ibn Abi'l-Saj
- Succeeded by: Wasif al-Shirvani

Personal details
- Parent: Muhammad al-Afshin

Abu'l-Musafir al-Fath (died 929) was the last Sajid amir of Azerbaijan (928–929). He was the son of Muhammad al-Afshin.

In 928 Abu'l-Musafir was invested with the government of Azerbaijan by the caliph after Abu'l-Musafir's uncle Yusuf Ibn Abi'l-Saj was killed. After only one and a half years of rule, however, he was poisoned in Ardabil by one of his slaves. The Sajid dynasty came to an end with his death; he was succeeded as governor by Wasif al-Shirvani.

Preceded by Yusuf Ibn Abi'l-Saj	Emir of Azerbaijan; 928–929	Succeeded by Wasif al-Shirvani
