= Sajid invasion of Georgia =

Sajid invasion of Georgia was the final attempt to establish Muslim hegemony in the South Caucasus before the Seljuk invasions. Yusuf Ibn Abi'l-Saj, a Sajid emir, whom Georgians knew as Abul-Kasim, invaded Georgian lands in 914, with the purpose to strengthen gradually weakening Arab power and Muslim hold on Georgian principalities. He first reached Tbilisi, then turned towards Kakheti and besieged the fortresses of Ujarma and Botchorma. Later, he made peace with Kvirike, chorepiscopus (ruler) of Kakheti and returned control of Ujarma to him. After this, he marched his forces to Kartli and laid waste to it. Georgians themselves destroyed the fortifications of Uplistsikhe, so it wouldn't fall to the hands of the enemy. The Muslim forces then raided Meskheti as well, but were unable to take the Tmogvi fortress and retreated. On the way they besieged Q'ueli fortress and took it despite stiff resistance. Muslims captured the military commander of the castle, Gobron, and put him to death. He was later canonized by Georgian Orthodox Church. Despite his military successes Abu l'Kasim was unable to attain his goal. He was forced to finally retreat from Georgian lands because of stubborn resistance by people whose lands he was so eager to ravage and subject.

The Georgian chronicle also mentions another expedition between 918 and 923 of the "Saracens called Saj", in the course of which Mtskheta was taken and the Monastery of the Holy Cross burned down. The Muslim sources are silent about these events.

== See also ==
- Arab rule in Georgia
