= Devdad ibn Muhammad =

- Emir of the Sajid dynasty
- Rule: 901 (five months)
- Predecessor: Muhammad ibn Abi'l-Saj
- Successor: Yusuf ibn Abi'l-Saj
- House: Sajid
- Religion: Sunni Islam

Devdad ibn Muhammad was the Sajid amir of Azerbaijan for a period in 901. He was the son of Muhammad al-Afshin.

Devdad was installed as emir by the army following his father's death in 901. After a reign of five months, he was removed from power by his uncle Yusuf ibn Abi'l-Saj and the walls of Maragha were razed.

Preceded by Muhammad ibn Abi'l-Saj	Emir of Azerbaijan; 901	Succeeded by Yusuf ibn Abi'l-Saj
