= Yalnızçam Mountains =

Mountain range in Turkey and Georgia

- Arsiani Range
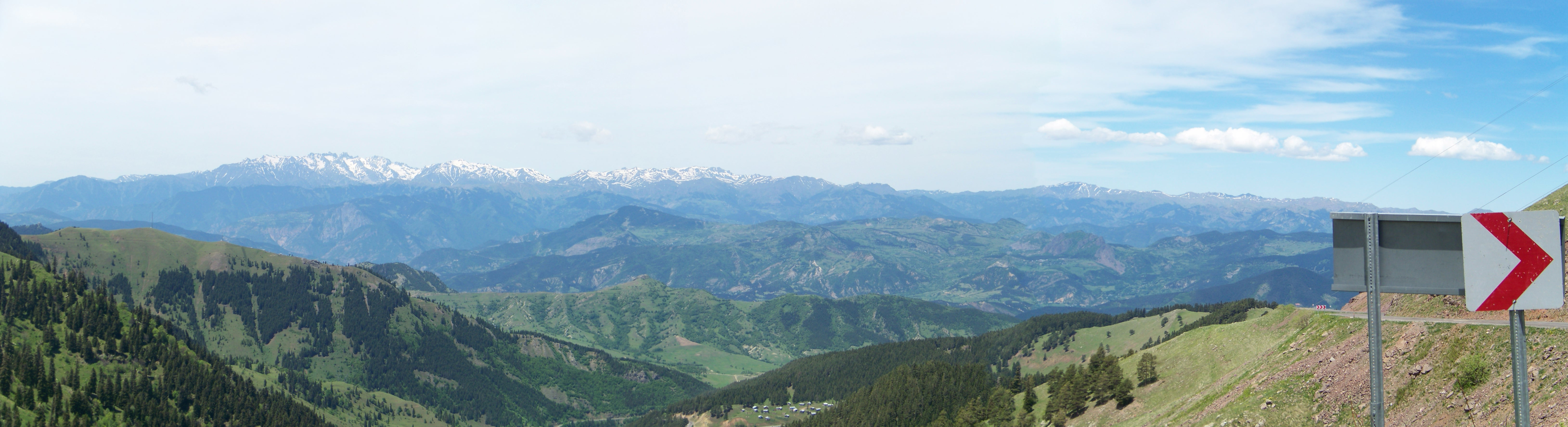
- Arsiani Range

Highest point
- Peak: Shkhapizga
- Elevation: 3,026 m (9,928 ft)

Dimensions
- Length: 60 km (37 mi)

Geography
- Location within Turkey Location within Georgia
- Countries: Turkey, Georgia
- Range coordinates: 41°23′29″N 42°31′12″E
- Parent range: Caucasus

The Arsiani Range (Turkish: Yalnızçam Dağları) or (Georgian: არსიანის ქედი, arsianis kedi) is a mountain range in Eastern Anatolia Region, northeast Turkey, and the Autonomous Republic of Adjara, southwest Georgia. The range, continuing the Lesser Caucasus to the Armenian Highlands, forms the watershed between the river valleys of Çoruh/Chorokhi and Kura/Mtkvari. The highest peak is that of "Yalnızçam" or "Arsiani" (3,165 m).

== See also ==
- Q'ueli
