= Stephen of Tbeti =

Stepane Mtbevari (Georgian: სტეფანე მტბევარი) was a 10th-century hierarch of the Georgian Orthodox Church, religious writer and calligrapher. Mtbevari, "of T'beti", is the title indicating his holding of the diocese of T'beti, centered on the eponymous monastery in Shavsheti (now in eastern Turkey). He is praised by the contemporary hagiographer Giorgi Merchule as a writer in The Life of Grigol of Khandzta, but beyond a translation of a commentary to the Psalms, the Passion of Gobron is his only—and best known—extant work.

The Passion of Gobron is a piece of original hagiography, commissioned from the author by the Georgian Bagratid prince Ashot Kukhi (died 918) and relating heroic defense of the fort of Q'ueli by Christian Georgian noble Gobron and his eventual death as a martyr at the hands of the Muslim emir Yusuf Ibn Abi'l-Saj (Abu l'Kasim) in 914. "The Holy Father Stepane Mtbevari" and his work are also mentioned by the 11th-century anonymous Chronicle of Kartli, part of the Georgian Chronicles, while the 11th-century historian Sumbat reports Stepane's installment by Ashot Kukhi as the first bishop of T'beti.

The Passion of Gobron opens with edifying quotations from the Book of Job and Saint Paul. It then continues, condemning the Armenians for their "heresy", a reference to Armenia's rejection of the Council of Chalcedon. While describing the Muslim invasion and Gobron's defense of Q'ueli, Stepane shows a talent for epic storytelling.
