= Subuk =

Emir of Azerbaijan from 919 to 922

Subuk (died 922?) was a ghulam who gained the governorship of Azerbaijan in 919 and held it for three years.

In 919, Subuk's master, the Sajid Yusuf Ibn Abu'l-Saj, was captured by forces of the caliph, with whom he had been at war. Acting in order to protect Yusuf's interests, Subuk took control of Azerbaijan. After defeating a caliphal army, he was recognized as governor of the province by al-Muqtadir. For the next three years, he awaited the return of Yusuf. The latter was freed from prison and returned to Azerbaijan in 922; Subuk had died by that time.

Preceded by Yusuf Ibn Abu'l-Saj	Emir of Azerbaijan; 919–922	Succeeded by Yusuf Ibn Abu'l-Saj
