= Muhammad ibn Abi'l-Saj =

Sajid dynasty founder and governor of Azerbaijan from 889 to 901

Afshin Muhammad ibn Abi'l-Saj

Governor of Azerbaijan
- In office 889 – 898
- Monarchs: al-Mu'tamid, al-Mu'tadid
- In office 898 –901
- Monarch: al-Mu'tadid
- Succeeded by: Devdad ibn Muhammad

Governor of Anbar
- In office 880 – 880s
- Monarch: al-Mu'tamid

Personal details
- Born: Unknown date Iran
- Died: 901 Bardaa
- Children: Devdad (son)
- Parent: Abi'l-Saj Devdad (father)
- Known for: Founder of the Sajid dynasty
- Military career
- Allegiance: Abbasid Caliphate
- Branch: Abbasid army
- Rank: General
- Conflicts: Mu'tadid's campaigns in Armenia and Azerbaijan

Muhammad ibn Abi'l-Saj (Arabic: محمد بن أبي الساج) also known as Muhammad al-Afshin (died 901), an Iranian appointed general of al-Mu'tadid, He was the founder of Sajid dynasty and governor of Azerbaijan, from 889 or 890 until his death. He was the son of Abi'l-Saj Devdad.

== Early career ==
Like their father, Muhammad and his brother Yusuf had long and active careers. In 879 Muhammad was appointed by the Saffarid Amr ibn al-Layth as his representative in Mecca, and was later appointed by the Abbasids as the governor of Anbar and Rahba.

When the amir of Egypt Ahmad ibn Tulun died in 884, Muhammad was presented an opportunity to capture some of his territories in Syria from his inexperienced son and heir, Khumarawayh. He allied himself with another Abbasid general, Ishaq ibn Kundaj, who had received authorization and some troops from al-Muwaffaq. Ishaq clashed with the Tulunid governor of Raqqa in April 884, and soon after, the Tulunid governor of Damascus defected, bringing with him Antioch, Aleppo and Hims. Khumarawayh responded by sending troops to Syria, who soon succeeded in recovering the lost cities, before both sides settled into winter quarters. In the spring, al-Muwaffaq's son, Abu'l-Abbas Ahmad (the future Caliph al-Mu'tadid), arrived to take control. Ahmad and Ishaq defeated the Tulunids, who were driven back to Palestine, but Ahmad quarrelled with Ishaq and Muhammad, who departed with their troops, and at the Battle of the Mills on 6 April Khumarawayh's general Sa'd al-Aysar routed the Abbasid army. This signalled the end of the alliance between Muhammad and Ishaq: Muhammad now turned to Khumarawayh, and persuaded him to invade the Jazira. With Egyptian aid, Muhammad crossed the Euphrates, defeated Ishaq's forces in a number of battles in 886–887, and forced him to recognize Tulunid control. The entire Jazira now became a Tulunid province, a fact recognized by the Abbasid government in a treaty in December 886 that confirmed Khumarawayh in his old and new possessions.

Ishaq remained as governor of Mosul under Tulunid authority. In 887/8 he tried to rebel but was defeated. Although he re-acknowledged Tulunid suzerainty, he was now stripped of Mosul in favor of Muhammad. Ishaq now concentrated his attentions on defeating Muhammad, and soon managed to secure the favor and support of Khumarawayh: in 888–889 Ishaq defeated Muhammad at Damascus, who then fled to al-Muwaffaq.

In 889 or 890 Caliph al-Mu'tamid's brother and regent, al-Muwaffaq, appointed Muhammad as governor of Azerbaijan. His first challenge came in the form of 'Abd-Allah ibn al-Hasan ibn al-Hamdani, a rebel who had taken control of Maragha. Muhammad convinced him to surrender in 893 by promising his safety, but once 'Abd-Allah did so he was executed by the Sajid. Maragha was afterwards made Muhammad's capital, though he usually resided in Bardaa.

== Conflict over Armenia ==
When the Bagratid Smbat I came to the throne of Armenia in 890, Muhammad had sent him a crown and presents in the name of the caliph, asserting his own authority over Smbat in the process. When Smbat sent envoys to the Byzantine emperor in 892, Muhammad threatened to attack him, but Smbat managed to convince the Sajid not to carry out his threat through diplomatic means. Three years later, however, the Bagratid invaded Georgia and Albania. In response Muhammad seized Nakhchivan and Dvin, but was then defeated and decided to make peace.

At some point in his career Muhammad decided to assert his independence from the caliph, probably by refusing to send the revenue due to Baghdad. In 898 he assumed the title al-Afshin, the title previously used by the rulers of Ushrusana in Transoxiana (Muhammad's family was originally from that province). Soon afterwards he decided to restore his loyalty to the caliph, and was confirmed as governor of Azerbaijan and Armenia.

Muhammad launched another campaign against Smbat, taking Kars and capturing Smbat's wife and part of his treasury. Dvin was furthermore brought under control. In 899 Muhammad exchanged Smbat's wife for his son Ashot. Shortly after this he forced the Artsrunid ruler of Vaspurakan, Ashot-Sargis Artsruni, to submit to his authority. In the meantime his loyalty to the caliph again became uncertain. In 900 he invaded Vaspurakan again after Ashot-Sargis's brother, whom Muhammad had taken as a hostage the last time he had invaded, escaped. He left a garrison in Vaspurakan after Ashot-Sargis fled and returned to Bardaa. While preparing another campaign against Smbat, he died of an epidemic in 901. He was succeeded by his son Devdad.

== Notes ==
Unknown	Afshin of Azerbaijan; 889–901	Succeeded by Devdad ibn Muhammad
