= Abu'l-Saj Devdad =

Sogdian prince and Abbasid commander and official (died 879)

Abu'l-Saj Devdad أبو الساج ديوداد

Abbasid Governor of Ahvaz
- In office 875–876
- Monarch: al-Mu'tamid
- Succeeded by: Ibrahim ibn Sima

Personal details
- Born: Abbasid Caliphate
- Died: 879
- Children: Muhammad, Yusuf
- Parent: Devdad
- Relatives: Abd al-Rahman ibn Muflih (son in-law)
- Military career
- Allegiance: Abbasid Caliphate
- Branch: Abbasid Army
- Rank: Commander
- Conflicts: Fifth Fitna

Abu'l-Sāj Dēvdād (Arabic: أبو الساج ديوداد, Abū al-Sāj Dīwdād; died 879) was a Sogdian prince, who was of the most prominent emirs, commanders and officials of the Abbasid Caliphate. He was the eponymous ancestor of the Sajid dynasty of Azerbaijan. His father was named Devdasht.

== Biography ==
Abu'l-Saj belonged to Sogdian family from Jankakath and Suydak, which were two villages that were very close to each other, and were the dependencies of Ushrusana. He entered into the service of the Abbasids and fought under the Afshin during the latter's final campaign against the rebel Babak Khorramdin in 837 AD. He also fought against the Karenid rebel Mazyar in 839, and one year later against Mankjur al-Farghani, the lieutenant and cousin of Afshin. Over the next several decades he served the caliphs in various provinces. In 865 he sided with the caliph al-Musta'in during the civil war of that year, and was put in charge of the defense of al-Mada'in.

In 875, Abu'l-Saj was appointed as the governor of Ahvaz by the caliph and was given a task to assignment to suppress the rebellion of 'Ali ibn Muhammad, who had assembled and encouraged a group of Zanji slaves to rebel. Abu'l-Saj, while he was on his way to Ahvaz, sent his son-in-law, 'Abd al-Rahman ibn Muflih, to Fars in order to subdue the military adventurer Muhammad ibn Wasil. However, when Abu'l-Saj was in Dulab (a village near Ahvaz), news reached to him about the defeat and death of 'Abd al-Rahman, which made him go to 'Askar Mukram instead. The Zanjis used this as an opportunity to attack Ahvaz, where they subjected the city into pillaging and killing. This made the caliph dismiss Abu'l-Saj from his post by appointing Ibrahim ibn Sima instead.

The following year, Abu'l-Saj joined the Saffarid amir Ya'qub bin Layth, who had led his army into Khuzistan during his advance into Iraq against the caliph. He was present during the Battle of Dayr al-'Aqul, which ended in a Saffarid defeat, and reportedly remonstrated Ya'qub after the battle for his bad tactics. Following the defeat, the caliphal regent al-Muwaffaq seized his properties in Iraq. In 879, Ya'qub died after of colic disease, and was succeeded by his younger brother Amr ibn al-Layth, who made peace with the Abbasid Caliphate.

After having made peace with the caliph, Abu'l-Saj left Fars for Baghdad, but died at Gundeshapur in November–December before he managed to reach Baghdad. His two sons, Muhammad and Yusuf, would both go on to have distinguished careers, becoming the first and third, respectively, Sajid governors of Azerbaijan.

== Sources ==
- Khatibi, Abolfazl; Poor, Daryoush Mohammad. "Abū al-Sāj". Encyclopedia Islamica. BRILL.
- Bosworth, C.E. The History of the Saffarids of Sistan and the Maliks of Nimruz (247/861 to 949/1542-3). Costa Mesa, California: Mazda Publishers, 1994.
- Madelung, Wilfred. "Banu Saj." Encyclopaedia Iranica. Ed. Ehsan Yarshater. Columbia University. Retrieved 17 August 2011.
- Madelung, W. (1975). "The Minor Dynasties of Northern Iran". In Frye, Richard N. (ed.). The Cambridge History of Iran: From the Arab Invasion to the Saljuqs. Vol. 4. Cambridge: Cambridge University Press. pp. 198–249. ISBN 0-521-20093-8.
