= Sajid dynasty =

889–929 Iranian Muslim dynasty of Azerbaijan and Armenia

Sajid dynasty ساجیان
- 889–929
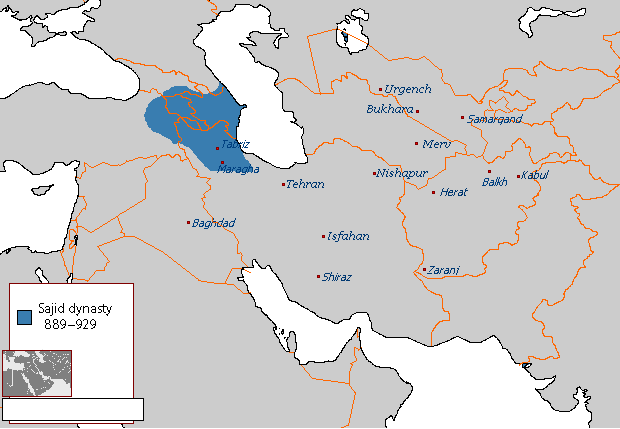
- Map of the Sajid dynasty at its greatest extent
- Capital: Maragha (889–901); Ardabil (901–929)
- Religion: Sunni Islam
- Government: Monarchy
- Afshin
  - 889–901: Muhammad ibn Abi'l-Saj
  - 928–929: Abu'l-Musafir al-Fath (last)
- Historical era: Middle Ages
  - Established: 889
  - Disestablished: 929
Preceded by	Succeeded by
Abbasid Caliphate	Sallarid dynasty

The Sajid dynasty (Persian: ساجیان, romanized: sâjiyân, also known as Banu Saj) was a Muslim dynasty, of Iranian origin, that ruled from 889/890 until 929. The Sajids ruled Azerbaijan and parts of Armenia first from Maragha and Barda and then from Ardabil. (Note: "For nearly forty years, until the killing of Fatḥ b. Moḥammad b. Abi’l-Sāj in 317/929, members of the family ruled Azerbaijan and Armenia first from Marāḡa and Barḏaʿa and then from Ardabīl. They reduced refractory Armenian princes to submission, but themselves sporadically withheld allegiance to Baghdad and suspended the payment of tribute; after the end of the Sajids, direct caliphal control was never restored in northwestern Iran.") The Sajids originated from the Central Asian province of Ushrusana and were of Iranian (Sogdian) descent and culturally Arabised. (Note: "In ca. 279/892 the caliph Moʿtażed appointed one of his generals, Moḥammad b. Abi’l-Sāj, an Iranian from Central Asia, as governor of Azerbaijan and Armenia, and the family of the Sajids") Muhammad ibn Abi'l-Saj Diwdad the son of Diwdad, the first Sajid ruler of Azerbaijan, was appointed as its ruler in 889 or 890. Muhammad's father Abu'l-Saj Devdad had fought under the Ushrusanan prince Afshin Khaydar during the latter's final campaign against the rebel Babak Khorramdin in Azerbaijan, and later served the caliphs. Toward the end of the tenth century, as the central authority of the Abbasid Caliphate weakened, Muhammad was able to form a virtually independent state. Much of the Sajids' energies were spent in attempting to take control of neighboring Armenia. The dynasty ended with the death of Abu'l-Musafir al-Fath in 929.

== History ==
At the end of the ninth century (898–900) coins were minted named after Muhammad ibn Abu Saj. Muhammad ibn Abu Saj succeeded in incorporating much of the South Caucasus into the Sajid state. The first capital of Sajids was Maragha though they usually resided in Barda.

Yusuf ibn Abi’l-Saj came to power in 901 and demolished the walls of Maragha and moved the capital to Ardabil. The eastern borders of the Sajid dynasty extended to the shores of the Caspian Sea, and the western borders to the cities of Ani and Dabil (Dvin). Yusuf ibn Abi’l-Saj relations with the caliph were not good. In 908, a caliphate army was sent against Yusuf, but al-Muqtafi died and his successor, al-Muqtadir, moved a large army against Yusuf ibn Abi’l-Saj and forced him to pay a tribute of 120 thousand dinars a year. Abu'l-Hasan Ali ibn al-Furat the vizier of al-Muqtadir, played a key role in establishing peace, and since then Yusuf ibn Abi’l-Saj considered him his patron in Baghdad and often mentioned him on his coins. Peace allowed Yusuf ibn Abi’l-Saj to receive investiture of the governorship in Azerbaijan by the caliph in 909.

After the dismissal (in 912) of his protector in Baghdad, vizier ibn al-Furat, Yusuf ibn Abi’l-Saj stopped annual tax payments to the caliphate’s treasury.

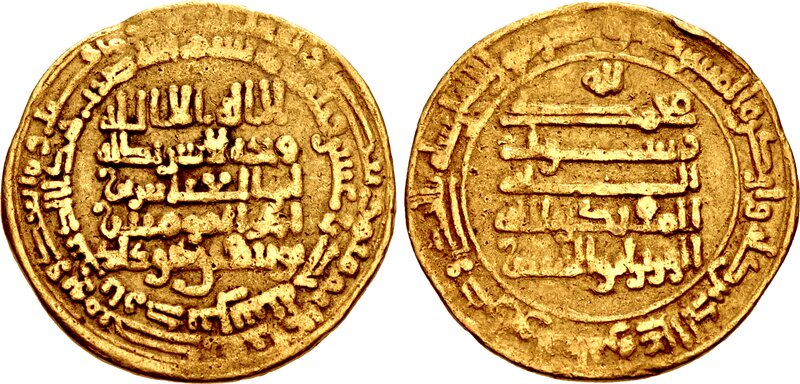
Coinage of Yusuf ibn Abi'l-Saj.

According to the Azerbaijani historian Abbasgulu aga Bakikhanov, from 908–909 to 919, the Sajids made the Shirvanshah Mazyadids dependent on them. Thus, at the beginning of the tenth century, the Sajid state included territories from Zanjan in the south to Derbent in the north, the Caspian Sea in the east, to the cities of Ani and Dabil in the west, covering most of the lands of modern Azerbaijan.

During the reign of Yusuf ibn Abi'l-Saj, Russian raiders attacked the Sajid territory from the north via the Volga in 913–914. Yusuf ibn Abu Saj repaired the Derbent wall to strengthen the northern borders of the state. He also rebuilt the collapsed part of the wall inside the sea.

In 914, Yusuf ibn Abi’l-Saj organized a campaign towards Georgia. Tbilisi was chosen as the center of military operations. He first occupied Kakheti and captured the fortresses of Ujarma and Bochorma, and returned after capturing several territories.

After the death of Yusuf ibn Abu Saj, the last ruler of the Sajid dynasty Fath b. Muhammad b. Abi 'l-Saj was poisoned in Ardabil by one of his slaves, which ended the Sajid dynasty and enabled eventual expansion of the Sallarid dynasty into Azerbaijan in 941.

== Chronology ==
- Abdu Ubaydullah Muhammad Ibn Abi'l-Saj (889–901)
- Abu'l Musafir Devdad Ibn Muhammad (901)
- Yusuf Ibn Abi'l-Saj (901–919)
  - Subuk (919–922) (a servant of the Sajids and a temporary care-taker)
- Yusuf (restored) (922–928)
- Fath b. Muhammad b. Abi 'l-Saj (928–929)

== See also ==
- History of Azerbaijan
- History of Iran
- Sajid invasion of Georgia
- List of Sunni Muslim dynasties
- Iranian Intermezzo
