= Yusuf ibn Abi'l-Saj =

Sajid dynasty Emir of Azerbaijan from 901 to 928

- Emir of the Sajid dynasty
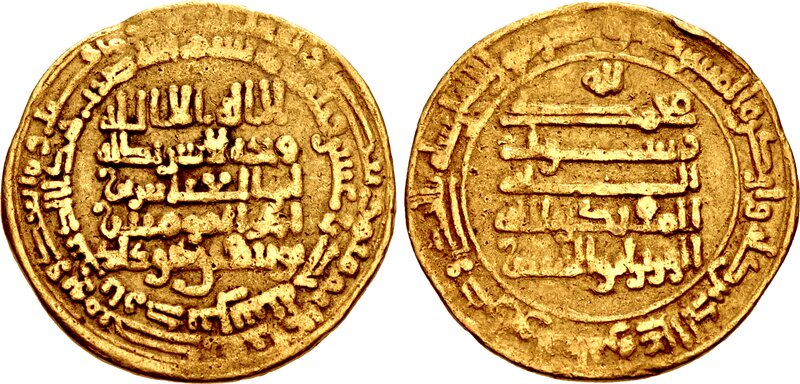
- Coin of Yusuf ibn Abi'l-Saj, citing heir Abu'l-'Abbas, vizier Abu'l-Hassan, and caliph al-Muqtadir. Ardabil mint AH 276 (AD 889/90)

Emir of Azerbaijan
- Reign: 901 – 928
- Predecessor: Devdad ibn Muhammad
- Successor: Abu'l-Musafir al-Fath
- Born: Unknown; Iran
- Died: 928; Kufa
- House: Sajid
- Father: Abi'l-Saj Devdad
- Religion: Sunni Islam

Yusuf ibn Abi'l Saj (d. 928) was the Sajid Emir of Azerbaijan from 901 until his death. He was the son of Abi'l-Saj Devdad.

== War with Armenians and Georgians ==
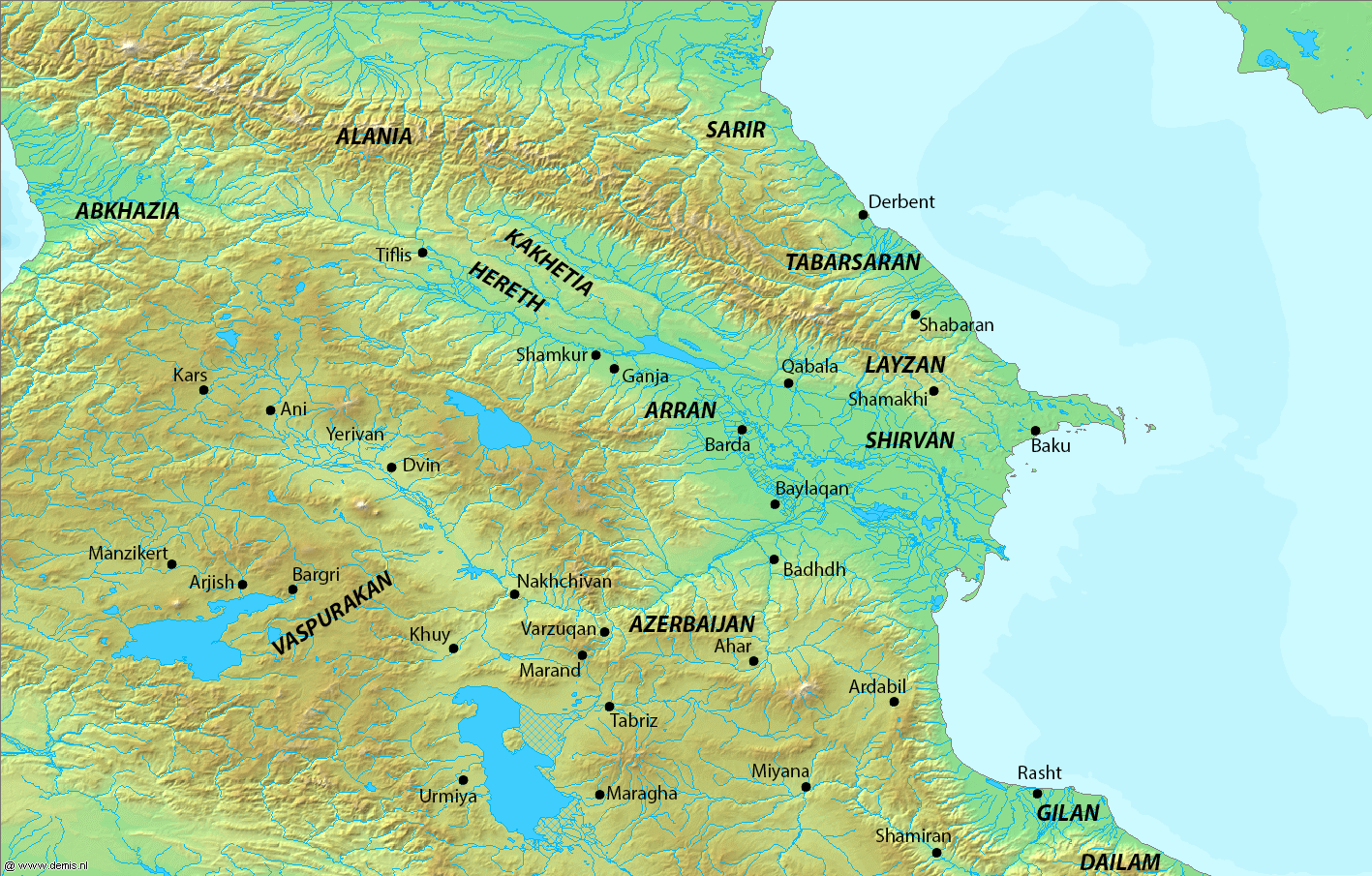
Map of Azerbaijan and Caucasus.

Yusuf came to power in 901 by overthrowing his nephew, Devdad Ibn Muhammad. He razed the walls of Maragha and moved the capital to Ardabil. Shortly afterwards, the Bagratid king of Armenia, Smbat I, offered to become a direct vassal of the caliph al-Muktafi. As this threatened the Sajids' interests in Armenia, Yusuf demanded that Smbat appear before him. When the Bagratid refused he invaded Armenia. An agreement was eventually reached between the two sides in 903; Smbat received a crown from Yusuf, acknowledging him as his overlord.

Yusuf had never formalized his relations with the caliph, and they became hostile toward each other. In 908 a caliphal army was sent against Yusuf, but al-Muktafi died and his successor al-Muqtadir made peace with the Sajid. Al-Muqtadir's vizier Ali ibn al-Furat had been instrumental in the establishment of the peace; from then on Yusuf considered him to be his protector in Baghdad and often named him on his coinage. The peace allowed Yusuf to be invested with the governments of Azerbaijan and Armenia in 909 by the caliph.

During the conflict between the Yusuf and the caliphate, the latter had encouraged King Smbat to oppose the Sajid. After settling his relations with the caliph Yusuf decided to retaliate. He found a willing ally in the prince of Vaspurakan, Gagik Artsruni, who was engaged in a dispute with the Bagratid over the province of Nakhichevan. Gagik became Yusuf's vassal and the Sajid gave him a crown. In 909 Yusuf took Nakhichevan and, together with Gagik, gained control of Siunikh. He then pursued Smbat across the country, and after spending the winter in Dvin defeated in 910 an army under the command of Smbat's two sons, Ashot and Mushel to the north of Erevan. Mushel was captured and poisoned.

The war between the Sajids and the Bagratids continued, during which the country was devastated and the Armenians suffered from religious oppression at the hands of the Muslims. In around 913 Yusuf managed to trap Smbat in one of his fortresses. Although the siege was unable to force the surrender of the fortress, Smbat decided to voluntarily surrender himself to Yusuf in an effort to end the war. Yusuf initially let him go, but then seized him and put him in prison for a year. During the siege of Erenjak, in an effort to convince the defenders to surrender, Yusuf had Smbat tortured and executed before the fortress' walls. The body was then sent to Dvin and hung there. Smbat's son Ashot succeeded him as Ashot II. Yusuf initially tried to defeat him as well; Gagik refused to cooperate so he set up the Sparapet Ashot as rival king in Dvin. Ashot II was able to gain the loyalty of the Armenians, however, and could also count on the support of the Byzantines. Since Yusuf was having his own problems with the caliphate again (see below), he made peace with Ashot in 917, giving him a crown.

In 914, Yusuf Ibn Abi'l-Saj—known to the Georgians as Abu l'Kasim—also campaigned in the Georgian territories. This campaign was one of the last major attempts on the part of the Abbasid Caliphate to retain its crumbling hold of the Georgian lands, which, at that time, were a patchwork of rival, native states and Muslim holdings. Yusuf made Tiflis as the base for his operations. He first invaded Kakheti and took hold of the fortresses of Ujarma and Bochorma, but the former was then given back to the Kakhetian ruler Kvirike following his plea for peace. Yusuf then proceeded to Kartli, only to see the fortifications of Uplistsikhe demolished by their defenders. From there, the amir surged into Samtskhe and Javakheti. Unable to seize control of the stronghold of Tmogvi, he captured the fortress of Q'ueli and put its defender Gobron to death. The Muslim sources are silent about these events.

== Imprisonment, restoration and death ==
After the dismissal of the vizier Ibn al-Furat, Yusuf had begun to withhold some of the annual tribute due to the caliph. In 915 or 916 he imprisoned a caliphal envoy, although he later released him and sent him back with presents and money. After Ibn al-Furat regained the vizierate in 917 he conquered Zanjan, Abhar, Qazvin and Ray from the Samanids and hoped that Ibn al-Furat would smooth things over with al-Muqtadir. The caliph, however, angrily sent an army against Yusuf, who defeated it. The arrival of a second Abbasid army under Mu'nis al-Khadim caused Yusuf to retreat to Ardebil. Although Ibn al-Furat attempted to convince al-Muqtadir to recognize Yusuf as governor, the caliph refused. In 918 the Abbasid army was defeated by Yusuf near Ardabil, but in 919 the Sajid was defeated. Yusuf was captured and brought back to Baghdad where he was imprisoned for three years. During this time, his faithful ghulam Subuk took control of Azerbaijan and maintained the province while his master was in Baghdad, defeating an Abbasid army sent against him.

In 922 Yusuf was released and the caliph invested him with the governorship of Azerbaijan and the provinces that he had conquered from the Samanids. Returning to Azerbaijan, he found that Subuk had died. In 924 he conquered Ray from its governor, who had rebelled against the Samanids. After leaving the area and occupying Hamadan, the people of Ray expelled his officials. In 925 the Sajid briefly returned to Ray.

In 926 Yusuf was instructed by the caliph to take charge of the campaign against the Qarmatians of al-Hasa. In 927, despite having a large numerical advantage, Yusuf's army was defeated by the Qarmatians near Kufa. The Sajid was captured and in 928 killed. In Azerbaijan he was succeeded by his nephew Abu'l-Musafir al-Fath.

== Sources ==
- Madelung, W. (1975). "The Minor Dynasties of Northern Iran". In Frye, R.N. (ed.). The Cambridge History of Iran, Volume 4: From the Arab Invasion to the Saljuqs. Cambridge: Cambridge University Press. pp. 198–249. ISBN 978-0-521-20093-6.

Preceded by Devdad Ibn Muhammad	Emir of Azerbaijan; 901–928	Succeeded by Abu'l-Musafir al-Fath
